= Cheryl Kelley =

American painter

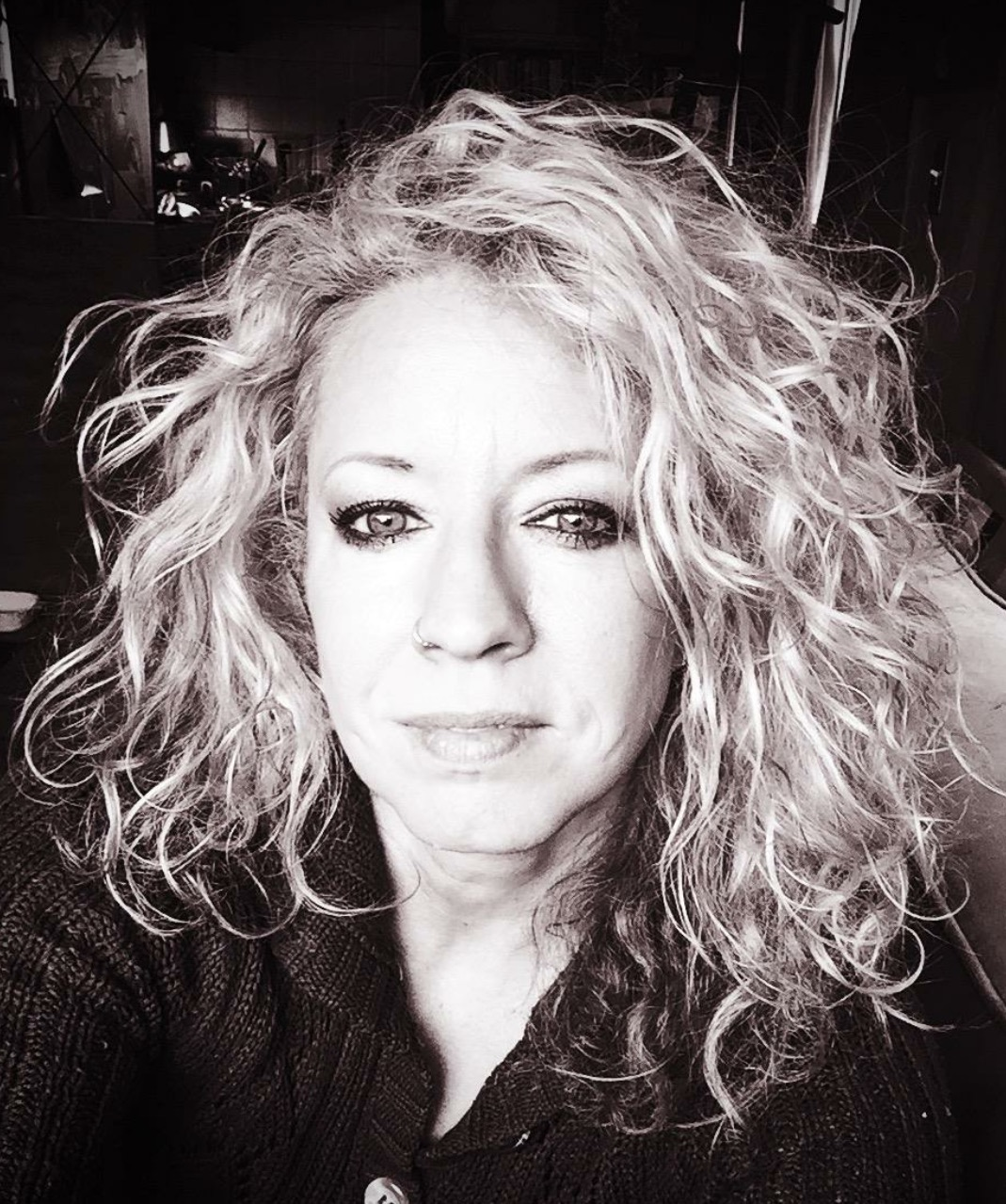
- Cheryl Kelley, photo by the artist
- Born: 1968 (age 57–58); Houston, Texas, USA
- Education: University of Houston (Houston, Texas, USA); High School for the Performing and Visual Arts (Houston, Texas, USA)
- Known for: Photorealistic paintings, especially of cars
- Style: Photorealism, Hyperrealism
- Awards: Pollock-Krasner Foundation Grant; Hunting Art Prize Finalist

Cheryl Kelley is an American painter known for her photorealism, especially her paintings of classic and muscle cars. Her work has been featured on the cover of Harper's Magazine and can be seen at the Scott Richards Contemporary Art gallery in San Francisco, California, the Bernarducci·Meisel Gallery in New York City, New York, and the Seven Bridges Foundation in Greenwich, Connecticut. In 2009 and 2011 she was a finalist for the Hunting Art Prize, and in 2012 she received a Pollock-Krasner Foundation grant. The art collectors' resource Artsy considers her one of ten "Masters of Photorealism".

== Style ==
Kelley began her career as an abstract expressionist but is recognized chiefly as a photorealist or hyperrealist. In 2003, she began to make paintings of cars using oil on canvas, saying she was drawn by the abstract quality of reflections off the cars' curved surfaces. Around 2008, she began to use oil on aluminum panels. Like traditional photorealists, Kelley bases her paintings on photographs, in this case taken mostly at car shows and automobile museums. However, her technique does not rely strictly on the "mechanical" transfer of photographic images to canvas.

== Technique ==
Much of the commentary on Kelley's work centers on her use of cars as subjects. Her low angles of perspective and emphasis on "sensuous curves and luscious surfaces" are seen as representing a feminine, sexualized take on a conventionally masculine area of interest. By "portray[ing] high-powered muscle cars as seductive objects of desire," she "brings a uniquely female perspective to these objects that are almost synonymous with youthful bad-boy hyper-masculinity."

Have you ever seen a car so sexy that you wanted to run your hands all over it, maybe even stretch out luxuriously on the hood? .... Along with pinup and boudoir photography, the dominion of male artists over car art is being left in the dust. While Robert Bechtle paints photorealistic automobiles in their natural, middle-class habitats, Kelley takes them out of context, removing their utilitarian role and elevating them to works of art, freeing her to infuse them with hyperrealistic detail.

Observers state that her works resemble high-definition photographs, but that the images shown in reflection actually make the paintings seem "more realistic than their photographic references."

== Recognition ==
Kelley gained public attention in 2009 as a finalist for the Hunting Art Prize. In August 2009, her work was featured on the cover of Harper's Magazine. Shortly afterward, her work was chosen by Frank Bernarducci, a leading authority on photorealism, for exhibition at the Bernarducci·Meisel Gallery, which he co-founded with Louis K. Meisel. Los Angeles gallery Jonathan Novak Contemporary Art includes her among a group of "revered and influential" photorealists, including John Baeder, Robert Bechtle, Charles Bell, Robert Cottingham, Richard Estes, Gus Heinze, Ralph Goings, Daniel Green, and Elizabeth Patterson. In 2013, Artsy included her on its list of ten "Masters of Photorealism," along with founding photorealists Richard Estes and Robert Cottingham.

Beyond the art world, fans of classic and muscle cars admire Kelley's paintings for capturing the aesthetic experience of viewing classic cars, both as art objects and in the context of auto shows. Automotive writer Aaron Miller dubbed her "the most photo-realistic automotive artist in America," while Rosecrans Baldwin has said she "is the best thing that ever happened to car shows."

Her recent work gets the sex appeal right but also nails the grandeur of auto shows, where some of the world’s fastest objects sit still under lights.

Her technique and her subject matter have inspired numerous tributes from fans impressed by the photorealism of her paintings as well as the apparent incongruity of a "lady who ... paints super awesome cars."

Cheryl Kelley likes to paint hyper-realistic portraits of vintage muscle cars. This Texas based artist uses high-gloss oil paints to recreate Detroit iron with photographic precision. The result is uncanny and cool. Cheryl draws her subject matter inspiration from hanging out at car shows. I ask you, can a girl get any cooler than this?

== Personal life ==
Cheryl Kelley was born in Houston, Texas in 1968. She graduated from the High School for the Performing and Visual Arts in Houston in 1987 and attended the University of Houston. She now lives in Santa Fe, New Mexico.

== Noted exhibitions ==
=== Solo exhibitions ===
2015 Seven Bridges Foundation, Greenwich, CT

2013 "Cheryl Kelley: Detailed," Samek Art Gallery, Bucknell University, Lewisburg, PA

=== Group exhibitions ===
2016 "Land Escapes," Joshua Liner Gallery, New York, NY

2015 "Stainless Steel: A Group Exhibition of Reflective Works in 3 Dimensions," Bernarducci·Meisel Gallery, New York, NY

2015 "The Art of Collecting," Flint Institute of Arts, Flint, MI

2014 "Everybody Needs a Hero!" Scott Richards Contemporary Art, San Francisco, CA

2014 "Winter White," Bernarducci·Meisel Gallery, New York, NY

2014 "Photorealism in a Digital Age II" Bernarducci·Meisel Gallery, New York, NY

2014 "Photorealism: The Everyday Illuminated" Jonathan Novak Contemporary Art, Los Angeles, CA

2013 "Summer Sights: A Gallery Survey Exhibition," Bernarducci·Meisel Gallery, New York, NY

2013 “Photorealism Revisited,” Oklahoma City Museum of Art, Oklahoma City, OK

2010 "Drive," David Klein Gallery, Birmingham, MI

2013 “Route 66,” Skidmore Contemporary Art, Santa Monica, CA

2009 "Photorealism: A Closer Look," Scott Richards Contemporary Art, San Francisco, CA

2009 “Endless Summer Exhibition,” Lyons Weir Gallery, New York, NY

2008 “Fotofest,” New Gallery, Houston, TX

2008 "Summer Salon: Works on Paper" Lyons Wier Ortt Contemporary Art, New York, NY

2007 "High and Dry Smoke and Fog" Phantom Galleries LA Beverly Hills, Los Angeles, CA

2007 Bridge Art Fair, Art Murmur Gallery, Miami, FL

2007 Lyons Wier Ortt, New York, NY

2005 Auto Show, The Arts Center of the Capital Region, Troy, NY

2003 "Celebration of Contemporary Art," The Woodlands Resort and Conference Center, The Woodlands, TX

2001 "Sultry," Houston Community College, Houston, TX

== Noted collections ==
Pesterer Contemporary Fine Art, Zurich, Switzerland

The Seavest Collection of Contemporary Realism, New York, NY, USA

The Seven Bridges Foundation, Greenwich, CT, USA

Howard A. Tullman, Chicago, IL, USA

== Awards ==
2012 Pollock-Krasner Foundation Grant

2011 Finalist, Hunting Art Prize

2009 Finalist, Hunting Art Prize

== Work featured in ==
2013 "Roadster Reflections." American Art Collector, edited by Joshua Rose, Issue #89. March.

2012 Nob Hill Gazette, Front Cover. June.

2010 "Metal Beauty." American Art Collector, edited by Joshua Rose, Issue #61. November.

2009 “Heavy Metal.” American Art Collector, edited by Joshua Rose, Issue #47. September.

2009 "Illustration: Cadillac (detail)," Harper's Magazine, Front Cover. August.

2008 Oranges & Sardines: Summer 2008, by David Krump, Andy Nicholson, Meghan Punschke, and Didi Melendez. CreateSpace Independent Publishing Platform.

2008 New American Paintings: Juried Exhibitions in Print, Western Edition, Issue #78. Juror: Andrea Karnes, Curator, Modern Art Museum of Fort Worth, Fort Worth, TX.

2005 New American Paintings: Juried Exhibitions in Print, Western Edition, Issue #60. Juror: Fereshteh Daftari, Former Curator, The Museum of Modern Art, New York, NY.
