= Glennray Tutor =

American painter

- Dream of Love by Glennray Tutor. 2005, Oil on Canvas.
- Born: Glennray Tutor; August 25, 1950 (age 75); Kennett, Missouri
- Education: B.A., M.F.A., University of Mississippi
- Known for: Photorealistic painter
- Movement: Photorealism

Glennray Tutor (born 1950 in Kennett, Missouri) is an American painter who is known for his photorealistic paintings. He is considered to be part of the Photorealism art movement. His paintings are immersed with bright colors, nostalgic items, metaphor, and with a complete focus on detail. Tutor is a graduate of the University of Mississippi where he received his Bachelor of Arts degree in Art and English in 1974 and his Master of Fine Arts degree in Painting in 1976.

== Work ==
Glennray Tutor's earliest work was that of barren landscapes resembling the South West United States and Mexico, with titles such as The Road to the Mesa. This work is marked by muted earth colors and rich blacks and is called "The Structure Series." During this time he also illustrated several book covers by Michael Bishop which can be described as fantasy pieces.

Tutor's first Photorealist paintings were done in the early 1980s, without knowledge of the original Photorealism movement. His subject matter ranged from still lifes of mason jars, fireworks, and toys to rural landscapes. In the mid-1980s he became aware of the original Photorealism painters and was particularly receptive to the work of Ralph Goings.

By the end of the 1980s, Tutor's subject matter had almost exclusively become still lifes consisting of the small commonplace artifacts of daily life, often nostalgic items, such as glass jars, cola bottles, toys, and especially fireworks.

Many of Tutor's paintings have appeared in and on the covers of books, record albums, and magazines. He has participated in numerous group and solo exhibitions, at such venues as The Mississippi Museum of Art, Jackson; Cole Pratt Gallery, New Orleans; Frist Center For The Visual Arts, Nashville; Hahn Ross Gallery, Santa Fe, New Mexico; Gallery Henoch, New York, New York; International Monetary Fund, Washington, DC; Schmidt Bingham Gallery, New York, New York; Helander Gallery, New York; The World's Fair, New Orleans; Frank Marino Gallery, New York; Mendenhall Gallery, Los Angeles; and Jay Etkin Gallery, Santa Fe.

Tutor's work can be found in many public, corporate, and private collections, including The Seymour Lawrence Collection of American Art, The Roger Horchow Collection of Art, FedEx Corporation, The Howard Tullman Collection of Art, Universal Studios, NBC Network, Hospital Corporation of America, and 20th Century Fox Studios among others.

During the years of 1999 - 2000 his artwork was featured in a show known as "Outward Bound: American Art on the Brink of the Twenty-first Century: An Exhibition of American Contemporary Art" which was sponsored by the Mobil Corporation. Tutor's work was displayed alongside other artists such as Roy Lichtenstein, Chuck Close, Audrey Flack, Robert Gniewek and Robert Rauschenberg as well as many others. The traveling gallery show started in Washington, DC and then toured South Eastern Asia.

== Personal life ==
Glennray Tutor lives in Oxford, Mississippi.

== See also ==
- Photorealism
- Hyperrealism
- Ralph Goings
- Charles Bell
