= Idelle Weber =

American artist (1932–2020)

Idelle Lois Weber (born Tessie Pasternack; March 12, 1932 – March 23, 2020) was an American artist most closely aligned with the Pop art and Photorealist movements.

== Early life ==
Weber was born in Chicago, Illinois on March 12, 1932, as Tessie Pasternack. Adopted as an infant by Julius Earl and Minnie (née Wallach) Feinberg, she lived in Wilmette, Illinois until the age of eight, with a businessman father and a mother devoted to her cultural development. Early childhood gifts of a Brownie camera and a large magnifying glass were meaningful. She was curious and creative as a child. Her mother took her on weekly visits to the Art Institute of Chicago, her favorite works in the collection being those by Rembrandt, Edward Hopper, and the Thorne miniature rooms. She also spent a lot of time copying her Brenda Starr and Dick Tracy comic books.

At the age of eight, Weber's family relocated to Southern California in an effort to treat her severe allergies. The museum scene there was not as robust as in Chicago, but she found plenty to support her passion for art. She would ride her bicycle to Frank Perls' gallery for critiques on her own artwork. She was exposed to the work of modern masters Matisse, Rodin, and Degas. Her high school dissertation looked at the seemingly disparate work of Edward Hopper and Jackson Pollock. Receiving a full tuition, she attended Scripps College in Claremont, California. Briefly, Weber attended the Aspen Design Conference, which was deeply influential to her developing artistic style, introducing a graphic and bold aesthetic. She went on to study at UCLA, with William Brice, Frederick S. Wight, and Stanton Macdonald-Wright. She received a BA in 1954 and an MA in 1955. After school she shared a studio with Craig Kauffman and Walter Hopps and the three of them became engaged with images of New York School abstraction.

== Career ==
In 1956, Weber's work Observation of Sound, a charcoal work of the previous year, was selected from 5,000 entries by curator William S. Lieberman for inclusion in the Museum of Modern Art's show Recent Drawings USA. She showed under her unmarried name, Feinberg. In light of this success, Weber moved to New York to work and to secure a gallery affiliation. Sam Hunter, then curator at MoMA, arranged for her to meet art historian H. W. Janson, who admired Weber's work but stated that he did not include women painters in his books. Charles Allen, owner of the Allen Gallery, similarly indicated that he did not show women artists. Weber attended an illustration and design class taught by Alexander Liberman at the School of Visual Arts, but when she asked Robert Motherwell if she could audit his class at Hunter College, he responded that married women with children were not permitted to audit classes because they would not continue painting. Weber had married earlier that year. In 1958, her son was born, followed by a daughter in 1964, yet she continued painting.

She attended classes at the Brooklyn Museum and studied under Theodoros Stamos at the Art Students League, rented a studio in Brooklyn Heights, and showed her work in several group exhibitions. Finally, Weber signed with Bertha Schaefer Gallery in 1962. Her first solo show was there in January 1963 and featured her silhouette paintings. The Albright-Knox Gallery purchased Reflection (1962) from that show. She had two solo exhibitions at Bertha Schaefer Gallery. (Weber would be represented later by a string of galleries, including Hundred Acres, OK Harris, Schmidt-Bingham, and Jean Albano.) It was also around this time that she came to know Roy Lichtenstein, Andy Warhol, Jasper Johns, James Rosenquist, and other Pop artists through her contacts at the Castelli Gallery. She became particularly close with Yayoi Kusama, Lucas Samaras, Claes Oldenburg, and Agnes Martin.

During the early 1960s, Weber's work mainly consisted of silhouette paintings against brightly colored, checkerboard backgrounds. Her preferred subjects were anonymous figures engaged in everyday activities, such as a group of friends playing cards (Hearts, 1964), or business men riding escalators (Munchkins I, II, & III, 1964). Munchkins was the largest work she ever created; it was painted on three canvases butted together. She painted each canvas in a different room in her small apartment. She began making large-scale Plexiglas sculptures in 1965. Jumprope Lady was her first successful attempt at transposing her silhouette paintings into three-dimensions.

In the late 1960s, Weber switched from her early Pop aesthetic to Photorealist techniques. Working from photographs and slides of New York City, she made highly detailed paintings of fruit-stands (Bluebird, 1972), trash and litter (Heineken, 1976), which would become her dominant themes over the next several years. Weber became a leading member of the Photorealist movement and formed friendships with Duane Hanson, Robert Cottingham, Richard Estes, John DeAndrea, John Salt, and Ralph Goings, among others.

Weber taught graduate drawing and painting at NYU in the 1970s and would later teach art at Harvard University, the Art Barge in Amagansett, NY and the Victorian College of the Arts in Melbourne, Australia, where she was also artist-in-residence.

While teaching at Harvard in the 1990s, Weber began working in monotypes and created a series of small black and white works inspired by television coverage of the Gulf War. Moving from small to large scale, the experience working in monotype resulted in a dramatic change in her painting style. A severe allergy to most solvents forced her to stop working with oil paint in 1995. In 2000, she began working in collage, culminating in a major installation, Head Room, at the Contemporary Gallery at the Nassau County Museum of Art in Roslyn, NY. Weber continued to live and work in New York City. She died in Los Angeles on March 23, 2020, at the age of 88.

== Acquisition of Munchkin I, II, III ==
In 2013, the Chrysler Museum of Art acquired her painting, Munchkins, I, II, & III (1964), showing silhouetted business men riding the escalators of the PanAm Building, which had been completed in New York the year before. Online art publication Blouin ArtInfo announced the acquisition with the headline, "Chrysler Museum Acquires Original "Mad Men" Painting by Neglected Pop Artist Idelle Weber". The story also reported that the work was one of three by Weber acquired by the museum at that time. The other two paintings, High Ceiling—You Won’t Get This and Mr. Chrysler also reference the gender stereotypes of the American workplace in the 1960s. The titular Mr. Chrysler made the work all the more appropriate for that museum's collection. The purchase occurred at a time that Weber was resurfacing with renewed critical interest.

== Selected exhibitions ==
=== Solo exhibitions ===
- 1963, 1964 Bertha Schaefer Gallery, New York, NY.
- 1973, 1975, 1977 Hundred Acres Gallery, New York, NY.
- 1979, 1982 OK Harris Gallery, New York, NY.
- 1984 Siegel Contemporary Art, New York, NY.
- 1985, 1987 Ruth Siegel Ltd. New York, NY
- 1986 Arts Club of Chicago, Chicago, IL.
- 1987 Fendrick Gallery, Washington, DC.
- 1994, 1996, 1998 Schmidt-Bingham Gallery, New York, NY.
- 1994 Colorado State University, Fort Collins, CO.
- 1995 Victorian College of the Arts, Melbourne University, Australia.
- 1998 Bermuda National Gallery, Hamilton, Bermuda.
- 2004 Nassau County Museum of Art, Roslyn Harbor, NY.
- 2013 Hollis Taggart Galleries, New York, NY.
- 2018 Hollis Taggart, New York, NY.

=== Group exhibitions ===
- 1956 "Recent Drawings, U.S.A."—Museum of Modern Art, New York, NY.
- 1957 "New Talent"—Art in America and American Federation of Arts. [traveling exhibition]
- 1958 "Group Show"—Brooklyn Museum, Brooklyn, NY.
- 1961 "Modern American Drawings"—Museum of Modern Art, New York, NY. [traveling exhibition]
- 1963 "Pop Goes the Easel"—Contemporary Arts Museum Houston, TX.
- 1963 "Pop Art U.S.A."—Oakland Museum and California College of Arts and Crafts, Oakland, CA.
- 1964 "Contemporary Drawings"—Guggenheim Museum, New York, NY.
- 1964 "The Box Show"—Dwan Gallery, Los Angeles, CA.
- 1965 "The New American Realism"—Worcester Art Museum, Worcester, MA.
- 1965 "Pop Art and the American Tradition"—Milwaukee Art Museum, Milwaukee, WI.
- 1966 "Contemporary American Figure Painters"—Wadsworth Atheneum, Hartford, CT.
- 1967 "International Young Artists Exhibition: U.S.A. - Japan"—Japanese Cultural Forum, Tokyo, Japan.
- 1975 "Twenty-five Stills"—Whitney Museum of American Art. New York, NY.
- 1976 "Painting and Sculpture Today"—Indianapolis Museum of Art, Indianapolis, IN.
- 1978 "Women Artists '78," Women's Caucus for Art, CUNY Graduate Center, New York, NY
- 1980 "American Realism in the Industrial Age"—Cleveland Museum of Art, Cleveland, OH.
- 1990 "Issues in Post-Modernism"—Yale University Art Gallery, New Haven, CT.
- 1992 "Six Takes on Photorealism"—Whitney Museum of American Art at Champion, Stamford, CT.
- 2003 "Challenging Tradition: Women of the Academy, 1826-2003"—National Academy of Design, New York, NY.
- 2008 "Shock of the Real: Photorealism Revisited"—Boca Raton Museum of Art, Boca Raton, FL.
- 2010 "Seductive Subversion: Women Pop Artists, 1958-1968"—University of the Arts, Philadelphia, PA. [traveling exhibition]
- 2018 "Giant Steps: Artists and the 1960s"–Albright-Knox Art Gallery, Buffalo, NY.

== Selected public collections ==
- Albright-Knox Art Gallery, Buffalo, NY
- Arkansas Art Center, Little Rock, AR
- Art Institute of Chicago, Chicago, IL
- Boise Art Museum, Boise, ID
- Brooklyn Museum, Brooklyn, NY
- Chrysler Museum, Norfolk, VA
- Delaware Art Museum, Wilmington, DE
- Des Moines Art Center, Des Moines, IA
- Fogg Art Museum, Harvard University, Cambridge, MA
- Samuel P. Harn Museum of Art, Gainesville, FL (loan)
- Krannert Art Museum, University of Illinois, Champaign, Urbana, IL
- Los Angeles County Museum of Art (LACMA), Los Angeles, CA
- McNay Art Museum, San Antonio, TX
- Melbourne University, Victoria College of the Arts, Melbourne, Australia
- Memorial Art Gallery, University of Rochester, Rochester, NY
- The Metropolitan Museum of Art, New York, NY
- National Academy of Design, New York, NY
- National Museum of American Art, Washington, DC
- Nelson-Atkins Museum of Art, Kansas City, MO
- New York Public Library, New York, NY
- Fine Arts Museums of San Francisco, San Francisco, CA
- Santa Barbara Museum of Art, Santa Barbara, CA
- Santa Fe Art Foundation, Santa Fe, NM
- Tacoma Art Museum, Tacoma, WA
- Virginia Museum of Fine Arts, Richmond, VA
- Whitney Museum of American Art, New York, NY
- Yale University Art Gallery, New Haven, CT

== Selected bibliography ==
=== Books ===
- Battcock, Gregory. Super Realism: A Critical Anthology. E.P. Dutton & Company. New York, New York. 1975.
- Lindey, Christine. Surrealist Painting and Sculpture. William Morrow. New York, New York. 1980.
- Meisel, Louis and Helene Zucker Seeman. Photorealism. Harry N. Abrams. New York, New York. 1980.
- Rubenstein, Charlotte S. American Women Artists: From Early Indian Times to Present. G.K. Hall. Chicago, Illinois. 1982.
- Battcock, Gregory, ed. The American Photorealists: An Anthology. Fischer Fine Arts, Ltd. London, United Kingdom, 1983.
- Finch, Christopher. American Watercolors. Abbeville Press. New York, New York, 1986.
- Baur, John I. H. Realism Today: American Drawings from the Rita Rich Collection. National Academy of Design. New York, New York, 1987.
- Ward, John. American Realists Painting 1945-1960. UMI Press. Ann Arbor, Michigan, 1989.
- Ragans, Rosalyn. Art Connections. SRA-McGraw/Hill. Columbus, Ohio, 1997.
- New, Jennifer. Drawing From Life: The Journal as Art. Princeton Architectural Press. New York, New York, 2005.
- Sachs, Sid. "Idelle Weber: The Pop Years". Hollis Taggart Galleries. New York, New York, 2013.

=== Articles & reviews ===
- "New Talent in the U.S.A.," Art in America, March 1957.
- "Pop," Das Kunstwerk vol. 17, No.10, 1964.
- "Idelle Weber," New York Herald Tribune, May 30, 1964.
- Dore Ashton. "New York Commentary," Studio International no. 856, April, 1965, p. 168.
- "Idelle Weber," Arts Magazine, September, 1975.
- Linda Chase. "Photorealism: Post Modernist Illusionism," Art International, March/April 1976.
- John Perreault. "Photo Shock," SoHo Weekly News, January 22, 1976.
- Lorraine Gilligan. "Idelle Weber," Womanart no. 1, Fall 1977, p. XX.
- Ellen Lubell. "Idelle Weber," Arts Magazine, September 1977.
- William Zimmer. "Idelle Weber," Arts Magazine, June 1979.
- William Zimmer. "Idelle Weber," Arts Magazine, October 1982, p. 19.
- William Zimmer. "Idelle Weber," Arts Magazine, October 1983, p. 2.
- "Idelle Weber at O.K. Harris," Art in America, February 1983, pp. 132–3.
- Joan Marter. "Idelle Weber" Arts Magazine, November 1985, p. 123.
- John Russell. "Idelle Weber," New York Times, April 20, 1984.
- Paula Span. "Making a Business Out of Art for the Office," The Wall Street Journal, July 11, 1985, p. 22.
- Stephen Westfall. "Idelle Weber," Arts Magazine, March 1986, p. 129.
- Helen Ferrulli. "Pop Went Their Easels: How Industry Transformed the Art of the 60s and 70s," Arts and Entertainment Magazine, June 1991, p. 10.
- Holland Cotter. "Art in Review, An Uncommon Line," New York Times, July 30, 1993, p. C26.
- Valerie Steiker. The New Yorker, March 1994.
- Edith Newhall. ARTnews, Summer 1994.
- Grace Glueck. "Idelle Weber," New York Times, October 18, 1996, p. C1.
- Ann Landi. "Who Hails From Hopper?" ARTnews, April 1998.
- Helen A. Harrison. "Head Room," New York Times, June 21, 2004.
- Holland Cotter. "Idelle Weber: The Pop Years", The New York Times, April 18, 2013.
- Doug McClemont. "Idelle Weber", Artnews, September 2013, p. 98.
