= Denis Peterson =

American painter (born 1944)

Denis Peterson (born New York, 1944) is an American hyperrealist painter whose photorealist works have been exhibited at the Brooklyn Museum, Whitney Museum of American Art, Butler Institute of American Art, Tate Modern, Springville Museum of Art, Corcoran MPA, Museum of Modern Art CZ and Max Hutchinson Gallery in New York. He is a juror for the Modern Art Museum Barcelona.

== Life and work ==
Of Armenian descent, Denis Peterson was one of the first Photorealists to emerge in New York shortly after being awarded a teaching fellowship at Pratt Institute where he attained his MFA in Painting. "The first Photorealists were Chuck Close, Don Eddy, Richard Estes, Ralph Goings, Robert Bechtle, Audrey Flack, Denis Peterson, and Malcolm Morley. Each began practicing some form of Photorealism around the same time, often utilizing different modes of application and techniques, and citing different inspirations for their work. However, for the most part they all worked independent from one another."

"In the immediate wake of Photorealism, a new generation of Hyperrealist artists like Denis Peterson leveraged advancements in high-resolution photography to achieve heightened levels of detail, further complicating the notion of realism by mixing the seemingly objective with the artificial and subjective. Today, Photorealist tendencies continue to influence a diverse array of contemporary artists, including Richard Prince, Andreas Gursky, Jeff Koons and Kehinde Wiley."

"Peterson is widely acknowledged as the pioneer and primary architect of Hyperrealism, which was founded on the aesthetic principles of Photorealism. His work Dust to Dust is designated in art historical timelines as a hallmark painting bringing about the initial emergence of the Hyperrealism movement worldwide." Author Graham Thompson wrote, "One demonstration of the way photography became assimilated into the art world is the success of photorealist painting. It is also called super-realism or hyper-realism and painters like Richard Estes, Denis Peterson, Audrey Flack and Chuck Close often worked from photographic stills to create paintings that appeared to be photographs." Denis Peterson distinguished hyperrealism from photorealism making meticulous changes to a work's depth of field, color, and composition in order to emphasize a socially conscious message about contemporary culture, consumerism and politics.

Peterson has often utilized the hyperrealism painting style as a phenomenological vehicle for social change. In his work "Dust to Dust", Peterson asserts that a man of negligible social status who inhabits the lowest stratum of society is just as worthy of having his portrait painted as any titled individual or famous person, and, more importantly, just as deserving of having his humanity recognized. Figurative images in compressed space and incorporeal landscapes of social decadence are visual commentaries on the aftermath of genocides, diasporas, and cultural divides. "Because of a combination of the theme of the work and his technical abilities, Peterson's paintings have a timeless symbolic meaning rather than the mere appearance of a photograph. While hyper-real in definition, they are also breaking from the structures of photography as being an acceptable simulation of reality and instead, creating a sense of loss from "personalization and interaction."

"Originally, his floor-to-ceiling sized paintings centered around a single figure, with his monochromatic subjects characteristically cropped to appear as enlarged black and white photographs. Later, he developed a diverse number of original painting series, such as multiple phone booths in New York City. Although not a professional photographer, he has relied on his own camera shots to maintain a consistency of composition and subject matter as reliable reference studies. Several years ago, Denis utilized photorealism as a visual medium through which to portray the unthinkable: genocides. As with his controversial painting series on homelessness, his work centered on the indefatigable human spirit rather than on political and economic crucibles. More recently, he has been painting urbanscapes of gargantuan commercial billboards overlooking crowds of people scurrying about below, often unaware of what social messages loom above."

== Painting subjects ==
These photorealistic works are visually compelling; often bearing witness to historical evidence of grotesque mistreatment of people by governments, societies, and systemic classism. His earlier work exposed totalitarian regimes, raising political and moral questions with regard to third-world military governments. These hyper-real depictions were often seen as a legacy of hatred and intolerance.

Thematically, Peterson's hyper-realist works are presented in series. Many of his provocative paintings have confronted the human condition. "This instance of hyperrealism is a performance art. Viewers are deliberately made to notice the amazing amount of time and painstaking effort that went into portraying this. Peterson isn't showing off; he is a radical painter, compelling us with his dedication. The astonishing realism is in the context of reflected light from every other object in the scene. Western artists such as David, da Vinci and Denis Peterson are important in part because of their skill and innovation, but also because they come from cultures that dominate the modern global power scene. Renaissance painters catered to emerging capitalism, the sons in David’s painting Oath of the Horatii symbolize French colonies, and Peterson’s Darfur painting, “Don’t Shed No Tears” provokes America to intervene with her wealth."

== Themes of work ==
His more recent photorealistic works encompass meticulously detailed New York cityscapes that focus on imposing ten-story-high billboards as POP icons overlooking busy city streets, pedestrians, and vehicles. "In Peterson's paintings, people are present but are typically caught under the weight and pressure of billboards and advertisements that loom heavily over the streets they inhabit. For Peterson, this is a commentary on contemporary society and its effects on people." "Somewhere during the process of painting Peterson imbued something of himself into the work, which is why his images for me succeed where his contemporaries do not. He doesn't just paint street scenes, but for me these are his most effective images. Devoid of any human presence, his locations are ripe for ghosts, the atmosphere heavy with unassuaged yearning." "His most recent work involves street scenes with people being 'weighed down' by advertising billboards, like the ones showing New York. Some of his earlier work looked at the suffering felt by people imposed by governments and societies raising moral and political questions about military regimes."

"Denis Peterson’s hyperrealist paintings are visual statements peppered with underlying socio-economic paradigms. In viewing them, it becomes immediately apparent that techniques and methods are a product of his work, not the other way around. The illusion of reality as a transformational aesthetic is a virtual means to an end."

"People exist, and interact with the world around them. The artist himself/herself exists in Metamodernism, and comments on his/her world. One caveat – the artist is removed from, and he knows about that separation as he/she observes himself/herself observing people and the ordered/disordered socio/economic/political spacetimes they inhabit. Denis Peterson exemplifies this... characteristic of Metamodernism/Popomo, and at the same time his work addresses a sense of loss, pain/angst concerning our position in a culture dominated by corporate America. People are viewed (once again) as individuals, though caught in the overwhelming commodification of everything, some so completely lost, that they are no longer individuals. The images themselves seem to go beyond, past, refer back to photo realism, and photography. I see a connection to Social Realism because it often put a face to its own dogma by showing individuals caught in the social/political/cultural juggernaut. Peterson’s work inhabits these concerns."
