= Roberto Bernardi =

Italian painter

- Born: 1974 (age 51–52); Todi, Italy
- Known for: Painting, photorealism
- Spouse(s): Raphaella Spence (artist, frequent collaborative partner)

Roberto Bernardi (born 1974 in Todi, Italy) is a photorealist painter who explores the beauty of everyday life though the reflections and transparencies in his still life paintings, using as his main subject plates and glasses, kitchens appliances, dishwashers, fridges and more recently lollypops and candies.

== Biography ==
Bernardi's first works date back to the early 80s, and in 1993, upon graduating from high school, he moved to Rome where he worked as a restorer in the church of San Francesco a Ripa. In 1994 he decided to dedicate himself full-time to the creation of his own paintings, and after an initial foray with landscapes and portraits, Bernardi started concentrating on contemporary still life and turned towards a kind of realism closely associated to photorealism.

In 1999 Bernardi met Raphaella Spence, also a photorealist artist, with whom he occasionally created series of large-sized paintings painted together representing social scenes such as crowds at football stadiums. In 2007 some of these paintings were exhibited at the Musei Capitolini in Rome and auctioned by Sotheby's as a donation towards a humanitarian project in Uganda organized by the UNHCR.

In 2008, Eliot Cutler, an American lawyer and politician who was an independent candidate in Maine’s 2010 and 2014 gubernatorial races, invited Bernardi to Beijing to work on a commission. Bernardi painted for the Cutler Collection a painting titled "L'Edicola" that reflected this special moment in China’s history during the 2008 Olympic Games. This painting was exhibited in “The Beijing Project” in New York the following year.

In 2010, Eni, the Italian multinational oil and gas company, currently Italy's largest industrial company, added Bernardi to the group of young artists from across the world who work to uniquely interpret each moment of Eni's communication and commissioned Bernardi to do a painting to be added to their art collections.

In 2014 Bernardi was invited to exhibit in the “2014 Contemporary Realism Biennial” at the Fort Wayne Museum of Art in the United States.

== Exhibitions ==
In September 1994 Bernardi held his first solo exhibition, which marked the beginning of numerous solo shows. Major exhibitions of his work were held in New York at the Bernarducci Meisel Gallery between 2003 and 2016; in London at the Albemarle Gallery in 2003, curated by art critic, poet and writer Edward Lucie-Smith, in Norfolk at the Hermitage Museum and Gardens in 2009 and recently in 2017 in Singapore at the Opera Gallery.

Since 2004 he has participated in several museum shows worldwide along with other artists of the photorealist movement, these major shows started in 2004 at the New Britain Museum of American Art (New Britain, USA) , Herbert F. Johnson Museum of Art (Ithaca, Cornell University, USA), in 2005 at the Arnot Art Museum (Elmira, USA), in 2007 at the Musei Capitolini (Rome, Italy), in 2009 at the Manhattanville College (New York, USA), in 2010 at the Ringling College of Art and Design (Sarasota, USA), in 2012 at the Kunsthalle Tübingen (Tübingen, Germany), in 2013 at the Museo Thyssen-Bornemisza (Madrid, Spain), Birmingham Museum and Art Gallery (Birmingham, England), Oklahoma City Museum of Art (Oklahoma City, USA), in 2014 at the New Orleans Museum of Art (New Orleans, USA), in 2015 at the Museo de Bellas Artes de Bilbao (Bilbao, Spain), in 2016 at the Kumu Art Museum of Estonia (Tallinn, Estonia), Nassau County Museum of Art (Roslyn Harbor, USA), Osthaus Museum Hagen (Hagen, Germany) and Museum of Ixelles (Brussels, Belgium), in 2017 Parrish Art Museum (Water Mill, USA), Kunsthal Museum (Rotterdam, Netherlands) and Tampa Museum of Art (Tampa, Usa) and in 2018 at the Flint Institute of Arts (Flint, Usa).
