= Jonathan Novak =

American art dealer

- Born: United States
- Occupation: Art dealer

Jonathan Novak is an American art dealer.

== Biography ==
=== Early life and education ===
Novak graduated from Brandeis University in 1975.

=== Career ===
Following graduation, Jonathan worked for the Jane Kahan Gallery in New York City prior to opening his own gallery. Since 1978, Jonathan Novak has been a source for Contemporary American and European art specifically representing artists Sam Francis and Jim Dine.

With a wide-ranging inventory consisting of paintings, drawings, sculpture, and prints, one may find significant examples by Milton Avery, John Baeder, Robert Bechtle, Fernando Botero, Alexander Calder, Joseph Cornell, Richard Diebenkorn, Jim Dine, Jean Dubuffet, Richard Estes, Sam Francis, Helen Frankenthaler, Ralph Goings, David Hockney, Roy Lichtenstein, Robert Motherwell, Mimmo Paladino, James Rosenquist, Ed Ruscha, Saul Steinberg, Frank Stella, Donald Sultan, Wayne Thiebaud, Andy Warhol, and Tom Wesselmann.

Jonathan has been an exhibitor at international art fairs in Chicago, Miami, Palm Beach, San Francisco, Los Angeles, and New York and is a member of the Private Art Dealers of America), the International Fine Print Dealers of America as well as the Fine Art Dealers Association.
