= Raphaella Spence =

British painter

- Born: 28 December 1978 (age 47); London, United Kingdom
- Known for: Painting, Photorealism

Raphaella Beatrice Spence (born 1978) is a British photorealist and hyperrealist painter.

== Biography ==
Spence was born in London, England in 1978. At the age of twelve, she moved to Rome, Italy, with her family, where she completed her studies at St. George's British International School in 1997. Spence initially painted still lifes, but after being influenced by views of the Umbrian countryside, she turned towards a more photorealistic approach, painting landscapes. Her current works consist of high resolution digital camera images combined with freehand cityscape paintings.

== Exhibitions ==
In 2003, Spence had her first solo exhibition in the United States at the Bernarducci Meisel Gallery in New York. Since then, many of her works have been displayed at the Bernarducci Meisel Gallery, in both solo and group exhibitions. Her paintings have been included in numerous group exhibitions as well, including at the Vero Beach Museum of Art, Mana Art Center, Arnot Art Museum, Roberson Museum of Arts & Sciences, Chiostro del Bramante, Musei Capitolini, Ringling College of Art and Design, Manhattanville College, St. Paul's Gallery, Louis K. Meisel Gallery, Elaine Baker Gallery, Albemarle Gallery, Office of the United Nations High Commissioner for Refugees, Ringling College of Art and Design, Persterer Contemporary Fine Art, Galerie De Bellefeuille, Kunsthalle Tübingen, Oklahoma City Museum of Art, Birmingham Museum and Art Gallery, Thyssen-Bornemisza Museum, Jonathan Novak Contemporary Art, New Orleans Museum of Art, and Museo de Bellas Artes de Bilbao

=== Solo exhibitions ===
- 2014: "A Million Lights", Bernarducci Meisel Gallery, New York, NY
- 2012: "Night and Day", Bernarducci Meisel Gallery, New York, NY
- 2011: "Venice Reprise", Bernarducci Meisel Gallery, New York, NY
- 2009: "Beijing", Bernarducci Meisel Gallery, New York, NY
- 2007: "Crossroads", Bernarducci Meisel Gallery, New York, NY
- 2005: "Bridge of Colors", Bernarducci Meisel Gallery, New York, NY
- 2004: "Solo Show", Albemarle Gallery, London, England
- 2003: "Stolen Dreams", Bernarducci Meisel Gallery, New York, NY
