= Richard McLean (United States) =

Richard McLean (1934–2014) was a leading artist in the Photorealist movement.

== Biography ==
Born in Hoquiam, Washington, McLean graduated with a BFA from the California College of Arts and Crafts, where he had studied under Richard Diebenkorn, and received an MFA from Mills College in 1962.

McLean became well known for painting horses and western American subject matter in a photorealist style. Like other West Coast photorealists like Ralph Goings and Robert Bechtle, he was included in the exhibitions Twenty-Two Realists at the Whitney Museum of American Art (1970) and Documenta 5 (1972) in Kassel, Germany.

McLean taught at San Francisco State University for thirty years.
