= Frank Bernarducci =

American art dealer

Frank Bernarducci (born September 23, 1959) is a New York City art dealer and curator. He is currently the owner of Bernarducci Gallery, located at 525 West 25th Street in New York, NY. Bernarducci began exhibiting graffiti art in the 1980s in the East Village while being the director of Frank Bernarducci Gallery. Bernarducci continues to curate exhibitions featuring emerging and seasoned artists. His gallery is known for exhibiting realist and photorealist art.

== Education and early career ==
Bernarducci attended the School of Visual Arts from 1979 to 1982 and received his bachelor's degree in media arts, specifically graphic design and advertising, working as an advertising art director while still at school. While at SVA, Bernarducci also minored in film, living in a loft on East 17th Street off Union Square, a half block from Andy Warhol's factory. In 1979 Bernarducci met Warhol, who agreed to a cameo appearance in his first student film. While still in college in the early 1980s, Bernarducci was a frequent attendee at art openings in the East Village as well as at downtown nightclubs, most notably the Mudd Club, Pyramid, Kamikaze, Area, and Steve Rubell and Ian Schrager's Palladium. He and his friend Mark Moskin curated painting exhibitions at some of these late-night venues.

Bernarducci's art career was largely influenced by his father, Frank Sr., who was a painter and a student of the Hans Hofmann School of Art. Frank Sr. was also a founding member of the Phoenix Gallery, established in 1958 among the 10th Street co-op galleries at the height of the abstract expressionist movement known as The New York School.

In 1984 Bernarducci held the first art exhibition in his loft, curated by Steven Kaplan, and featuring a dozen East Village painters, including David Wojnarowicz. Encouraged by the success of this exhibition, Bernarducci followed in his father's footsteps, opening the Frank Bernarducci Gallery. In subsequent exhibitions, other notable artists included Ronnie Cutrone, Keith Haring, Daze, and Martin Wong.

Frank Bernarducci Gallery went on to hold regular hours and monthly exhibitions, including "Urban Abstraction", the first gallery exhibition exclusively dedicated to the abstract work-on-canvas of pre-eminent graffiti artists. At the opening, graffiti artists from across New York mixed with East Village artists and other guests. In 1986, Bernarducci curated an exhibition titled "Photosynthesis", which featured painters whose work incorporated photography in some way. The highlight of the show was four, two-foot dollar sign paintings by Andy Warhol. The first weekend after the opening, a call came from Leo Castelli Gallery saying that Andy Warhol was dead. Unless already sold, they asked that the paintings be returned immediately after the show's closing. Retail price of these works at that time was $6,500.

With the success of gallery artist Stephen Hannock and others, Bernarducci was able to move the gallery to the 560 Broadway building in SoHo. The inaugural exhibition featured the hand-painted photographs of photographer Ariadne Getty, the granddaughter of J. Paul Getty. Many of her celebrity friends attended the opening, including Bianca Jagger, Michael J. Fox and Brooke Shields.

== Galleries ==
Throughout the 1990s Bernarducci worked as director of two realist galleries, Tatischeff and Co and Fischbach Gallery, both on 57th Street. There he represented the paintings of John Stuart Ingle, Jane Wilson, Leigh Behnke, Lois Dodd and many others, including G. Daniel Massad, whom he continues to represent.

In September 2000, Frank Bernarducci opened Bernarducci Meisel Gallery at 37 West 57 Street in New York. The Gallery's mission was to exhibit the foremost contemporary Realist artists. Bernarducci curated many notable exhibitions at the Gallery, including 2008's "Painted Faces: Post Modern Portraits", which included many realist artists such as Mel Ramos, Chuck Close, Antonio Lopez, Alberto Vargas, Andy Warhol, Tom Wesselmann and more. "The New York Project" (2011) included paintings by artists such as Richard Estes, Ron Kleemann, and Raphaella Spence. In addition, Bernarducci curated an exhibition of artists belonging to the Sicilian group Il Gruppo di Scicli in 2012. This was the group's first exhibition in the United States.

In 2010, under Bernarducci's guidance, the gallery moved to the third floor of the same building, expanding to twice its former size. Upon its relocation, the gallery became the first LEED Certified Art Gallery in New York City.

In 2017, Bernarducci opened a project space, Bernarducci Gallery Chelsea, specializing in Precisionist realism. In September 2017, an exhibition featuring artists Ester Curini, Hubert DeLartigue, Max Ferguson, Park Hyung Jin, Sylvia Maier, Sharon Moody and Nathan Walsh, among others, inaugurated the new venue. On March 1 2018, Bernarducci Gallery relocated to its permanent location at 525 West 25th Street.

== Film and TV ==
In 1987, Steven Spielberg and director Matthew Robbins selected the Frank Bernarducci Gallery artist Joe Davis for their film, Batteries Not Included. Spielberg chose Joe Davis's paintings to represent the East Village art scene, of which Bernarducci was a well-known figure. The story line paralleled the real-life story of the artist, who was being evicted from his studio to make way for development.

In 2012, Bernarducci appeared as himself in two episodes of Bravo TV's reality series "Gallery Girls", a show about seven young women starting out in the New York art world. Both episodes were filmed on location at the Bernarducci Meisel Gallery in Manhattan.
