= Julie Harvey (artist) =

American contemporary artist and choreographer

- Born: September 30, 1963 (age 63); United States
- Known for: Visual Art

Julie Harvey (born September 30, 1963 in United States) is a contemporary art painter, multimedia producer, video director and choreographer. She lives and works in New York City.

== Life and work ==
Harvey graduated BFA, magna cum laude from Virginia Commonwealth University and received her MFA from Parsons School of Design in New York.

Harvey has exhibited her paintings with the Bernarducci Meisel Gallery, Kathleen Cullen, and Kenise Barnes, among others.

The Museum of Modern Art’s research center displayed Ms. Harvey’s work in "Documenting the Feminist Past: An Artworld Critique, 1960 to Now". She has also been featured in many television documentaries and news programs: on WCBS-TV, WPIX, and PBS stations.

Harvey has worked on projects with well-known artists such as Lori Anderson and The Paul Taylor Dance Company. She has created, produced, and directed multimedia events that have included musicians, dancers, video, lighting designers, and visual artists. She is known for her controversial nude portraits of go-go dancing art dealers and the terrorist Osama bin Laden. She also painted the actor Rip Torn for Alec Baldwin’s character who displayed the artwork in episode 108 of the TV series "30 Rock".

In September 2009 she created and choreographed a dance ensemble that took place within the Matisse Gallery at the Museum of Modern Art as part of the video series "30 Seconds" by filmmaker Thilo Hoffmann.

In 1995 she received a grant from Mitsubishi Chemical America for her experimental use of Alpolic, a new aluminum based panel that she established as a support for paintings and sculptures. Through this research, she received a US Patent for bonding artist’s materials to these coated architectural panels. Harvey received a project sponsorship from the New York Foundation for the Arts in 1999 to help fund her "Liberty Mural", a monumental 75-foot public artwork that celebrates the historic legacy of Lower Manhattan. The "Liberty Mural" is located at 59 Maiden Lane in New York City. On September 11, 2001 the "Liberty Mural" along with the contents of Ms. Harvey's studio was damaged by the terrorist attacks on the World Trade Center. Ms. Harvey quickly suited up her camera equipment and photographed Ground Zero and the surrounding neighborhood throughout the day on 9/11; her photographs have been seen around the world. In 2002 she received a project grant from the ED Foundation to assist in the development of the design for a new public artwork.
