= David Parrish =

American artist (1939–2021)

David Buchanan Parrish
- Born: 19 June 1939; Birmingham, Alabama
- Died: 5 December 2021 (aged 82); Huntsville, Alabama
- Resting place: Elmwood Cemetery, Birmingham, Alabama
- Movement: Photorealism; Hyperrealism

David Buchanan Parrish (1939–2021) was an American artist who was a part of the photorealism movement. He is most known for his paintings of motorcycles.

== Biography ==
David Parrish was born on June 19, 1939 in Birmingham, Alabama. His father was A. Leonard Parrish and his mother was Jemima Buchanan Parrish. Before David Parrish was born, his father worked as a circus performer, where he played a tuba-like instrument in the circus band and rode motorcycles with David's mother-to-be. During David's childhood, his father worked as a banker in Birmingham. David Parrish was interested in art from a young age and was encourage by his mother, who was also a painter.

Parrish attended Phillips High School in Birmingham and graduated in 1957. He attended Washington and Lee University in Lexington, Virginia from 1957 to 1958. After a trip to New York City, he transferred to University of Alabama. He graduated with a bachelor of fine arts in 1961. After graduating, he moved to Huntsville, Alabama.

Parrish initially aspired to be a magazine illustrator. When he was unable to establish such a career, he gained employment in the Aerospace industry. For almost a decade, he worked making technical drawings in the Aerospace industry, including for NASA. Parrish's work in technical design seems to have helped himhone his skills for his work in photorealist painting.

Parrish died on December 5, 2021 at his home in Huntsville at the age of 82. He is buried in Elmwood Cemetery in Birmingham, Alabama.

== Art ==
Parrish's first photorealistic work was a drawing based on a photo of jazz musician Miles Davis that he had found in Esquire magazine. His professors, who were telling him that he should be emulating the non-objective works of Jackson Pollock, Philip Guston, and Willem de Kooning, were angered by the drawing. Despite them telling him that he should make his art more abstract and expressive, he continued to pursue photorealism.

Parrish is known for his paintings of motorcycles. His fixation on motorcycles comes from his relationship with his father. Parrish's father never wanted him to ever ride a motorcycle, and so Parrish became fascinated with his father's former "hidden and forbidden" former carnival lifestyle. Later in his career, Parrish also became somewhat known for his paintings of kitsch porcelain figurines.

Some of Parrish's paintings lack a clear focal point, which when combined with the rich color and refracted light, give these paintings an abstract quality.

== Exhibitions ==
- 1971: (First solo show), Brooks Memorial Art Gallery, Memphis, Tennessee.
- 2014: Photorealism: The Everyday Illuminated, Jonathan Novak Contemporary Art, Los Angeles, California
- 2019: David Parrish: High Gloss, Louis K. Meisel Gallery, New York, NY.
- 2024: Chrome: David Parish, Huntsville Museum of Art, Huntsville, Alabama.
