= William Nichols (artist) =

American landscape artist

- Born: 1942 (age 83–84); Chicago, Illinois, US
- Education: University of Illinois, Urbana, School of the Art Institute of Chicago Slade School of Fine Art
- Known for: Painting, Landscape painting
- Style: Representational
- Movement: Realism, Photorealism
- Awards: Fulbright Hayes Grant
- Website: William Nichols Fine Art

William Nichols, Overgrown Garden, oil on canvas, 63" x 110", 1984.

William Nichols (born 1942) is an American artist known for highly detailed, tactile landscape paintings that combine physical scale with intimacy. His work depicts unassuming gardens, forests, ponds, and streams rather than grand vistas, in dense, close-up screens of foliage, thicket or water that immerse viewers within the experience rather outside it.

Nichols developed his mature style in the 1970s, combining painterly traditions going back to Impressionism with reemerging movements such as Realism and Photorealism; critic John Perreault called his approach, "Photo-Impressionism." He has exhibited throughout the United States and abroad, including at OK Harris Gallery in New York (1979–2013), the San Francisco Museum of Modern Art, Milwaukee Museum of Art, Butler Institute of American Art, Kaohsiung Museum of Fine Arts (Taiwan), and Gulbenkian Museum (Lisbon); his work belongs to many private and public museum collections.

In addition to reviews in national publications, Nichols's work appears in several art historical surveys of Realism and landscape painting, including The Artist and the American Landscape and Contemporary American Realism Since 1960, among others. Critic Mac McCloud observed that Nichols's "meticulous craft and precise observation of shape, edge, color and light" rendered his work "almost beyond reality […] alive with growth and transformation, teeming with insects and sweltering weather and yet, in the eternal aesthetic paradox it is motionless." Gallerist Ivan Karp wrote, "the vital pulse" of Nichols's paintings defies "the conviction that 400 years of depictions of the natural world nullify the ability of living artists to produce landscapes of high consequence."

== Life and career ==
Nichols was born in Chicago, Illinois in 1942. He spent parts of his youth in upper Wisconsin hiking, fishing and exploring, memories of which continue to inform his work. He studied at the University of Chicago and the School of the Art Institute of Chicago (BFA, 1966), before earning an MFA from the University of Illinois, Urbana in 1968; a Fulbright Hayes Grant facilitated postgraduate studies at the Slade School of Fine Art in London in 1968–9. During this early period, he painted in an abstract expressionist style, before turning to surrealist-flavored figurative work, and slightly surreal landscapes after college.

In the early 1970s, Nichols reconceived his work from scratch, turning to the landscape, and painting from nature, like the Impressionists. His mature, painterly realist vocabulary developed intuitively and incorporated influences from Impressionism to Japanese woodblock prints and screens; inspired by photography's ability to capture fleeting qualities of light with precision and clarity, he began using it as reference to facilitate a more thorough reflection on specific, sometimes extraordinary moments or events, such as the freak, early snowstorm depicted in First Snow Santa Fe (2012). In combination with his rapid, gestural application of paint, it enables him to achieve both the spontaneity of Impressionism and the visual believability of Photorealism.

In 1974–5, Nichols began exhibiting professionally at Deson Zaks Gallery and the Hyde Park Art Center (Chicago), and in solo shows at the University of Wisconsin, Milwaukee and Lamagna Gallery (New York). In 1979, OK Harris held the first of twelve solo exhibitions (through 2013) of his work; he has also shown at galleries such as Tory Folliard (Milwaukee), Robert Kidd (Birmingham), and Thomas Paul (Los Angeles), and internationally, in Czechoslovakia, Germany, the Philippines, Portugal, Spain, Sweden, and Taiwan. Nichols taught at the University of Wisconsin, Milwaukee from 1970 to 1996, retiring as Professor of Art Emeritus. He now works and lives in Chicago with his wife, Sandra.

William Nichols, First Snow Santa Fe, oil on canvas, 60" x 90", 2012.

== Work ==
Nichols's style bridges seemingly contradictory movements such as Realism and Photorealism with the painterly traditions of Impressionism and Abstract Expressionism; as a result, art historians and critics sometimes create labels for his work such as "Painterly Realism," "Photo-Impressionism," or "Gestural Photorealism." Hallmarks of signature works, such as Overgrown Garden (1984), include: a focus on the landscape in fragmented close-up rather than vista-like views; large scale; gestural paint handling that creates both painstaking, tactile detail and abstract, lyrical patterning; and an atmospheric quality of light that derives from his use of photographic reference and Impressionistic understanding of color theory.

Curator John Arthur emphasizes Nichols's framing of the landscape with close, screen-like, enveloping views that often lack contextual clues such as horizon, and merely hint at the expanses beyond with light penetrating dense enclosures of thicket and foliage (e.g., Along a Road in Door County, 2016). Nichols enhances the effect with scale to create a sense for viewers of being surrounded rather than approaching scenes frontally. Scale plays a further role in how his paintings are perceived. At a proper distance, his gestural brushstrokes and loose stains of wet, transparent color coalesce and sharpen into true-to-life images of light, atmosphere and organic form at a proper distance; up close, they dissolve into lyrical, abstract patterning in works such as Reflected Fall (2004) that American Arts Quarterly wrote "might appeal on abstract terms to admirers of Jackson Pollock." Describing the effect, Carter Ratcliff wrote "an insistent but light, transparent touch covers surface with patterns which, at a distance, resolve into flurries of blossoms and leaves" and a "delicately brooding quality."

William Nichols, Along a Road in Door County, oil on canvas, 68" x 72", 2016.

The high level of detail and realism in Nichols's paintings distinguishes him from Impressionists and has prompted writers to liken his work to painterly landscape artists, such as Winslow Homer and Jane Freilicher, and to Photorealism. He differs, however, from the detached preference for banal, hard, clean reflective surfaces of many Photorealists, both in his softer, moodier, more romantic approach and his interest in his pictorial subjects. Curator Louis Zona suggests that he places content above formal interplay: "Nichols creates idealized natural vistas that draw us in and cause us to imagine what lies beyond the scope of each painting. In a sense, they are about how nature affects us and less about recording its lovely nuances."

== Collections and recognition ==
Nichols's work belongs to the public collections of the Milwaukee Art Museum, Butler Institute of American Art, John and Mable Ringling Museum of Art, Haggerty Museum, Erie Art Museum, Museum of New Art (MONA), Rahr West Art Museum, Stanford University, and the State of Illinois Governor's Mansion; his work has also been acquired by several prominent corporate and private collections.

Nichols has been featured in several art historical surveys of Realism and landscape painting, including Contemporary American Realism Since 1960 (1981), Facing Reality: Twentieth-Century American Realist and Realistic Drawings in Perspective (1986), Spirit of Place: Contemporary Landscape Painting & The American Tradition (1989), The Artist and the American Landscape(1998), Green Woods & Crystal Waters: The American Landscape Tradition (2000), and Landschaft Als Weltsicht.
