= Marilyn (Vanitas) =

1977 painting by Audrey Flack

Marilyn (Vanitas) is an oil over acrylic on canvas painting by Audrey Flack executed in 1977. It has the dimensions of 96 x 96 inches. This contemporary piece is part of a collection Flack compiled titled Vanitas. It focuses heavily on an intensely colored, realistic presentation, symbolism dating back to historical work, formal sources, and historical context. The work is in the collection of the University of Arizona Museum of Art.

== Formal Aspects ==
An opened book page with a photograph of the icon Marilyn Monroe is the focal point of Flack’s piece. This is one of the few objects without intense coloration, however the high contrast of black and white unifies it with the surrounding. Most shapes in the piece are curved and rounded, however a sepia-toned, squared photograph lies on top of the text of the book. Unlike the grown woman illustrated on the page, two children are shown in this photo. The photograph is a picture of the artist as a child.

== Symbolism ==
Josephine Withers describes Flack’s attention to precise details: “If these objects, which are an intimate part of her own life, seem rich, sensuous, and precious, it is because Flack herself has invested them with those qualities.” The objects surrounding Marilyn include a rose, fruit which is both whole and cut, a calendar, an hourglass, a pocket watch, a drinking glass, pearls, paint pots, a mirror, a candle, cosmetics, a photograph, and wrinkled cloth, which the objects rest upon. These objects in nature and color come across as feminine, reflecting Marilyn’s public persona. Many of the objects are reflective and Flack made a point to include visible shine on them. Two mirrors are shown, emphasizing this – one of which reflects Marilyn’s face.

== Similar Work ==
A piece which Flack may have drawn inspiration from is David Bailly’s Vanitas Still Life with Portrait of a Young Painter. Like Flack’s work, Bailly incorporates symbols such as flowers, portraits, candles, books, hourglasses, glasses, and jewelry.

== Iconography ==
Flack seemed to identify with the ideals of feminine behavior and presence, which Marilyn Monroe was expected to possess. The symbols of beauty are more obvious as they take the form of cosmetics and flowers. Likewise, the pocket watch, hourglass, and calendar refer to the passage of time straight-forwardly. The fruit and flowers also symbolize time in that they will decompose. The discolored photograph pictured is outdated compared to its surroundings, which implies time passage as well. The depiction of a candle may be in reference to the religious roots of the memento mori, creating a scene similar to an altar piece. Marilyn Monroe remains an American icon, reaching height as she performed for soldiers in Korea in 1954.
