= John Kacere =

American painter (1920–1999)

- Born: John C. Kacere; 23 June 1920; Walker, Iowa, U.S.
- Died: 5 August 1999 (aged 79); Cedar Rapids, Iowa, U.S.
- Education: M.F.A., University of Iowa
- Known for: Painting
- Movement: Abstract expressionism, photorealism
- Patrons: Louis K. Meisel

John C. Kacere (23 June 1920 – 5 August 1999) was an American painter. Originally an abstract expressionist, Kacere adopted a photorealist style in 1963. Nearly all of his photorealist paintings depict the midsection of the female body. He is considered one of the original photorealists, although he rejected the term.

== Biography ==
John Kacere was born to a Lebanese-American family in Iowa in 1920. His parents were the Reverend Joseph Kacere and Mary Kacere. He earned his B.F.A. and his M.F.A. from the University of Iowa in 1949 and 1950 respectively.

Kacere painted his first photorealist painting in 1969 involving the midsection of a woman dressed in lingerie. It was over three times life size. In 1978 one of his paintings was used as the cover of musician Jorge Santana's first album (Jorge Santana is the younger brother of famous Carlos Santana). Kacere continued this type of painting throughout the rest of his career, making it an icon of the photorealism movement. In the early 1980s, Kacere branched away from this theme and included the entire body of a woman in lingerie, but returned to his original midsection of the female body in 1988. Kacere's paintings are figurative but can be considered still lifes or even landscapes.

He began his teaching career in 1950 at the University of Manitoba in Winnipeg, Canada. He also taught at the University of Florida, Arizona State University, the Rhode Island School of Design, New York University, the University of New Mexico, and Cooper Union and the Parsons School of Design in New York City.

His paintings are in the public collections of several institutions, including the Stedelijk Museum in Amsterdam, the Portland Museum of Art, and the Speed Art Museum in Louisville, Kentucky.

He died in 1999 from Alzheimer's disease.
