= Hilo Chen =

Taiwanese-American painter

- Born: October 15, 1942 (age 83); Yilan, Taiwan
- Known for: Painting
- Movement: Photorealism

Hilo Chen (born October 15, 1942) is a Taiwanese-born American painter. He is best known for his photorealistic paintings of the female figure.

Chen was born in Yilan. He lives and works in New York. His work is in major museum collections throughout the world including the Solomon R. Guggenheim Museum and the Taipei Fine Arts Museum.

== See also ==
- Taiwanese art
