= Tom Blackwell =

American hyperrealist (1938–2020)

Thomas Leo Blackwell (1938 – April 8, 2020) was an American hyperrealist of the original first generation of Photorealists, represented by Louis K. Meisel Gallery. Blackwell is one of the Photorealists most associated with the style. He produced a significant body of work based on the motorcycle, as well as other vehicles including airplanes. In the 1980s, he also began to produce a body of work focused on storefront windows, replete with reflections and mannequins. By 2012, Blackwell had produced 153 Photorealist works.

Blackwell was born in Chicago, Illinois. He started out his career as an abstract-expressionist, but was moved to try his hand at the Pop art movement of the 1960s. It was with his Post-Pop paintings that Blackwell garnered early success; in 1969, his painting "Gook", which was a reaction to the horrors of the Vietnam War, was included in "Human Concern Personal Torment" at the Whitney Museum of American Art. As the artist recounted for the Currier Museum in 2015, "[i]n the late 1960s, I was still finding my voice as an artist. At that point, I was doing Post-Pop paintings, combining imagery from photo-derived sources. One of these included a section of chrome tailpipes, and as I worked on this painting I realized that the rest of the imagery felt extraneous."

By the 1970s, Blackwell had abandoned his earlier Pop sensibilities and was painting in the newly emerging Photorealist style. His early large-scale paintings of motorcycles and engines, highlighted reflective chrome surfaces. His later works continued to build upon this series, and expanded to include a series of storefront windows scenes, which capture layered imagery reflecting from the glass.

Blackwell's paintings are in many prestigious museum collections, including the Art Museum of Southeast Texas, the Museum of Modern Art, the Solomon R. Guggenheim Museum, and the Parrish Art Museum, amongst others.

Blackwell died on April 8, 2020, as a result of complications from COVID-19. He was 82 years old.
