= Nathan Wasserberger =

Polish-born Jewish American painter

- Born: June 24, 1928; Chrzanów, Poland
- Died: April 23, 2012 (aged 83); New York City
- Resting place: Mount Hebron Cemetery, Queens, New York
- Education: Pratt Institute, Art Students' League, Académie Julian
- Known for: Painting

Nathan Wasserberger (1928-2013) was a Jewish Polish painter, known for his portrait paintings, including in particular nudes and depictions of women in kimono. Originally from Chrzanów, Poland, he survived the Holocaust and emigrated to the United States in 1946 or 1947. Seven photographs of Wasserberger and 67 photographs of his paintings, are held in the Archives and Special Collections of the Smithsonian American Art Museum in Washington, D.C.

Born June 24, 1928, in Chrzanów, Poland, Wasserberger survived the Buchenwald concentration camp and settled in New York City in 1946 or 1947. He studied art at the Pratt Institute and under Ivan Olinsky and Byron Brown at the Art Students' League in New York, as well as at the Académie Julian in Paris in the late 1940s, and won awards for his paintings while still a student. Many of the paintings he produced during his first years in the United States were directly influenced by, or addressed themes of, his experience in the Holocaust; though Wasserberger indicated in interviews that "these early works meant a great deal to him at the time," he also said that he considered them amateur, and destroyed them all. Wasserberger reportedly said that he "realized," at some point in the 1950s, that "by dwelling on the past I was in effect continuing the imprisonment I was so happy to escape." He then made a conscious effort to shift his painting style, to one which has been described as "luminous," "spirit-lifting," and possessing of "buoyancy."

Wasserberger sold many of his works through the Park South Gallery located in the Carnegie Hall building. In 1967, SoHo gallery owner Louis K. Meisel published a book about the artist, entitled simply Nathan Wasserberger. In 1969, Wasserberger produced a number of paintings for use in the film Me, Natalie.

While a majority of his works are portraits of beautiful women of various ethnicities, either clothed or nude, they also include self-portraits, and images of jazz musicians, rabbis, John F. Kennedy, Toshiro Mifune as he appeared in the film Yojimbo, and other men of various ages and appearances, as well as some group scenes, and at least one portrait of a dog.

Wasserberger married twice. His first wife was named Marleen Nienhuis, and his second, to whom he was still married when he died, was Keiko Miura Wasserberger.

He died in New York on April 23, 2012, and is buried in Mount Hebron Cemetery in Queens, New York.
