= Photorealism =

Contemporary art movement

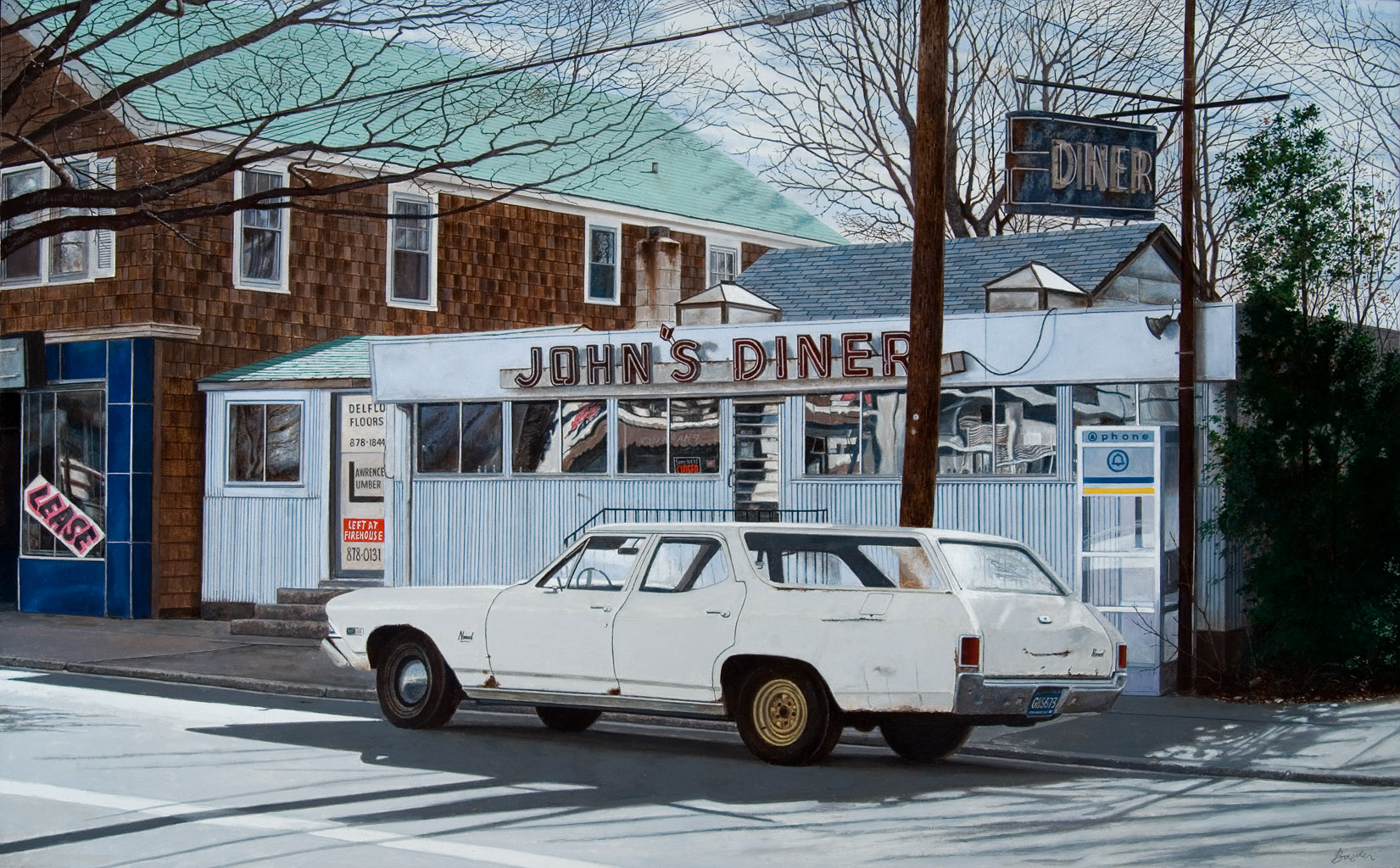
John's Diner with John's Chevelle, 2007. John Baeder, oil on canvas, 30×48 inches

Photorealism is a genre of art that encompasses painting, drawing and other graphic media, in which an artist studies a photograph and then attempts to reproduce the image as realistically as possible in another medium. Although the term can be used broadly to describe artworks in many different media, it is also used to refer to a specific art movement of American painters that began in the late 1960s and early 1970s.

== History ==
=== Origins ===
As a full-fledged art movement, Photorealism evolved from Pop Art and as a counter to Abstract Expressionism as well as Minimalist art movements in the late 1960s and early 1970s in the United States. Photorealists use a photograph or several photographs to gather the information to create their paintings and it can be argued that the use of a camera and photographs is an acceptance of Modernism. However, artists' admission of their use of photographs in Photorealism was met with intense criticism when the movement began to gain momentum in the late 1960s, despite the fact that visual devices had been used since the fifteenth century to aid artists with their work.

Louis K. Meisel states in his books and lectures that the invention of photography in the nineteenth century had three effects on art:

- Portrait and scenic artists were deemed inferior to the photograph and many turned to photography as careers.
- Within nineteenth and twentieth-century art movements, it is well documented that artists used the photograph as source material and as an aid—however, they went to great lengths to deny the fact fearing that their work would be misunderstood as imitations.
- Through the photograph's invention, artists were open to a great deal of new experimentation, thus the culmination of the invention of the photograph was a break in art's history towards the challenge facing the artist—since the earliest known cave drawings—trying to replicate the scenes they viewed.

By the time the Photorealists began producing their bodies of work the photograph had become the leading means of reproducing reality and abstraction was the focus of the art world. Realism continued as an ongoing art movement, even experiencing a reemergence in the 1930s, but by the 1950s modernist critics and Abstract Expressionism had minimalized realism as a serious art undertaking. Though Photorealists share some aspects of American realists, such as Edward Hopper, they tried to set themselves as much apart from traditional realists as they did Abstract Expressionists. Photorealists were much more influenced by the work of Pop artists and were reacting against Abstract Expressionism.

Pop Art and photorealism were both reactionary movements stemming from the ever-increasing and overwhelming abundance of photographic media, which by the mid 20th century had grown into such a massive phenomenon that it was threatening to lessen the value of imagery in art. However, whereas the Pop artists were primarily pointing out the absurdity of much of the imagery (especially in commercial usage), the Photorealists were trying to reclaim and exalt the value of an image.

The association of photorealism with trompe-l'œil is a wrongly attributed comparison, an error in observation or interpretation made by many critics of the 1970s and 1980s. Trompe-l'œil paintings attempt to "fool the eye" and make the viewer think he is seeing an actual object, not a painted one. When observing a Photorealist painting, the viewer is always aware that they are looking at a painting.

=== Definition ===
The word Photorealism was coined by Louis K. Meisel in 1969 and appeared in print for the first time in 1970 in a Whitney Museum catalogue for the show "Twenty-two Realists". It is also sometimes labeled as Super-Realism, New Realism, Sharp Focus Realism, or hyperrealism.

Louis K. Meisel, two years later, developed a five-point definition at the request of Stuart M. Speiser, who had commissioned a large collection of works by the Photorealists, which later developed into a traveling show known as 'Photo-Realism 1973: The Stuart M. Speiser Collection', which was donated to the Smithsonian Institution in 1978 and is shown in several of its museums as well as traveling under the auspices of 'site'. The definition for the 'originators' was as follows:

1. The Photo-Realist uses the camera and photograph to gather information.
2. The Photo-Realist uses a mechanical or semi-mechanical means to transfer the information to the canvas.
3. The Photo-Realist must have the technical ability to make the finished work appear photographic.
4. The artist must have exhibited work as a Photo-Realist by 1972 to be considered one of the central Photo-Realists.
5. The artist must have devoted at least five years to the development and exhibition of Photo-Realist work.

=== Styles ===
Photorealist painting cannot exist without the photograph. In Photorealism, change and movement must be frozen in time which must then be accurately represented by the artist. Photorealists gather their imagery and information with the camera and photograph. Once the photograph is developed (usually onto a photographic slide) the artist will systematically transfer the image from the photographic slide onto canvases. Usually this is done either by projecting the slide onto the canvas or by using traditional grid techniques. The resulting images are often direct copies of the original photograph but are usually larger than the original photograph or slide. This results in the photorealist style being tight and precise, often with an emphasis on imagery that requires a high level of technical prowess and virtuosity to simulate, such as reflections in specular surfaces and the geometric rigor of man-made environs.

=== Artists ===
The first generation of American Photorealists includes the painters Richard Estes, Ralph Goings, Chuck Close, Charles Bell, Audrey Flack, Don Eddy, Denis Peterson, Robert Bechtle, Ron Kleemann, Richard McLean, John Salt, Ben Schonzeit, and Tom Blackwell. Often working independently of each other and with widely different starting points, these original Photorealists routinely tackled mundane or familiar subjects in traditional art genres--landscapes (mostly urban rather than naturalistic), portraits, and still lifes.

With the birth of the Photorealist movement, many painters who were related to Photorealism, continued to pursue and refine their techniques; they became the second generation of Photorealists. These painters included John Baeder, Hilo Chen, Jack Mendenhall, Ken Marschall, David Parrish and Idelle Weber.

In the United Kingdom of Great Britain and Northern Ireland, photorealist approaches were favoured by many artists including Mike Gorman and Eric Scott. The introduction of these European painters to a wider US audience was brought about through the 1982 'Superhumanism' exhibition at the Arnold Katzen Gallery, New York.

Though the movement is primarily associated with painting, Duane Hanson and John DeAndrea are sculptors associated with photorealism for their painted, lifelike sculptures of average people that were complete with simulated hair and real clothes. They are called Verists.

=== Since 2000 ===
Dream of Love (2005), oil on canvas. Example of Photorealist Glennray Tutor's work

Though the height of Photorealism was in the 1970s, the movement continues and includes several of the original photorealists as well as many of their contemporaries. According to Meisel and Chase's Photorealism at the Millennium, only eight of the original thirteen photorealists were still creating Photorealist work in 2002. As of September 2020, Richard Estes is the only remaining original Photorealist actively working in the Photorealist style.

Artists Robert Bechtle, Charles Bell, Tom Blackwell, Ralph Goings, John Kacere, Ron Kleemann, Audrey Flack and Chuck Close have died; Don Eddy, Denis Peterson, Ben Schonzeit have moved away from Photorealism; and Robert Cottingham no longer considers himself a photorealist.

Newer Photorealists are building upon the foundations set by the original Photorealists. Examples would be the influence of Richard Estes in works by Anthony Brunelli or the influence of Ralph Goings and Charles Bell in works by Glennray Tutor. However, this has led many to move on from the strict definition of photorealism as the emulation of the photograph. Photorealism is also no longer simply an American art movement. Starting with Franz Gertsch in the 1980s Clive Head, Raphaella Spence, Bertrand Meniel, and Roberto Bernardi are several European artists associated with photorealism that have emerged since the mid-1990s. This internationalization of photorealism is also seen in photorealist events, such as The Prague Project, in which American and non-American photorealist painters have traveled together to locations including Prague, Zurich, Monaco and New York, to work alongside each other in producing work.

The evolution of technology has brought forth photorealistic paintings that exceed what was thought possible with paintings; these newer paintings by the photorealists are sometimes referred to as "Hyperrealism". With new technology in cameras and digital equipment, artists are able to be far more precision-oriented and can produce imagery using a wider range of media. The artist Bill Fink has developed his own technique for creating photorealistic images using soil, pollen, human hair, and cremated human remains.

Photorealism's influence and popularity continues to grow, with new books such as Juxtapoz's 2014 book entitled Hyperreal detailing current trends within the artistic genre. Since the 2020s, generative artificial intelligence has increasingly been capable of producing photorealistic images, with text-to-image models such as Imagen demonstrating a high degree of photorealism in generated imagery by 2022.

== List of photorealists ==
Original photorealists

Significant artists whose work helped define Photorealism:

- John Baeder (born 1938)
- Robert Bechtle (1932–2020)
- Charles Bell (1935–1995)
- Tom Blackwell (1938–2020)
- Chuck Close (1940–2021)
- Robert Cottingham (born 1935)
- Don Eddy (born 1944)
- Richard Estes (born 1932)
- Audrey Flack (1931–2024)
- Ralph Goings (1928–2016)
- Denis Peterson (born 1944)
- Ian Hornak (1944–2002)
- Howard Kanovitz (1929–2009)
- John Kacere (1920–1999)
- Ron Kleemann (1937–2014)
- Malcolm Morley (1931–2018)
- John Salt (1937–2021)
- Ben Schonzeit (born 1942)

Photorealists

Significant artists whose work meets the criteria of Photorealism:

- Steven Townsend (born 1955)
- Linda Bacon (born 1942)
- Mike Bayne (born 1977)
- Roberto Bernardi (born 1974)
- Arne Besser (1935–2012)
- Anthony Brunelli (born 1968)
- Bryan Charnley (1949–1991)
- Hilo Chen (born 1942)
- Davis Cone (born 1950)
- Randy Dudley (born 1950)
- Martin Gale (born 1949)
- Franz Gertsch (1930–2022)
- Robert Gniewek (born 1951)
- Gus Heinze (born 1926)
- Gottfried Helnwein (born 1948)
- Don Jacot (born 1949)
- David T Kessler (born 1950)
- Noel Mahaffey (born 1944)
- Dennis James Martin (1956–2001)
- Jack Mendenhall (born 1937)
- Kim Mendenhall (born 1949)
- Betrand Meniel (born 1961)
- Reynard Milici (born 1942)
- Marilyn Minter (born 1948)
- Robert Neffson (born 1949)
- William Nichols (born 1942)
- Jerry Ott (born 1947)
- James Torlakson (born 1951)
- Tjalf Sparnaay (born 1954)
- Paul Staiger (born 1941)
- Glennray Tutor (born 1950)
- Rod Penner (born 1965)
- Raphaella Spence (born 1978)
- Idelle Weber (1932–2020)
- Ken Orton (born 1951)
- Roger Winter (born 1934)

Other photorealists

- Clive Head (born 1965)

== See also ==
- Abstract illusionism
- Contemporary art
- Contemporary realism
- History of art
- Hyperrealism (visual arts)
- Photorealistic rendering
- Realism (arts)
- Trompe-l'œil
- Art of Europe
- Western painting

== Bibliography ==
- Auping, Michael; Bishop, Janet; Ray, Charles; and Weinberg, Jonathan (2005), Robert Bechtle: A Retrospective. Berkeley, California: University of California Press. ISBN 978-0-520-24543-3.
- Chalumeau, Jean-Luc (2007), Peinture et Photographie: Pop art, figuration narrative, hyperréalisme, nouveaux pop. Paris: Editions du Chêne. ISBN 978-2-84277-731-9.
- Chase, Linda (1988), Ralph Goings: Essay/Interview. New York: Abrams. ISBN 978-0-8109-1030-0.
- Chase, Linda (ed.) (2001), Photorealism: The Liff Collection. Naples, Florida: Naples Museum of Art. ISBN 978-0-9705158-1-0.
- Geldzahler, Henry and Meisel, Louis K. (1991), Charles Bell: The Complete Works, 1970–1990. New York: Abrams. ISBN 978-0-8109-3114-5.
- Lindey, Christine (1980), Superrealist Painting and Sculpture, New York: William Morrow and Company. ISBN 0688036864
- Meisel, Louis K. (1989), Photorealism. New York: Abradale/Abrams. ISBN 978-0-8109-8092-1.
- Meisel, Louis K. (1993), Photorealism Since 1980. New York: Abrams. ISBN 978-0-8109-3720-8.
- Meisel, Louis K. and Chase, Linda. (2002), Photorealism at the Millennium. New York: Abrams. ISBN 978-0-8109-3483-2.
- Meisel, Louis K. and Harris, Elizabeth K. (2013), Photorealism in the Digital Age. New York: Abrams. ISBN 978-1-4197-0828-2.
- Meisel, Louis K. and Perreault, John (1986), Richard Estes: The Complete Paintings, 1966-1985. New York:Abrams. ISBN 978-0-8109-0881-9.
- Paraskos, Michael (2013), Scarborough Realists Now. London: Orage Press. ISBN 978-0-95658-024-5.
- Paraskos, Michael (2010), Clive Head. London: Lund Humphries. ISBN 978-1-84822-062-1.
- Wilmerding, John (2006), Richard Estes. New York: Rizzoli. ISBN 978-0-8478-2807-4.
