= Ron Kleemann =

American painter (1937–2014)

- Born: Ron Kleemann; July 24, 1937; Bay City, Michigan, USA
- Died: May 30, 2014 (aged 76); Great Barrington, Massachusetts, USA
- Education: B.S. in Design, University of Michigan 1961.
- Known for: Painting
- Movement: Photorealism

Ron Kleemann (July 24, 1937 – May 30, 2014) was an American photorealist painter. Kleemann has been recognized as one of the original artists of the Photorealism movement. His work is usually that of shiny, brightly painted vehicles sometimes focusing on just certain parts.

== Biography ==
Kleemann began to use photographs as aides for his paintings in 1968. These early paintings had subjects such as trucks and cars. Some of the paintings were superimposed with parts of the male and female body. In the early 1970s, Kleemann began to paint extreme close ups of race cars and trucks. This series of paintings made him an icon of Photorealism and solidified his position amongst the original Photorealists.
