= Robert Bechtle =

American painter, printmaker, and educator (1932–2020)

- Born: May 14, 1932; San Francisco, California, U.S.
- Died: September 24, 2020 (aged 88); Berkeley, California, U.S.
- Education: California College of Arts and Crafts
- Occupations: Artist, educator
- Employers: University of California, Berkeley, University of California, Davis, San Francisco State University
- Known for: painting, printmaking
- Notable work: Alameda Gran Torino (1974)
- Movement: Photorealism, Hyperrealism
- Spouses: Nancy Elizabeth Dalton (m. 1963–1982; div.), Whitney Chadwick (m. 1982–2020; death)
- Children: 2

Robert Alan Bechtle (May 14, 1932 – September 24, 2020) was an American painter, printmaker, and educator. He lived nearly all his life in the San Francisco Bay Area and whose art was centered on scenes from everyday local life. His paintings are in a Photorealist style and often depict automobiles.

== Biography ==
Robert Alan Bechtle was born May 14, 1932, in San Francisco, California, to parents Otto Bechtle and Thelma (née Peterson) Bechtle. His mother was a school teacher and his father was an electrician. In early childhood, his family moved to Oakland, and in 1942 he moved to the city of Alameda. Bechtle started drawing at a young age and, with encouragement from his teachers and his family, pursued a future as an artist. He attended Alameda High School.

By submitting a portfolio of artwork to a national "Scholastic Magazine" competition, Bechtle won a scholarship that paid for his first year of college. He received his Bachelor of Fine Arts (1954) and Master of Fine Arts (1958) from the California College of Arts and Crafts (now the California College of the Arts), in Oakland, California.

When he graduated, he was drafted into the United States Army and sent to Berlin, where he painted murals in the Mess Hall and delighted in visiting European museums.

Besides making paintings, watercolors, and drawings, he was an accomplished printmaker. Bechtle began in lithography but, after 1982 when Crown Point Press and Kathan Brown began publishing his prints, worked mainly in etching.

== Teaching ==
From 1965 to 1966, he taught at the University of California, Berkeley; and at the University of California, Davis, from 1967 to 1968. Starting in 1968, he taught at San Francisco State University and lived in San Francisco's Potrero Hill neighborhood.

== Work ==
Robert Bechtle, '61 Pontiac, (1968–1969). oil on canvas, 59 3/4 × 84 1/4 in. (151.8 × 214 cm). Whitney Museum of American Art, New York; © 1969 Robert Bechtle

Alongside artists John Baeder, Richard Estes, Chuck Close, Richard McLean, Ralph Goings, Bechtle was considered to be one of the earliest Photorealists. By the mid-1960s, he had started developing a style and subject matter that he maintained over his career. Working from his own photographs, Bechtle created paintings described as photographic.

Taking inspiration from his local San Francisco Bay Area surroundings, he painted friends and family and the neighborhoods, and street scenes, paying special attention to automobiles. Bechtle's brushwork is barely detectable in his photo-like renditions. His paintings reveal his perspective on how things look to him, the color, and the light of a commonplace scene.

His painting "'61 Pontiac", (made in 1968–1969) feature an image of himself, his first wife Nancy Elizabeth (née Dalton) and their two young children in front of a car.

Peter Schjeldahl wrote in The New Yorker in 2005, when he first noticed a Bechtle painting in 1969, he was "rattled by the middle-class ordinariness of the scene". As he looked more closely, he discovered "a feat of resourceful painterly artifice" that he gradually realized was "beautiful". The article concludes: "Life is incredibly complicated, and the proof is that when you confront any simple, stopped part of it you are stupefied."

== Exhibits and collections ==
Robert Bechtle's work has been exhibited internationally. Museum collections that include his artwork are: the San Francisco Museum of Modern Art (SFMOMA), and the Oakland Museum of California (OMCA) in Northern California; the Museum of Modern Art, Metropolitan Museum of Art, Whitney Museum of American Art, and the Guggenheim Museum in New York City; the Walker Art Center in Minneapolis; and the Smithsonian American Art Museum in Washington, D.C.

=== Retrospective exhibits ===
In 2000, Oakland Museum of California held a retrospective exhibit of Bechtle's paintings, "California Classic: Realist Paintings by Robert Bechtle".

In 2005, a major retrospective exhibit and the first full–scale survey of the artist's work, "Robert Bechtle: A Retrospective", was organized and exhibited by SFMOMA, and travelled to the Modern Art Museum of Fort Worth and at the Corcoran Gallery of Art in Washington, D.C.

== Death ==
Bechtle died of Lewy body dementia while in hospice in Berkeley, California, on September 24, 2020. He was 88 years old, and survived by his wife Whitney Chadwick, and his two children Max and Anne.
