= Stephen Hannock =

American painter (born 1951)

- Born: March 31, 1951 (age 75); Massachusetts, United States
- Education: Hampshire College (1976)
- Style: Painting
- Spouse: Bridget Watkins (died 2004)
- Children: Georgia

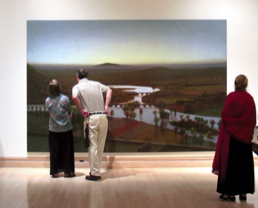
The Oxbow: After Church, after Cole, Flooded (Flooded River for the Matriarchs E. & A. Mongan), Green Light, 2000. Metropolitan Museum of Art.

Stephen W. Hannock (born March 31, 1951) is an American painter known for his atmospheric landscapes––compositions of flooded rivers, nocturnes and large vistas––which often incorporate text inscriptions that relate to family, friends or events of daily life. The artist is known for creating a unique luminosity using a signature technique that involves building up layers of paint on the canvas, sandpaper-polishing it, applying new layers of paint and polishing again. Some of his work is thought to be inspired by the Hudson River School.

== Early life and education ==
It was at Deerfield Academy (where he spent a post-graduate high school year), that Hannock took his first art class since grade school. He later attended Bowdoin College for two years before taking classes at Smith College. In 1976, Hannock earned a degree from Hampshire College based on work done at both Bowdoin and Smith.

While at Smith College, Hannock caught the eye of sculptor and printmaker Leonard Baskin with whom he apprenticed for several years creating anatomical drawings, woodcuts, sculptures and paintings. In an interview, Hannock described his apprenticeship with Baskin:

“I got permission to take a season back from hockey to work privately for Baskin, but I never went back,” Hannock said. “Art just took off and required all my focus. Working with Baskin was the best art school you can imagine, going one on one with a guy who was arguably one of the half dozen great artists of the time."

Taking classes at Smith also put Hannock within the sphere of Elizabeth Mongan, who taught art history at Smith College, and her sister, Agnes Mongan, who was Director at the Fogg Art Museum at Harvard University. Hannock worked with this pair for 25 years; he dedicated his painting The Oxbow of 2000, now at the Metropolitan Museum in New York, to the sisters.

When he left his apprenticeship with Baskin, Hannock found an abandoned factory in Northampton, Massachusetts, to begin a career as an artist.

== Early career (1974–1984) ==
While studying with Leonard Baskin, Hannock began experimenting with phosphorescent paints, creating large scale, imaginary landscapes that glow when placed under black lights. These luminous canvases were an attempt to simulate glowing movie screens and became the basis for the artist's first museum shows at the Smith College Museum of Art (where he was the youngest artist ever to be given a one-man show) and the Fine Arts Center at the University of Massachusetts.

== 1984-2000 ==
In 1984, Hannock moved from Northampton, Massachusetts to New York City where Neo-Expressionism was in full swing and conceptual works which, at first glance, seemed a world apart from the landscapes Hannock was creating. Hannock relied on grants from patron Irene Mennen Hunter––along with odd jobs and occasional work as a fashion model––to pay for studio space and groceries. As Hannock says, "It took me two years before anyone would even look at my slides."

In December, 1988, Newsweek featured an article by writer Cathleen McGuigan entitled, "Transforming the Landscape" in which––along with artists such as April Gornik and Mark Innerst––Hannock was spotlighted as one of the "maverick" landscape painters whose seductive works map "a place that feels at once familiar and strange."

In 1991, restaurant owner Danny Meyer and his partner/chef Tom Colicchio approached Hannock with the idea that he work with architect Peter Bentel on the interior of their New York City project, Gramercy Tavern, which opened in 1994. Their novel idea was that, rather than an afterthought, art could be a fundamental part of the restaurant's design. To date, Hannock has created over a dozen paintings for the team's restaurants, including a huge canvas of the Chelsea Highline at Colicchio and Sons on the Hudson River in New York City.

In 1999 Hannock, along with the rest of the film's technical crew, won an Academy Award for "Special Visual Effects" for the film, What Dreams May Come. Dozens of paintings Hannock began in 1996 were the foundation for the film's "Painted World" scenes.

In 2000, an exhibition of paintings inspired by views of the Oxbow in the Connecticut River, subject of Thomas Cole's The Oxbow (1836), included Hannock's The Oxbow: After Church, After Cole, Flooded, (Flooded River for the Matriarchs, E. & A. Mongan), Green Light (2000) It is held in the permanent collection of the Metropolitan Museum of Art. Also part of the permanent collection at the Metropolitan Museum of Art, is the artist's painting Kaaterskill Falls for Frank Moore and Dan Hodermarsky, acquired in 2007. The painting includes collage elements and written words. In addition, Hannock's work is in such collections as the National Gallery of Art, Washington, D.C.; The Smithsonian American Art Museum, Washington, D.C.; the Whitney Museum of American Art, New York, N.Y.; the Museum of Contemporary Art, San Diego, CA; and the Museum of Fine Arts, Boston, MA.

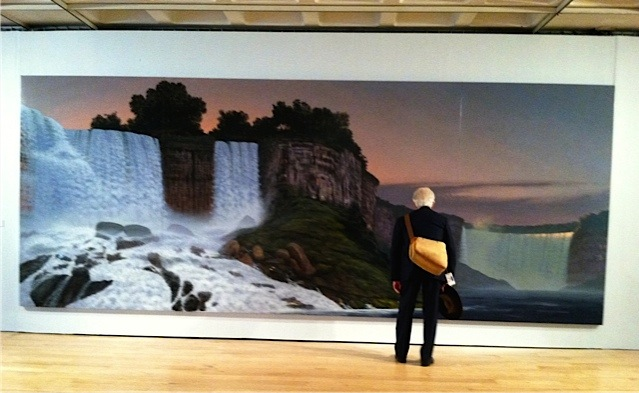
Visitor to Marlborough Gallery in New York City standing in front of Stephen Hannock's "Moving Water for Frank Moore; Niagara Falls" (Mass MoCA #170) 2004-2012, Polished Mixed Media on Canvas, 96 x 240 inches.

== 2000-Present ==
In 2002, the musician Sting commissioned Hannock to make a painting of his home city of Newcastle upon Tyne, England to mark the 2004 grand opening of The Sage Gateshead––a performing arts center designed by Sir Norman Foster. Northern City Renaissance, Newcastle, England, (2008) was completed and unveiled in the Fall of 2009 at the Laing Art Gallery in Newcastle upon Tyne. Newcastle, a former coal and shipbuilding capital that fell into harsh economic times by the 20th century has recently been enjoying a cultural regeneration. In its description of the 8 by 12 feet painting, the Laing describes how Hannock captures both past and present in his multi-layered work:

Hannock depicts a view of the River Tyne as it is today, with The Sage Gateshead, BALTIC Centre for Contemporary Art and the Millennium Bridge. Partially hidden from sight under the layers or paint are images and text relating to the city's mining heritage.

Speaking to Barbara Hodgson of The Journal Hannock shares his belief and hope that his painting tells the story of many cities: “'industrial cities coming back on the wings of culture'” – a comfort, he feels, in view of the current economic climate." By October 17, 2005, Hannock was the subject of a Fortune magazine article entitled, Portrait of an A-List Artist by Andy Serwer. That article includes quotes from a museum director, a curator, and a critic––each with his own view of the artist:

"Because his works are so arresting and immediately accessible, much of the contemporary art world is deeply suspicious of him," says Hugh Davies, director of the Museum of Contemporary Art San Diego. "They think it's too pretty to be profound. It takes time to realize that there is real profundity and depth to his work."

"What is interesting is that Hannock has defied modernism," says Gary Tinterow, Engelhard curator in charge of 19th-century, modern, and contemporary art at the Metropolitan Museum. "He isn't doing abstract painting, or painting according to critical demand. He painted what he wanted to make. The key to Hannock's work is that it is beautiful. Since the fall of modernism as an exclusive ideology, anything goes."

"Are Hannock's paintings too derivative? Too accessible? Certainly a devotee of the avant-garde would say so. And it's true that neither the Museum of Modern Art nor the Whitney, the two pantheons of contemporary art, have Hannock's paintings in their collections. Several prominent art critics contacted by FORTUNE either didn't want to talk about Hannock or hadn't heard of him. When I explained to the critic Robert Hughes that many wealthy collectors own Hannock's work, he responded, "The taste of the American rich is shit.""

Note: In 2007, the Whitney Museum of American Art acquired one of Hannock's works––Maternal Nocturne: Clearing Storm (Mass MoCA #66-C); polished mixed media on envelope over Chuck Close daguerreotype; 2007.

In June, 2009, he was awarded an Honorary Doctor of Fine Arts Degree from Bowdoin College.

In autumn, 2013, Stephen Hannock became the first American artist to be signed by Marlborough Fine Art, London, since Richard Diebenkorn 40 years before. The painter was featured in a solo exhibition there––Stephen Hannock: Moving Water, Fleeting Light––which opened on February 4, 2014 and ran through March 1. Jason Rosenfeld, Ph.D., Distinguished Chair and Professor of Art History at Marymount Manhattan College, New York, curated the show of thirteen paintings and wrote in the accompanying catalogue:

“Hannock’s approach involves an intricate layering of glazes of subtly modulated acrylic or oil across the prepared surfaces, repeatedly honing down the paint using power sanders, veneering the final sanded pigment layer with sheets of reflective resin, and then polishing that down to a matte sheen. This allows light to penetrate deeply into the strata of the picture plane and reemerge with an exceptional radiance."

In 2013, Hannock received the Olana Partnership Frederic E. Church Award along with co-honoree Elizabeth Broun, the Margaret and Terry Stent Director of the Smithsonian American Art Museum. The awards ceremony was held at the New York Public Library on May 23, 2013 with the theme “The Extraordinary American Landscape." The painter’s friend, the musician and art collector Sting presented Hannock’s award to him and a video tribute, featuring comments from Hannock collectors, was also shown. A painting by the artist, Niagara Falls, was among the featured items offered at the Benefit Auction. Stephen Hannock: Olana Tribute Video

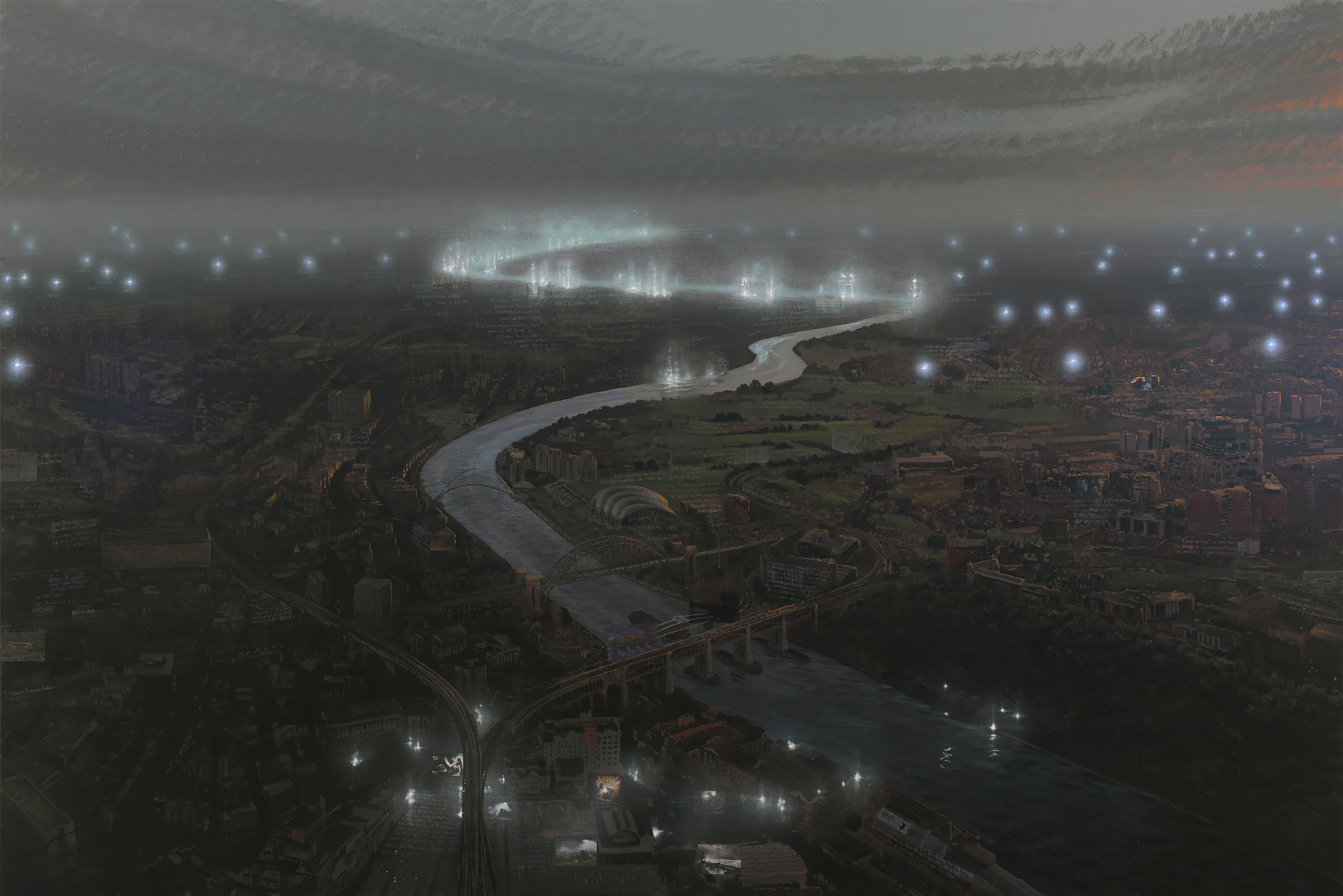
Northern City Renaissance (Mass MoCA #53) 8 x 12 feet, (96 x 144 in.), polished mixed media on canvas, 2008

Hannock’s 8 x 12 foot painting, Northern City Renaissance, Mauve Dawn (Mass MoCA #161), was included in the May 17–September 21, 2014 exhibition Shafts of Light: Mining Art in the Great Northern Coalfield at the Bowes Museum in County Durham in northern England. The painting is the same in size and theme his earlier work, Northern City Renaissance: Newcastle, England (Mass MoCA #79-E), which was commissioned by the musical artist, Sting for the November 2008, opening of the Laing Art Gallery in Newcastle, England.

In 2014, the Yale University Art Gallery acquired Hannock’s 2013 painting The Oxbow for Frank Moore and Dan Hodermarsky (Mass MoCA #196). The polished mixed media on canvas over panel work measures 48 x 72 inches.

Also in 2014, Hannock was invited to curate an exhibition of contemporary art to be held at The Thomas Cole House––home and studio of 19th century American artist Thomas Cole––and Olana, the home of Cole's student, Frederic Edwin Church. The exhibition of 28 artists, open May 3 through November 1, 2015 and entitled Rivercrossings is the first-ever collaboration between these two historic sites of American art. A New York Times review of the show, stated:

“Rivercrossings is the project of the luminist painter Stephen Hannock, whose contemporary style owes much to the Hudson River School’s monumental studio work. Curators often talk about pieces in exhibitions creating 'a visual dialogue' with one another. But this show goes beyond polite discourse. Here the dialogue is like that overheard at a family reunion. In this case, 'family' is two centuries of American art."

In the fall of 2015, Two Ponds Press of Camden, Maine will publish a limited edition book––The Last Ship, from the River of the Northern City––a three-year collaboration between Hannock and his long-time friend, the musician Sting. The book is a compendium of woodcuts by Hannock inspired by the music and lyrics for The Last Ship, the musical by the same name. Both book and musical center on the dying shipbuilding industry in Sting's hometown, Newcastle, a theme that has informed the work of Hannock and Sting for the last several years.

Hannock is among the handful of living artists to be included in The Metropolitan Museum of Art: Masterpiece Paintings, published in 2016. The book provides illustrations and details of 500 art works from the permanent collection of the Metropolitan Museum—works created over the course of 5,000 years in cultures across the globe.

== Personal life ==
Hannock married Bridget Watkins, then PR director and assistant to restaurateur Danny Meyer, in 2000. The couple's daughter, Georgia, was born in June of that same year. Just four years later, in October, 2004, Hannock was widowed when his wife died due to complications stemming from a brain tumor diagnosed while she was pregnant.

== Publications ==
- Stephen Hannock, Recent Paintings: Vistas with Text by Jason Rosenfeld, copyright 2012, Marlborough Gallery, Inc.
- Stephen Hannock by Jason Rosenfeld, Martha Hoppin, Garrett White and with an introduction by Mark C. Taylor.
- Luminosity: The Paintings of Stephen Hannock, preface by S. Lane Faison Jr., introduction by Duncan Christy. Published in 2000 by Chronicle Books.
- Stephen Hannock; Mckenzie Fine Art, Inc. New York; Michel Kohn Gallery; Los Angeles; 2002; essay by Jason Rosenfeld.
- Stephen Hannock, Space & Time; The Dayton Art Institute, 1999; Russell Gallery, Deerfield Academy, 1998; essay by Hal Fischer.
- Master and Apprentice, Selected Works from Leonard Baskin and Stephen Hannock; Hampshire College Library Gallery, 1998; essay by Hosea Baskin.
- Stephen Hannock; James Graham and Sons, New york, 1996; introduction by Hugh M. Davies, catalog essay by Robert Atkins.
- After Church, After Cole: Stephen Hannock's Oxbow; Timken Museum of Art; 1995; essay by Robert Aktins.
