= Audrey Flack =

American artist (1931–2024)

- Flack with her self-portrait
- Born: May 30, 1931; New York City, U.S.
- Died: June 28, 2024 (aged 93); Southampton, New York, U.S.
- Education: New York University Institute of Fine Arts; Yale University; Cooper Union
- Known for: Painting, sculpture
- Movement: Photorealism
- Spouse(s): Frank Levy, Robert Marcus (m. 1970)
- Children: 2
- Website: www.audreyflack.com

Signature
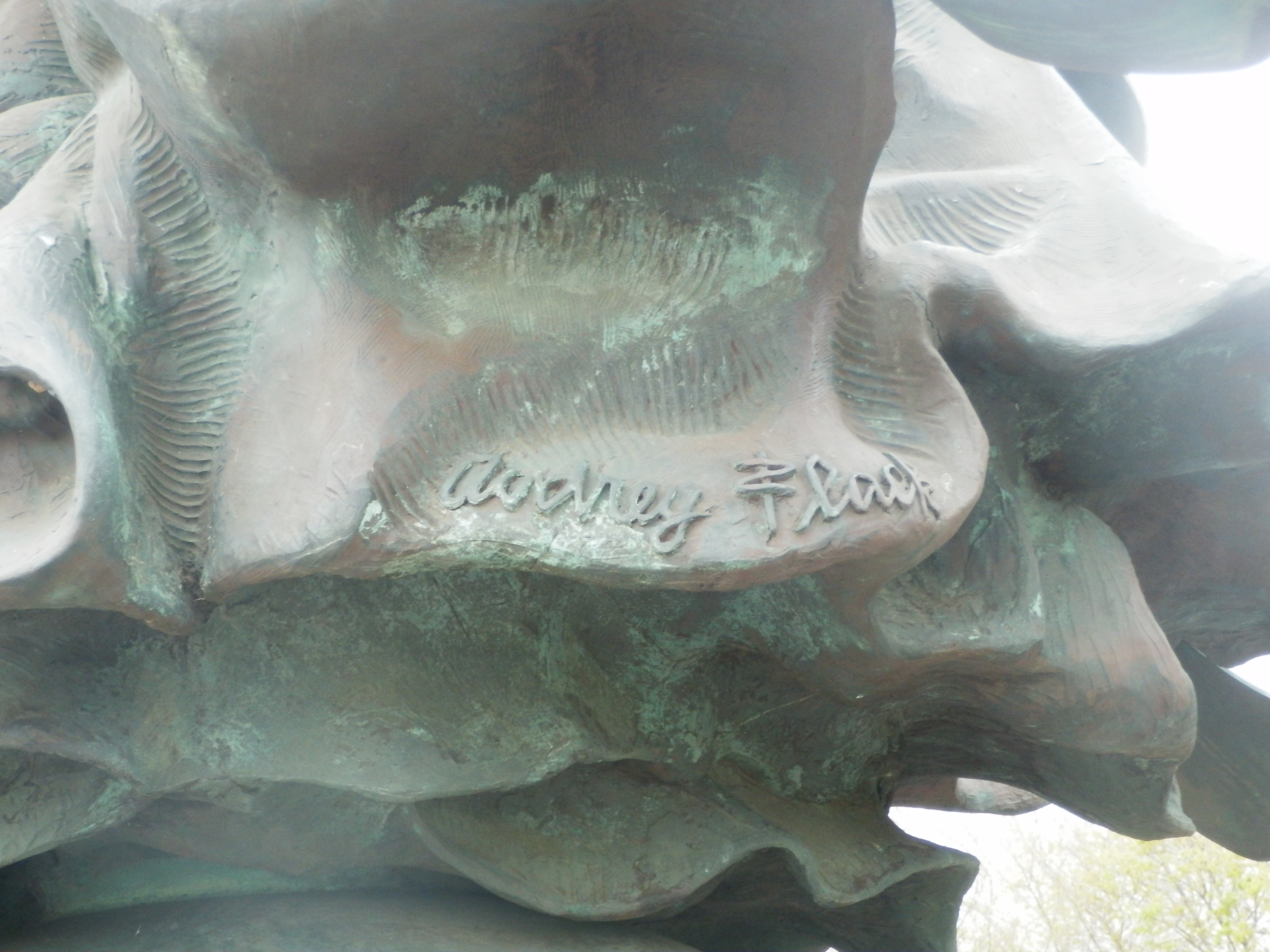

Audrey Lenora Flack (May 30, 1931 – June 28, 2024) was an American visual artist. Her work pioneered the art genre of photorealism and encompasses painting, printmaking, sculpture, and photography.

Flack had numerous academic degrees, including both a graduate and an honorary doctoral degree from Cooper Union in New York City. Additionally she had a bachelor's degree in Fine Arts from Yale University and attended New York University Institute of Fine Arts where she studied art history. In May 2015, Flack received an honorary Doctor of Fine Arts degree from Clark University, where she gave a commencement address.

Flack's work is displayed in several major museums, including the Museum of Modern Art, the Metropolitan Museum of Art, Smithsonian American Art Museum, the Whitney Museum of American Art, and the Solomon R. Guggenheim Museum. Flack's photorealistic paintings were the first such paintings to be purchased for the Museum of Modern Art's permanent collection, and her legacy as a photorealist lives on to influence many American and International artists today. J. B. Speed Art Museum in Louisville, Kentucky, organized a retrospective of her work, and Flack's pioneering efforts into the world of photorealism popularized the genre to the extent that it remains today. Flack was an Honorary Vice President of the National Association of Women Artists.

An accomplished banjo player, Flack was lead vocalist for Audrey Flack and the History of Art Band who released a 2012 album. Flack was one of the first female artists added to Janson's History of Art when the 3rd edition was published in 1986.

== Early life and education ==
Flack was born in Manhattan, to Jeanette Flichtenfeld Flack and Morris Flack, owner of a garment factory. Both parents had immigrated to the US from Poland. Flack attended New York's High School of Music & Art. She attended Cooper Union, then transferred to Yale College in 1952 to study fine arts with Josef Albers among others. She earned a graduate degree and received an honorary doctorate from Cooper Union in New York City and a Bachelor of Fine Arts from Yale University. She studied art history at the Institute of Fine Arts, New York University.

== Career ==
Audrey Flack, Banana Split Sundae, 1981. Minneapolis Institute of Art

Flack's early work in the 1950s was abstract expressionist; one such painting paid tribute to Franz Kline. The ironic kitsch themes in her early work influenced Jeff Koons. But gradually, Flack became a New Realist and then evolved into photorealism during the 1960s. Her move to the photorealist style was in part because she wanted her art to communicate to the viewer. She was the first photorealist painter to be added to the collection of the Museum of Modern Art in 1966. Between 1976 and 1978 she painted her Vanitas series, including the iconic piece Marilyn.

The critic Graham Thompson wrote, "One demonstration of the way photography became assimilated into the art world is the success of photorealist painting in the late 1960s and early 1970s. It is also called super-realism, radical realism, or hyper-realism and painters like Richard Estes, Denis Peterson, Flack, and Chuck Close often worked from photographic stills to create paintings that appeared to be photographs."

Art critic Robert C. Morgan wrote in The Brooklyn Rail about Flack's 2010 exhibition at Gary Snyder Project Space, Audrey Flack Paints a Picture, "She has taken the signs of indulgence, beauty, and excess and transformed them into deeply moving symbols of desire, futility, and emancipation." In the early 1980s Flack's artistic medium shifted from painting to sculpture. She described this shift as a desire for "something solid, real, tangible. Something to hold and to hold on to."

Flack claimed to have found the photorealist movement too restricting, and later gained much of her inspiration from Baroque art.

Her work is held in the collections of museums around the world, including the Metropolitan Museum of Art, The Museum of Modern Art, the Whitney Museum of American Art, the Allen Memorial Art Museum, Smithsonian American Art Museum, and the National Gallery of Australia in Canberra, Australia.

In 1986 Flack published Art & Soul: Notes on Creating, a book expressing some of her thoughts on being an artist.

Her image is included in the iconic 1972 poster Some Living American Women Artists by Mary Beth Edelson.

In 2023 her work was included in the exhibition Action, Gesture, Paint: Women Artists and Global Abstraction 1940-1970 at the Whitechapel Gallery in London.

== Photorealism ==
Flack is best known for her photorealist paintings and was one of the first artists to use photographs as the basis for painting. The genre, taking its cues from Pop Art, incorporates depictions of the real and the regular, from advertisements to cars to cosmetics. Flack's work brings in everyday household items like tubes of lipstick, perfume bottles, Hispanic Madonnas, and fruit. These inanimate objects often disturb or crowd the pictorial space, which are often composed as table-top still lives. Flack often brought in actual accounts of history into her photorealist paintings, such as World War II' (Vanitas) and Kennedy Motorcade. Women were frequently the subject of her photorealist paintings.

The first photorealist painting the MoMA in New York City purchased was Flack's 1974 canvas Leonardo's Lady, soon after it was painted.

== Sculpture ==
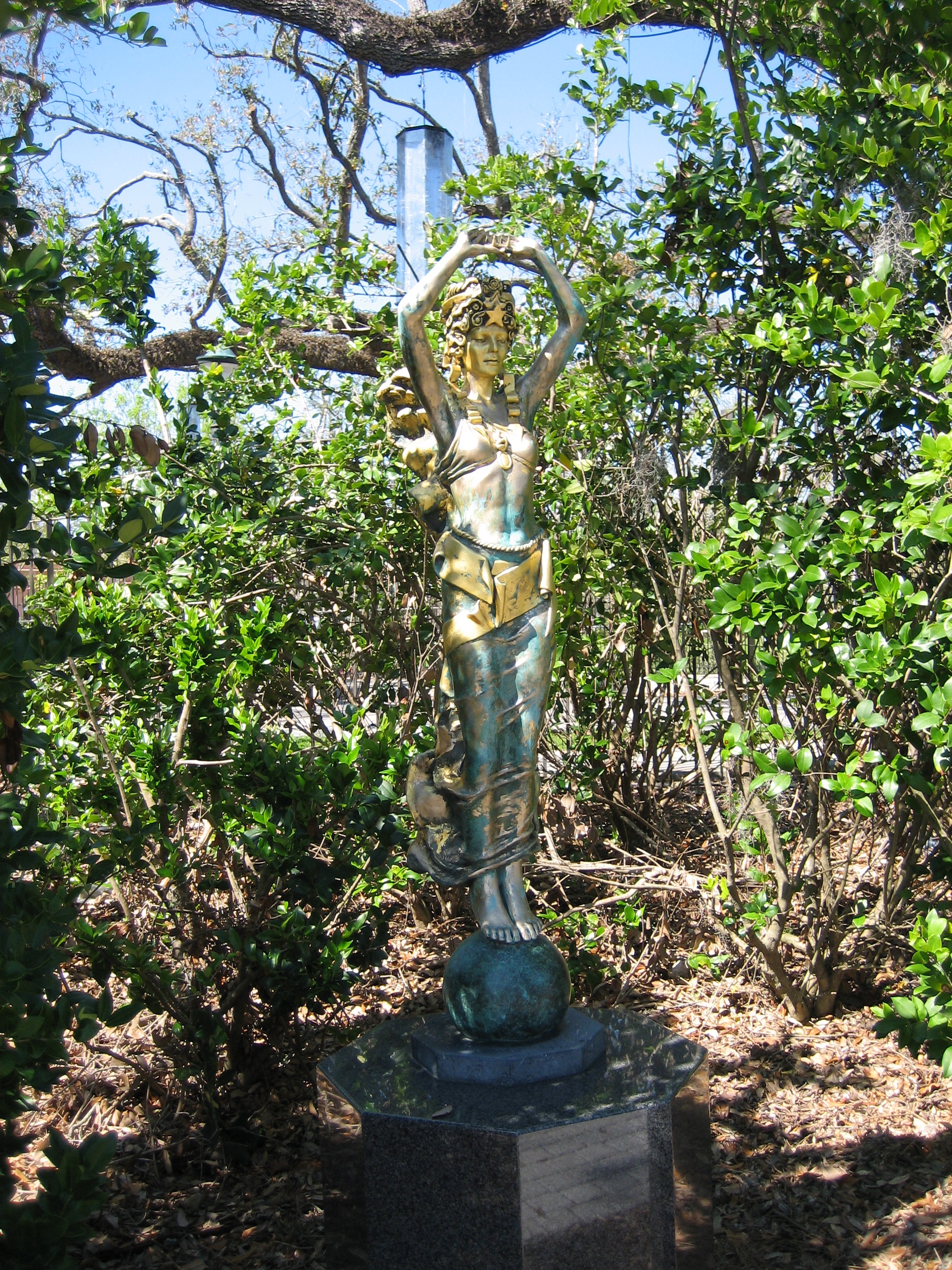
Sculpture by Audrey Flack in New Orleans

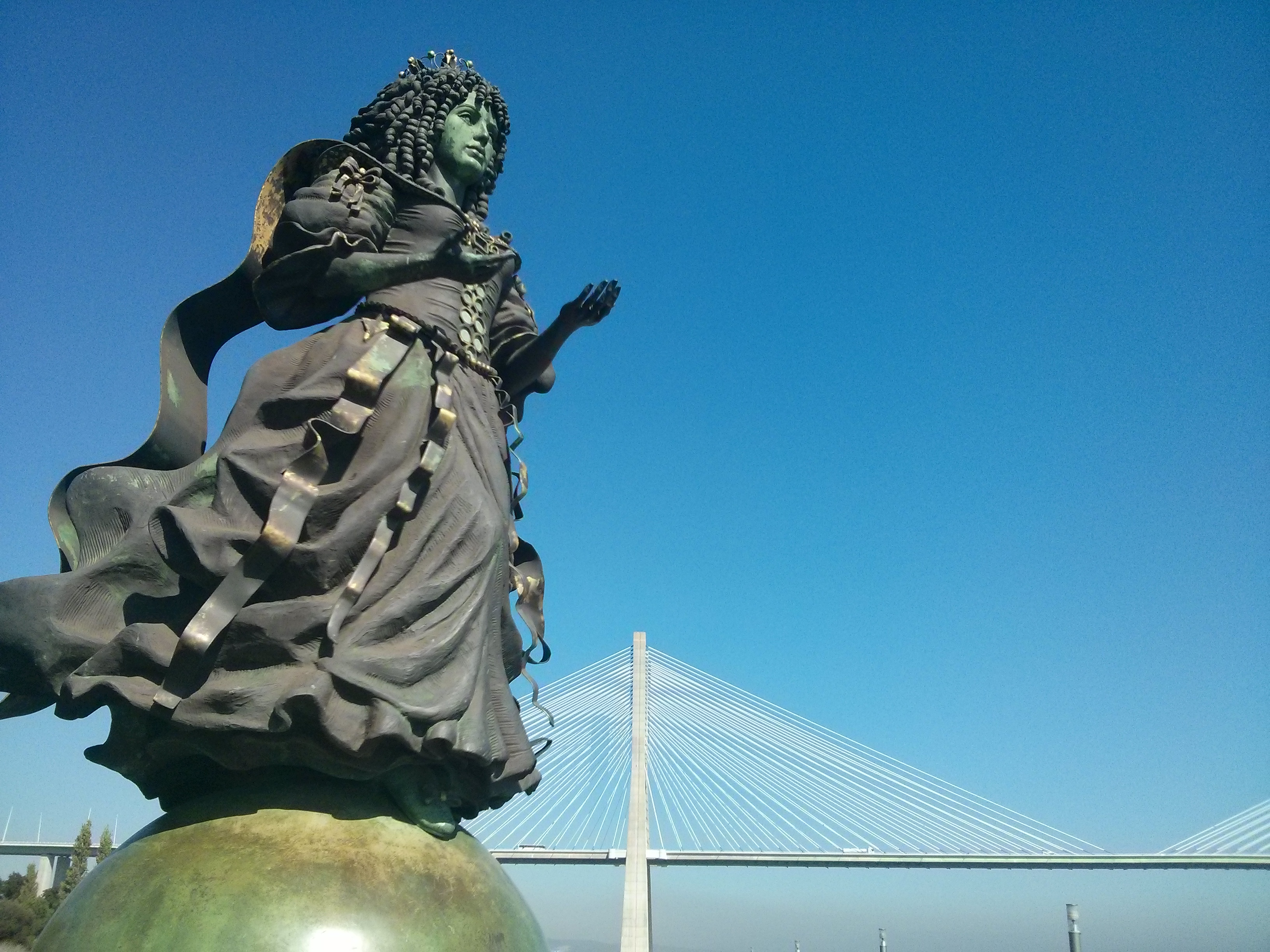
Statue of Catherine of Braganza, in Lisbon, a scale model for a much larger one planned for borough of Queens. New York City, never built

Flack's sculpture is often overlooked in light of her better-known photorealist paintings. In The New Civic Art: An Interview with Audrey Flack, Flack discussed the fact that she was self-taught in sculpture. She incorporated religion and mythology into her sculpture rather than the historical or everyday subjects of her paintings. Her sculptures often demonstrate a connection to the female form, including a series of diverse, heroic women and goddess figures. These depictions of women differ from those of traditional femininity, but rather are athletic, older, and strong. As Flack described them: "they are real yet idealized... the 'goddesses in everywoman.'"

In the early 1990s, Flack was commissioned by a group called Friends of Queen Catherine to create a monumental bronze statue of Catherine of Braganza, in whose honor the borough of Queens is named. The statue, which would have been roughly the height of a nine-story building, was meant to be installed on the East River shore in the Hunters Point area of Long Island City, across from the United Nations Headquarters. The project was never fully realized, however, as protestors in the mid-late 1990s objected to Queen Catherine's ties to the Transatlantic Slave Trade. (Others objected to the statue of a monarch overlooking an American Revolutionary War battleground.) Flack nevertheless remained dedicated to the project, and notes that she endeavored to depict Catherine as biracial, reflecting her Portuguese background and paying homage to the ethnic diversity of the borough of Queens.

== Death ==
Flack died in Southampton, New York on June 28, 2024, at the age of 93. She was preceded in death by her husband, Robert Marcus.

== Publications ==
- Flack, Audrey, With Darkness Comes Stars: Audrey Flack, a Memoir (University Park: PA: Pennsylvania State University Press, 2024).
- Flack, Audrey, Thalia Gouma-Peterson, and Patricia Hills. Breaking the Rules: Audrey Flack, a Retrospective 1950–1990. New York: Harry N. Abrams, 1992. OCLC 24431345.
- Flack, Audrey, Audrey Flack: The Daily Muse (New York: Harry N. Abrams, 1989).
- Flack, Audrey, Art & Soul: Notes on Creating, New York, Dutton, 1986, ISBN 0-525-24443-3
- Flack, Audrey, Audrey Flack: On Painting, with an essay by Ann Sutherland Harris (New York: Harry N. Abrams, 1981).
- Flack, Audrey, "On Carlo Crivelli", Art Magazine 55 (1981): 92–95.
- Flack, Audrey, "The Haunting Images of Louisa Roldan", Helicon Nine: A Journal of Women's Arts and Letters (1979).
- Flack, Audrey, "Louisa Ignacia Roldan", Women's Studies 6 (1978): 23–33.
