= Charles Bell (painter) =

American painter (1935–1995)

- Charles Bell. Circus Act, Silkscreen on Paper, Smithsonian American Art Museum, 1995
- Born: June 11, 1935; Tulsa, Oklahoma, United States
- Died: April 1, 1995 (aged 59); Manhattan, New York City, United States
- Resting place: Diamond Head Memorial Park, Honolulu, Honolulu County, Hawaii, U.S.
- Education: University of Oklahoma

Charles Bell (June 11, 1935 – April 1, 1995) was an American photorealist who created large scale still lifes.

== Artistic career ==
Despite a lifelong interest in art, Bell never received any formal art training. He claimed inspiration from Richard Diebenkorn and Wayne Thiebaud. He also worked in the San Francisco studio of Donald Timothy Flores, where he painted mostly small-scale landscapes and still lifes. He was given the Society of Western Artists Award in 1968. After moving to New York, Bell created his paintings by photographing a subject in still life.

His primary subject matter was vintage toys, pinball machines, gumball machines, and dolls and action figures. By recreating Classical myths like the Judgement of Paris with action figures, Bell sought to bring pictorial majesty and wonder to the mundane. Bell's work, created in his New York loft studio on West Broadway, is noted not only for the glass-like surface of his works, done largely in oil, but also for their significant scale. In 1995 he was included in the exhibition 'American Masters', curated by Michael McKenzie for the Museu d'Arte Moderne in São Paulo, along with Robert Indiana and Andy Warhol, two artists Bell admired. For the exhibit, Bell created a silkscreen print titled "The Viking" largely regarded as a masterpiece of the medium which required 51 plates, 11 proofings and 10 months to produce. Bell was featured in several solo exhibitions at the Louis K. Meisel Gallery in New York and the Hokin/Kaufman Gallery in Chicago.

== Personal life ==
Bell was born and raised in Tulsa, Oklahoma, where he graduated from Will Rogers High School in 1953. He earned a Bachelor of Business Administration degree from the University of Oklahoma in 1957, then served for two years in the U.S. Navy as a lieutenant. Bell lived in the San Francisco Bay Area after leaving the navy, and began his artistic activity in San Francisco. He moved to New York City in 1967 and set up his own studio. Bell worked as an accountant and served as comptroller of the International Nickel Corporation until 1980. Thereafter, he was a full-time artist. He had exhibited his works as early as 1969 at the gallery owned by Louis K. Meisel.

Bell died in Manhattan, New York of lymphoma on April 1, 1995, at age 59. He had AIDS at the time of his death. His partner of 22 years, interior decorator Willard K.H. Ching (1942 – January 14, 1992), had died of an AIDS-related illness three years earlier, in 1992. They are buried alongside each other at Diamond Head Memorial Park, Honolulu, Honolulu County, Hawaii, U.S.

== Legacy ==
After Bell's death, Louis K. Meisel of the Louis K. Meisel Gallery became the owner of all intellectual property rights to the body of art created by Charles Bell.

Bell's works are housed in the collections of the Art Museum of Southeast Texas in Beaumont, Texas, The Metropolitan Museum of Art in New York, The Solomon R. Guggenheim Museum in New York, the Smithsonian American Art Museum in Washington D.C., and the Hiroshima City Museum of Contemporary Art in Japan, among others.

According to art critic and historian, Henry Geldzaler, Bell's best works were in the pinball series. The New York Times quoted Geldzaler as saying, "...the artist's greatest achievement – visually, technically and technologically."

== Books ==
- Henry Geldzahler. Charles Bell: The Complete Works, 1970–1990, 1991 (ISBN 0810931141)
