= Louis K. Meisel =

American author and art dealer

- Born: 1942 (age 83–84); Brooklyn, New York, U.S.
- Occupations: Author, art dealer
- Writing career
- Language: English
- Genres: non-fiction, art
- Subjects: Photorealism
- Website: meiselgallery.com

Louis K. Meisel (born 1942 in Brooklyn, New York) is an American author, art dealer and proponent of the photorealist art movement, having coined the term in 1969. He is the owner of one of the earliest art galleries in SoHo, at 141 Prince Street. Meisel is also an important collector of pin-up art.

== Published works ==
Meisel has authored numerous books on the topic of photorealism and pin-up art, and has contributed to dozens of art magazines. He is a member of the Authors Guild.

- Nathan Wasserberger (1964)
- Richard Estes: The Complete Paintings, 1966–1985 (Abrams, 1986)
- Clarice Cliff:The Bizarre Affair (Abrams, 1998)
- Photorealism (Abradale Press, 1989)
- Charles Bell: The Complete Works 1970-1990 (Abrams, 1991)
- Photorealism Since 1980 (1993)
- The Great American Pin-Up (Taschen,1996)
- Pin-Up Poster Book: The Edward Runci Collection (Collectors Press, 1997)
- Photorealism at the Millennium (Abrams, 2002)
- Mel Ramos Pop Art Fantasies: The Complete Paintings (Watson-Guptill, 2004)
- Gil Elvgren: All His Glamorous American Pin-Ups (Taschen, 2008)
- Photorealism in the Digital Age (Abrams, 2013)

== Music patronage ==
Meisel is the Vice chairman of the board of the Concert Artists Guild. In the early 2010s he initiated the Salon Series at the Parrish Art Museum in Water Mill, New York, which presents around forty classical music concerts per year.
