= John Baeder =

American painter (born 1938)

- Born: 24 December 1938; South Bend, Indiana
- Education: Auburn University, Auburn, Alabama
- Known for: Painting, photography
- Movement: Photorealism

John Baeder (born December 24, 1938) is an American painter closely associated with the photorealist movement. He is best known for his detailed paintings of American roadside diners and eateries.

== Early life ==
John Baeder was born in 1938 in South Bend, Indiana, but was raised in Atlanta, Georgia. His interest in small towns across America began when he was young by photographing old cars and other relics with a Baby Brownie camera. While attending Auburn University in the late 1950s, he made frequent trips between Atlanta and Alabama, which drew his attention to rural landscapes and roadside diners.

== Early years ==
He started working as an art director in Atlanta for a branch of a New York advertising agency in 1960, and subsequently moved to New York City in 1964. He went on to have a successful career in advertising through the early 1970s, while continuing to paint, draw and photograph on his own time.

One of his ad agency offices in New York City was located near the Museum of Modern Art. The museum's photograph department became a source of inspiration for him, especially the work of artists such as Berenice Abbott, Walker Evans, Ben Shahn, and other photographers of the Farm Security Administration. In the late 1960s he also started collecting postcards of roadside America such as diners, gas stations, campsites, and motels.

== Artistic career ==
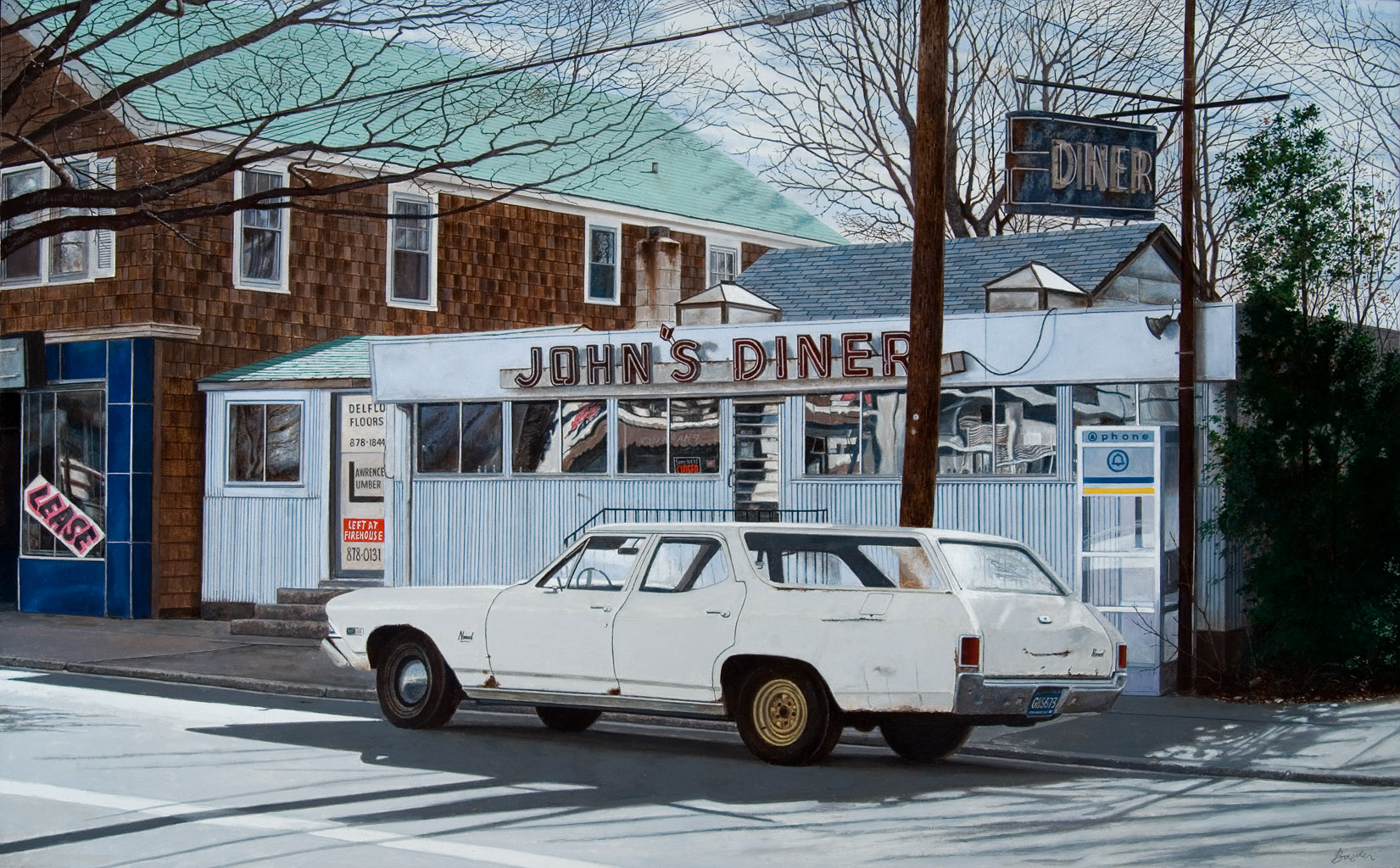
John's Diner with John's Chevelle, 2007 John Baeder, oil on canvas, 30×48 inches

Baeder left the advertising field in 1972 to pursue his artistic career full-time. The same year, OK Harris Gallery in New York began exhibiting his artworks.

Since then, he has had more than thirty solo exhibitions at art galleries such as OK Harris Gallery in New York; Modernism Gallery in San Francisco, Thomas Paul Fine Art in Los Angeles and Cumberland Gallery in Nashville, as well as a traveling retrospective exhibition titled “Pleasant Journeys and Good Eats along The Way,” which started at the Morris Museum of Art in Augusta, Georgia in December 2007.

His work includes oil paintings, watercolors and photographs and can be found in the permanent collections of the Whitney Museum of American Art, the Cooper-Hewitt Museum, the Norton Museum of Art, the Denver Art Museum, the Milwaukee Art Museum, the High Museum of Art, the Detroit Institute of Arts, the Indianapolis Museum of Art, the Cheekwood Museum of Art, the Tennessee State Museum, the Yale University Art Gallery, the Art Museum of Southeast Texas, and the Morris Museum of Art among others.

According to John Arthur, “John Baeder is much more than a painter of diners. He is a knowledgeable and deeply committed chronicler of that rapidly disappearing facet of American vernacular architecture that has played such a unique role in our social and cultural history.” Vincent Scully, professor of the History of Art in Architecture and author, further comments on Baeder's visual style in his introduction to Diners, 1978, stating that his "paintings seem to me to differ from most of those of his brilliant Magic-Realist contemporaries in that they are gentle, lyrical, and deeply in love with their subjects. Most of the painters of the contemporary Pop scene blow our minds with massive disjunctions, explosive changes of scale, and special kind of wink-less visual focus. Baeder does not employ any of those devices. He sees everything as its own size in its proper environment. His diners fit into their urban context like modest folk heroes."

Baeder is the recipient of the Tennessee Governor's Distinguished Artist Award in 2009. He lives and works in Nashville, Tennessee.

== See also ==
- List of Auburn University people

== Sources and further reading ==
=== Books and catalogues ===
- Baeder, John, Diners. With an introduction by Vincent Scully. New York, NY: Harry N. Abrams, 1978.
- Baeder, John, Diners; Revised and Updated. With a foreword by John Arthur and a preface by Vincent Scully. New York, NY: Harry N. Abrams, 1995.
- Baeder, John, Sign Language: Street Signs as Folk Art. New York, NY: Harry N. Abrams, 1996.
- Baeder, John, Gas, Food, and Lodging. New York, NY: Abbeville Press, 1982.
- Frank, Peter, John Baeder’s American Roadside: Early Photographs. Los Angeles, California: Thomas Paul Fine Art, 2009.
- Baeder, John, Jay Williams, ed., Pleasant Journeys And Good Eats Along The Way: A Retrospective Exhibition Of Paintings By John Baeder. With a preface by Kevin Grogan and an introduction by Donald Kuspit. Jackson, Mississippi: University Press of Mississippi, 2007.
- Edwards, Susan H., John Baeder: 1960's Photographs. Self-published, ltd. ed. of 175, 2009.
- Bonito, Virginia Anne, Get Real: Contemporary American Realism from the Seavest Collection. Durham, North Carolina: Duke University Museum of Art, 1998.
- Leeds, Valerie Ann, Ph.D., Introduction to Shock of the Real: Photorealism Revisited. Boca Raton, Florida: Boca Raton Museum of Art, 2008.
- Meisel, Louis K., Photorealism. New York, NY: Harry N. Abrams, 1980.

=== Films ===
- Baeder: Pleasant Journeys and Good Eats Along the Way. Directed by Curt Hahn. 2009, Nashville, Tennessee: Film House. http://www.filmhouse.com/baeder.php

=== Other ===
- Heller, Steven, "Why Does John Baeder Paint Diners?," The Design Observer Group, November 17, 2009, https://web.archive.org/web/20101031071030/http://observatory.designobserver.com/entry.html?entry=11647.
- “Arts Tennessee Winter/Spring 2009 Newsletter,” Tennessee Arts Commission, https://web.archive.org/web/20090407181041/http://www.arts.state.tn.us/artsTN/artstnwinter2009.pdf, 6.
- “John Baeder”, Indianapolis Museum of Art, http://www.imamuseum.org/art/collections/artist/baeder-john
- “John Baeder opening reception”, Tennessee State Museum, https://web.archive.org/web/20110219052035/http://www.tnmuseum.org/Membership/Join%5Fthe%5FFun%21/
- “Past Exhibitions,” Morris Museum of Art, http://www.themorris.org/pastexhibitions.html#2007.
- Nguyen, C. Thi. "Humble Trucks, Great Food," Los Angeles Times, April 21, 2008. p. A1.
- "Roadside America for the 21st Century," Los Angeles Times Sunday Magazine, June 1, 2003. p. 10.
- Reif, Rita. "A Fading Language Of the Roadway," New York Times, June 30, 1996. p. 31, https://www.nytimes.com/1996/06/30/arts/arts-artifacts-a-fading-language-of-the-roadway.html?scp=1&sq=A%20Fading%20Language%20Of%20the%20Roadway&st=cse
- Hudson, Stacey. "On the Road," Metro Spirit (Augusta, Georgia), issue 19.21. December 19–25, 2007, http://www.metrospirit.com/index.php?cat=1993101070593169&ShowArticle_ID=11011812070736572
