= Ralph Goings =

American painter (1928 - 2016)

- Born: May 9, 1928; Corning, California, U.S.
- Died: September 4, 2016 (aged 88); Santa Cruz, California, U.S.
- Education: California College of the Arts and Crafts
- Known for: Painting
- Movement: Photorealism, Hyperrealism

Ralph's Diner (1981–1982), oil on canvas

Ralph Goings (May 9, 1928 – September 4, 2016) was an American painter closely associated with the Photorealism movement of the late 1960s and early 1970s. He was best known for his highly detailed paintings of hamburger stands, pick-up trucks, and California banks, portrayed in a deliberately objective manner.

== Biography ==
=== Early life ===
Goings was born to a working-class family in Corning, California and grew up during the Great Depression. He was exposed to art and painting in a freshman high-school art class, and inspired by his discovery of Rembrandt at his local library. His aunt encouraged him to draw, and bought him books and instructional materials. He began painting using paint from the local hardware store, and old bed sheets when canvas was unavailable.

=== Education ===
After serving in the military, Goings enrolled in Hartnell College, in Salinas, California and was approached and encouraged to attend art school by Leon Amyx, who was the head of the art department at Hartnell at that time and a well-known painter. Goings studied art at the California College of Arts and Crafts in Oakland. During his studies at California College of the Arts, he studied along other painters from the Photorealist Movement including Robert Bechtle and Richard Mclean, as well as other artists including Nathan Oliveira. He received his MFA in painting from Sacramento State College in 1965.

He was inspired by artists such as Wayne Thiebaud, Johannes Vermeer, and Thomas Eakins. His interest in Photorealism sparked after being thoroughly disappointed with the quality of the pop art imagery at the time; he felt that if something was to represent an object then it should resemble a photograph as closely as possible.

=== Work ===
Goings helped to define the Photorealist Movement along with Robert Bechtle, Robert Cottingham, Audrey Flack, Don Eddy, and Richard Estes.

"In 1963 I wanted to start painting again but I decided I wasn't going to do abstract pictures". It occurred to me that I should go as far to the opposite as I could. ... It occurred to me that projecting and tracing the photograph instead of copying it freehand would be even more shocking. To copy a photograph literally was considered a bad thing to do. It went against all of my art school training... some people were upset by what I was doing and said 'it's not art, it can't possibly be art'. That gave me encouragement in a perverse way, because I was delighted to be doing something that was really upsetting people... I was having a hell of a lot of fun..." (edited quote from Realists at Work)

== Art market ==
The best selling painting by the artist was Still Life with Peppers (1981), who sold by $698,500 at Christie's, on 12 May 2010.
