= Robert Cottingham =

American artist

- Born: Robert Cottingham; September 26, 1935 (age 90); Brooklyn, New York, U.S.
- Education: B.F.A., Pratt Institute, New York
- Known for: Painting
- Patrons: Louis K. Meisel

Robert Cottingham (born 26 September 1935 in Brooklyn, New York) is an American artist known for his paintings and prints of urban American landscapes, showing building facades, neon signs, movie marquees, railroad heralds, and shop fronts.

Cottingham is usually classified as a photorealist. He characterizes his paintings as belonging to a tradition of American vernacular scenes painted by Stuart Davis, Charles Demuth, Edward Hopper, and Charles Sheeler. Cottingham was influenced by his background in advertising and typography, and consequently connects his work to Pop art.

Cottingham turned to painting full-time after his first successful solo exhibitions in 1968. He began showing at the OK Harris Gallery in New York in 1971. In 1974, he was awarded a grant by the National Endowment for the Arts. Cottingham is a two-time recipient of fellowships from MacDowell.

In 1990, he was elected into the National Academy of Design as an Associate Academician, and became a full Academician in 1994. A retrospective of Cottingham's prints took place at the Smithsonian American Art Museum in 1999.

== Selected collections ==
- Solomon R. Guggenheim Museum
- Smithsonian American Art Museum
- Whitney Museum
- National Gallery of Art
- Museum of Modern Art
- Art Institute of Chicago
- Madison Museum of Contemporary Art
- Buffalo AKG Art Museum
- Yale University Art Gallery
