= Richard Estes =

American artist (born 1932)

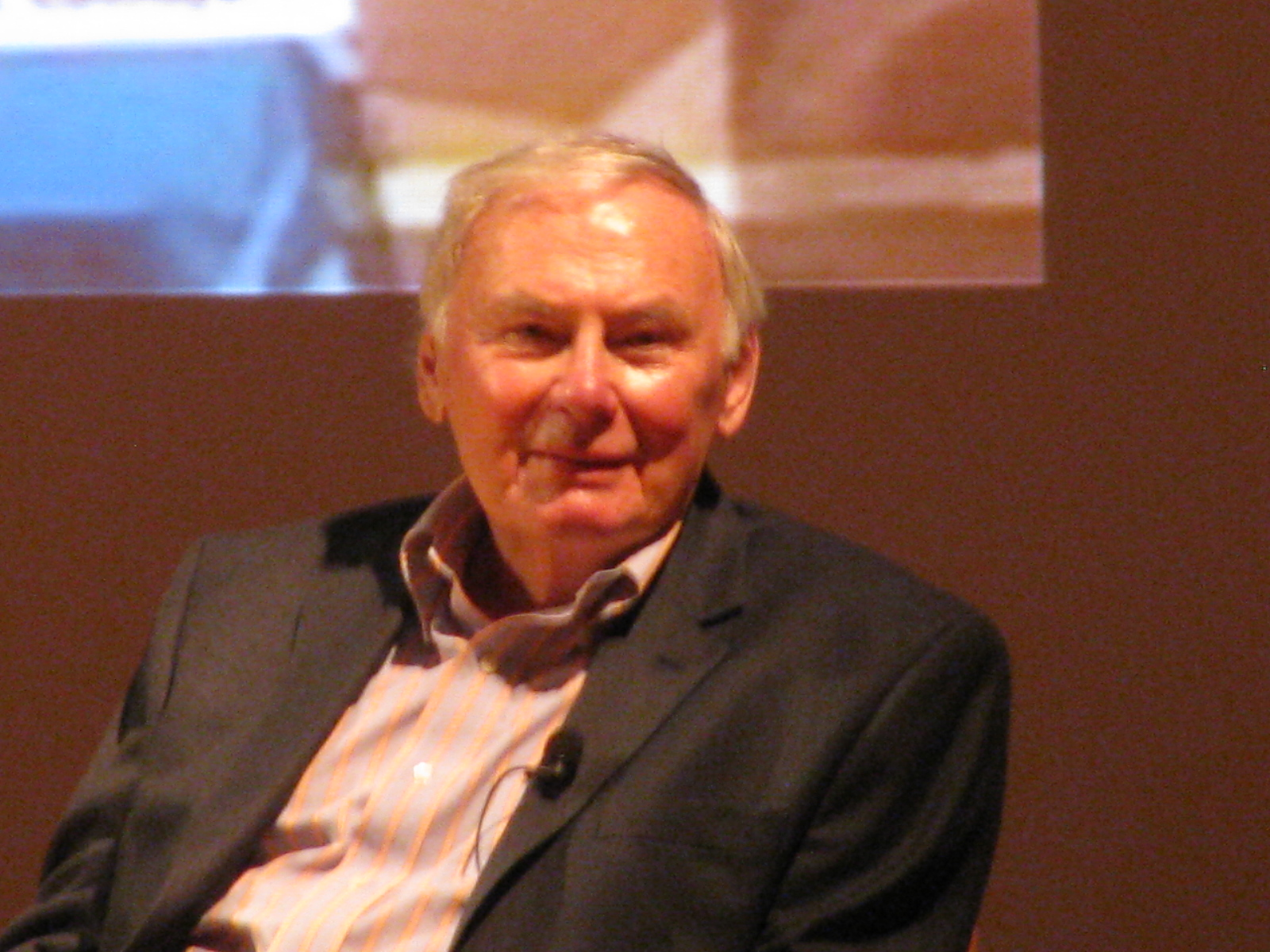
- Richard Estes at the Smithsonian American Art Museum, 2014
- Born: May 14, 1932 (age 94); Kewanee, Illinois
- Education: Art Institute of Chicago
- Known for: Painting
- Notable work: Telephone Booths
- Movement: Photorealism

Richard Estes (born May 14, 1932) is an American artist, best known for his photorealist paintings. The paintings generally consist of reflective, clean, and inanimate city and geometric landscapes. He is regarded as one of the founders of the international photo-realist movement of the late 1960s, with such painters as John Baeder, Chuck Close, Robert Cottingham, Audrey Flack, Ralph Goings, and Duane Hanson. Author Graham Thompson writes "One demonstration of the way photography became assimilated into the art world is the success of photorealist painting in the late 1960s and early 1970s. It is also called super-realism or hyper-realism and painters like Richard Estes, Denis Peterson, Audrey Flack, and Chuck Close often worked from photographic stills to create paintings that appeared to be photographs."

== Early life ==
At an early age, Estes moved to Chicago with his family, where he studied fine arts at The School of the Art Institute of Chicago (1952–56). He frequently studied the works of realist painters such as Edgar Degas, Edward Hopper, and Thomas Eakins, who are strongly represented in the Art Institute's collection. After he completed his course of studies, Estes moved to New York City and, for the next ten years, worked as a graphic artist for various magazine publishers and advertising agencies in New York and Spain. During this period, he painted in his spare time. He had lived in Spain since 1962 and, by 1966, was financially able to paint full-time. He is openly gay. The Toledo Museum of Art website states about when he moved to New York: "Part of the city’s appeal to Estes as a young gay man was the relative freedom it offered, allowing him to visit gay bars and afford his own apartment."

== Work ==
Estes stayed true to the photographs he used: when his paintings include stickers, signs, and window displays, they are always depicted backwards because of the reflection. His work rarely included litter or snow around the buildings because he believed these details detract from the buildings themselves. The paintings are always in daylight, suggesting "vacant and quiet Sunday mornings." Estes' works strive to create convincing three-dimensionality on a two-dimensional canvas. His work has been described in terms ranging from super-realism, sharp-focus realism, neo-realism, photo-realism, to radical realism. The most common one is super-realism. Estes' paintings from the early 1960s are typically of city dwellers engaged in everyday activities. Around 1967, he began to paint storefronts and buildings with glass windows and their reflected images. The paintings were based on Estes' color photographs, which captured the evanescence of the reflections, changing with the lighting and the time of day.

Telephone Booths (1968), Oil on canvas. Museo Thyssen-Bornemisza, Madrid

Estes paintings were based on multiple photographs of the subject. He avoided famous New York landmarks. His paintings provided fine details that were invisible to the naked eye, and gave "depth and intensity of vision that only artistic transformation can achieve." While some alteration was done for the sake of aesthetic composition, it was important to Estes that the central and the main reflected objects be recognizable, and that the evanescent quality of the reflections be preserved. He had a one-man show in 1968 at the Allan Stone Gallery. His works have been exhibited at the Metropolitan Museum of Art, the Whitney Museum, the Thyssen-Bornemisza Museum, and the Solomon R. Guggenheim Museum. In 1971, Estes was granted a National Council for the Arts fellowship. The same year, he was elected into the National Academy of Design as an Associate member, and he became a full Academician in 1984.

He was the subject of the documentary Actually Iconic: Richard Estes (2019), directed by Olympia Stone.

== Art market ==
The highest price reached by one of his paintings in the art market was when Gifts of Nature (1978) sold by $1,284,000 at Christie's, on 10 March 2023.

== Public collections ==
Estes is represented in several leading public collections, including the Metropolitan Museum of Art, in New York, the Museum of Modern Art, in New York, the Solomon R. Guggenheim Museum, in New York, the Whitney Museum of American Art, in New York, the National Gallery of Art, in Washington, D.C., the Smithsonian American Art Museum, in Washington, D.C., The Art Institute of Chicago, the Cleveland Museum of Art, the Detroit Institute of Arts, the High Museum of Art, in Atlanta, the Ludwig Museum of Contemporary Art, in Budapest, the Centre national des arts plastiques, in Paris, the Museo Botero, in Bogotá, the Tate collections, in England, and the Thyssen-Bornemisza Museum, in Madrid.
