= Hyperrealism (visual arts) =

Genre of painting and sculpture

Hyperrealism is a genre of painting and of sculpture that developed in the United States and Europe from the early 1970s, often described as an outgrowth of photorealism. The term comes from the French hyperréalisme, already in use by 1971, when the Paris Biennale included a section under that name. It appeared again as the title of a 1973 exhibition at the dealer Isy Brachot's gallery in Brussels. That show included American photorealist painters, and the name was later applied more broadly to highly detailed work in both mediums.

In painting, hyperrealism is built from a recorded image. Artists work from stills, and later from digital images, to produce pictures whose detail, texture, and lighting can appear clearer than the source itself. Unlike earlier photorealism, which often imitated that source as faithfully as possible and left out narrative or emotion, hyperrealist painting typically uses it as a reference in order to heighten those qualities, and often includes narrative, emotive, or social content.

In sculpture, the aim is to present a human figure as if it were real. Works in this vein are often molded, then cast, and finished with materials such as silicone, resin, fiberglass, paint, real hair, and clothing, so that skin, veins, pores, and blemishes hold up at close range. The figure occupies real space, at life size or at a scale that has been enlarged or reduced, and is encountered as a body rather than as a picture. The point is not technical duplication alone; the work often carries narrative, emotion, or social content.

== History ==
By the late 1960s a closely related realist tendency had already taken hold in American painting, usually under the names photorealism or super-realism. Early exhibitions were staged under various titles, including Realism Now at Vassar College in 1968 and Sharp-Focus Realism at the Sidney Janis Gallery in 1972. In 1972, documenta 5 in Kassel included a section of sharply realist work, among them paintings by Richard Estes, Chuck Close, Robert Bechtle, and Ralph Goings, and sculpture by Duane Hanson.

The French term was already current before it was used as an exhibition title in Brussels. At the 7th Paris Biennale, held at Vincennes in September and October 1971, a section of the show was labeled Hyperréalisme. In February 1973, Jean-François Lyotard published "Esquisse d'une économique de l'hyperréalisme" in the magazine L'Art Vivant. Later that year, from 14 December 1973, Brachot presented Hyperréalisme: maîtres américains et européens at his Brussels gallery, with a catalogue by Karel Geirlandt and Jean-Pierre Van Tieghem. The exhibition included both paintings and sculptures. In February 1974 the Centre national d'art contemporain in Paris followed with Hyperréalistes américains, réalistes européens.

The name did not settle evenly. In France, hyperréalisme became the usual term for this highly illusionistic realism, much of it based on photography; in English the same work has often been discussed as photorealism or super-realism, and later writers have sometimes reserved "hyperrealism" for a subsequent generation. The terms overlap, and sources do not always distinguish them cleanly.

== Painting ==
Charles Bell, Circus Act, silkscreen on paper, Smithsonian American Art Museum, 1995

Hyperrealist painting starts from a recorded image rather than from direct observation alone. Painters have typically worked from photographs, which they may enlarge, project, or transfer by gridding, and have often used the airbrush as well as oils or acrylics, in pursuit of a smooth, highly finished surface. Meisel's later criteria for photorealism stressed the camera as a source of information, a mechanical or semi-mechanical transfer to the canvas, and a finished work that appears photographic.

Some critics treat hyperrealism in painting as essentially the French name for photorealism, or as synonymous with it. Others describe it as an outgrowth of that practice: where earlier photorealists often imitated the photograph as faithfully as possible and played down narrative or emotion, later painters have used the photograph as a reference in order to heighten detail, texture, and light, and have more often introduced narrative, emotive, or social content. As digital cameras and image software became common, some artists also worked from high-resolution digital files, sometimes pushing clarity and surface beyond what the source itself made obvious.

Painters associated with the first wave, in the late 1960s and 1970s, include Close, Estes, Goings, Bechtle, and Audrey Flack. European artists discussed in the same context include Franz Gertsch.

== Sculpture ==
In sculpture the aim is not to resemble a photograph but to present a human figure as if it were real, occupying the same space as the viewer. The core early work was made in the United States in the late 1960s and early 1970s, above all by Hanson and De Andrea. Hanson was included in documenta 5 in 1972.

=== Material fidelity and environmental realism ===
Duane Hanson, Woman Eating, polyester resin and fiberglass with oil and acrylic paints and found accessories, Smithsonian American Art Museum, 1971

De Andrea and Hanson established the basic method: figures were molded from live models, then cast in materials such as polyester resin, fiberglass, or bronze, and finished so that they could be taken, at first glance, for living people. De Andrea has worked mainly from the unclothed body, finishing the surface with paint and hair so that skin, creases, and imperfections hold up at close range. Hanson used the same casting process, then dressed the figures in ordinary clothes and staged them with everyday objects, including found accessories, presenting ordinary people in everyday situations. In his work the illusion depends not only on the painted surface but on clothing, posture, and familiar setting. Viewers have repeatedly mistaken the figures, at first glance, for living persons.

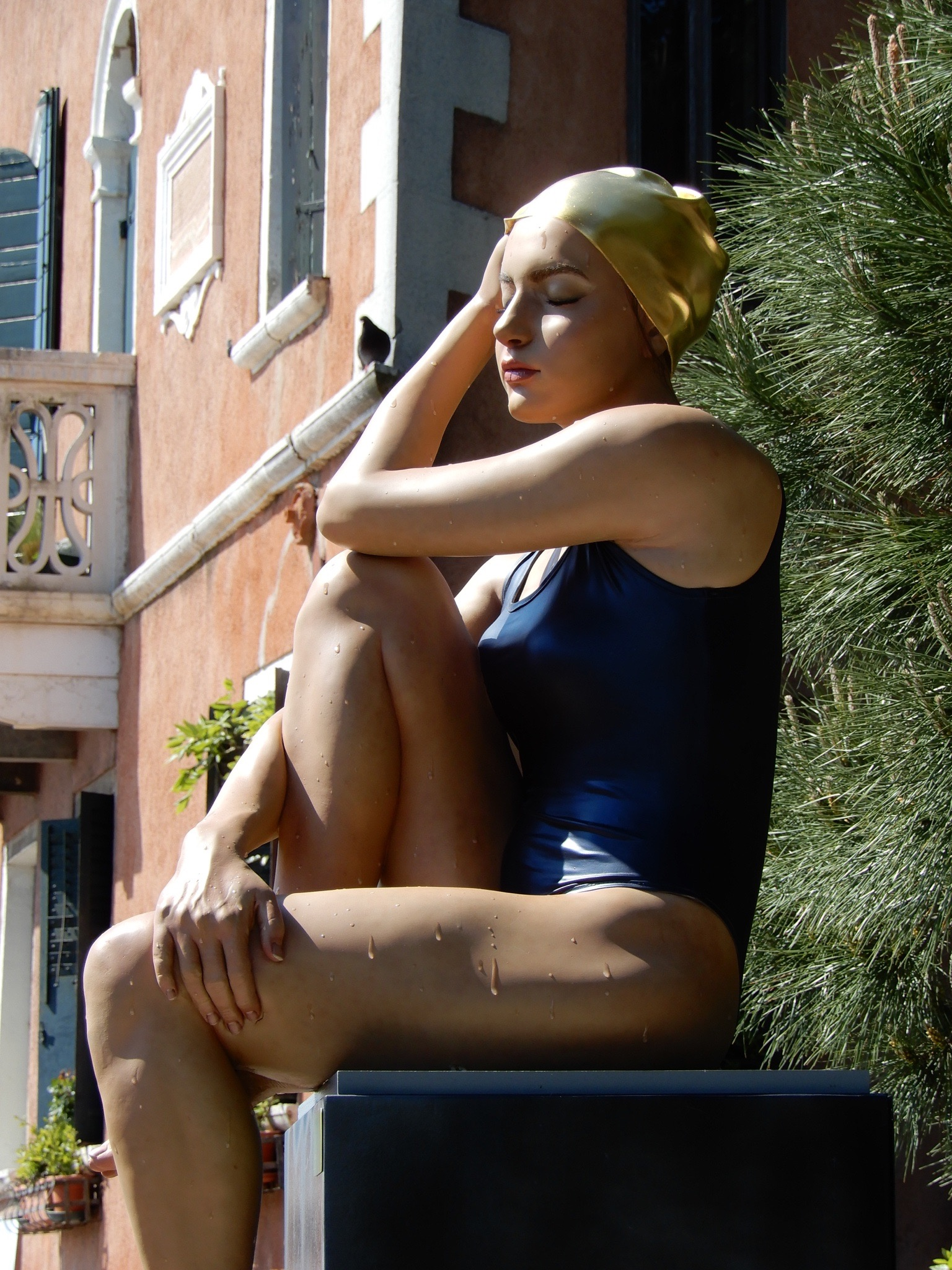
Carole Feuerman, The Midpoint, oil on resin, 2017

Later artists continued that close finish of the unclothed body; Carole Feuerman is known for figures of swimmers and divers, painted in fine surface detail.

=== Distortions of scale and form ===
From the 1990s, some sculptors kept a close anatomical finish but changed the scale of the figure. Ron Mueck became known for figures that are markedly larger or smaller than life; the change of scale is a fundamental part of the work. Sam Jinks and Marc Sijan have likewise made figures smaller than life, using materials such as silicone, resin, fiberglass, and hair. Evan Penny has used silicone to elongate, flatten, or otherwise distort the figure, drawing on effects associated with photography and with digital image manipulation.

The lifelike figure has also been used for conceptual and narrative ends. From the mid-1990s the French artist Gilles Barbier has made wax casts of his own body and staged them in installations. In L'Ivrogne (The Drunkard, 1999–2000), a wax figure of the artist kneels beneath a spiral of objects that appears to issue from his head. In L'Hospice (The Nursing Home, 2002), life-size wax figures present comic-book superheroes as elderly residents of a care home, among them Superman on a walker and Catwoman in front of a television.

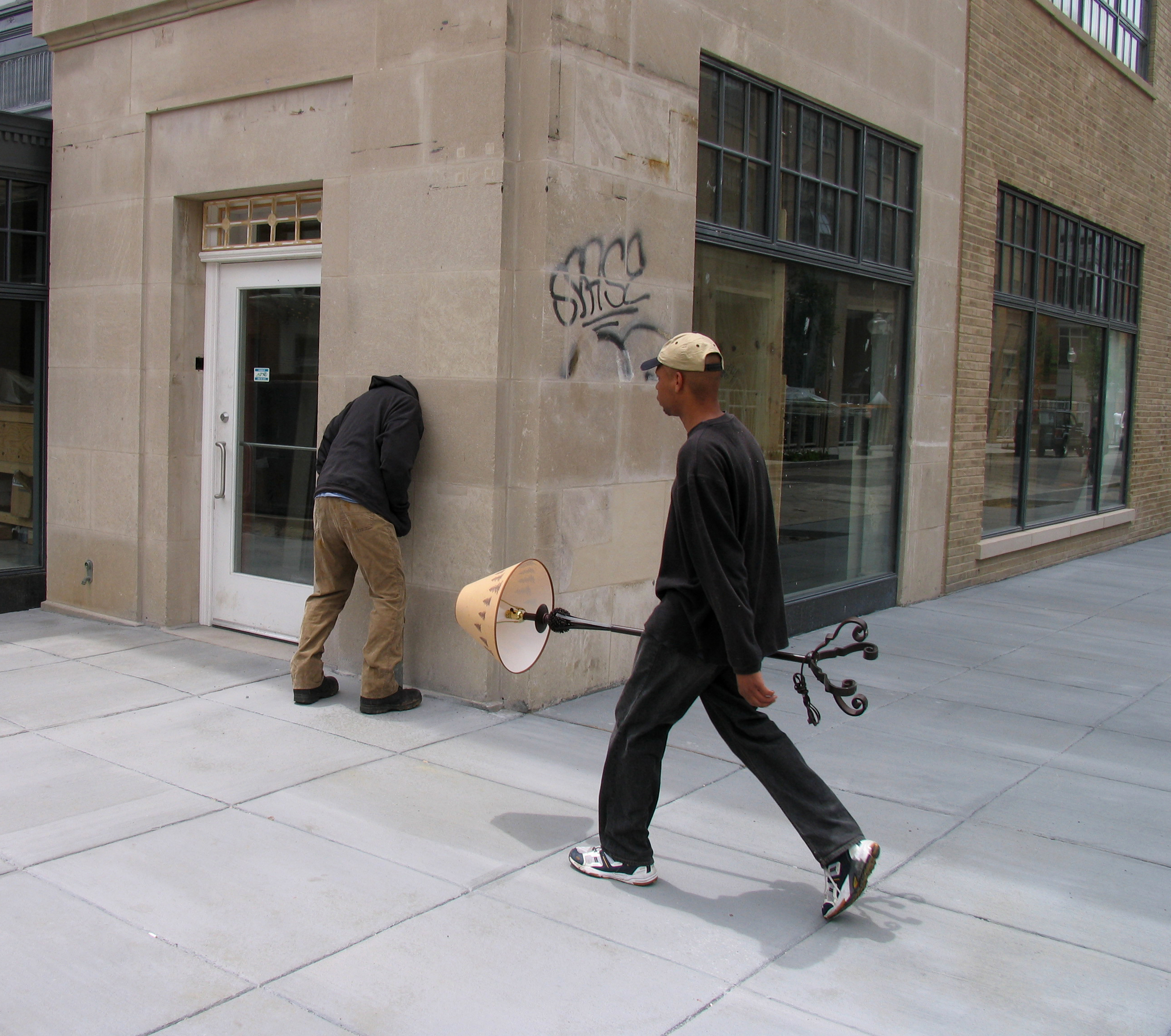
Mark Jenkins, Embed Series #1, tape, wood, cement, and clothes, Washington, D.C., 2006

A later use of the clothed figure placed the work outside the gallery. Since 2003 the American artist Mark Jenkins, who has been credited with pioneering packing-tape sculpture, has installed life-size figures in public streets. Passersby have taken them for living people and have called the police or ambulance services.

== Hyperrealist artists ==
- Alison Van Pelt
- Andreas Orosz
- Antonio López
- Anthony Brunelli
- Arinze Stanley Egbengwu
- Audrey Flack
- Augusto Ferrer-Dalmau
- Ben Johnson
- Ben Schonzeit
- Bert Monroy
- Bertrand Meniel
- CJ Hendry
- Carole Feuerman
- Charles Bell
- Chuck Close
- Claudio Bravo
- Clive Head
- David Kassan
- David Lynch
- David Parrish
- Davis Cone
- Denis Peterson
- Dennis Wojtkiewicz
- Dimitri Desiron
- Don Eddy
- Don Jacot
- Dragan Malesevic Tapi
- Duane Hanson
- Eric Dillman
- Eric Zener
- Fola David
- Franz Gertsch
- Frederic Gracia
- Gilles Paul Esnault
- Glennray Tutor
- Gottfried Helnwein
- Gus Heinze
- Hilo Chen
- Howard Kanovitz
- Hynek Martinec
- Ian Hornak
- István Sándorfi
- Jack Mendenhall
- Javier Arizabalo
- Jerry Ott
- John Baeder
- John De Andrea
- John Kacere
- John Salt
- Jorge Melicio
- Joseph Canger
- José Ramón Muro
- Juan Francisco Casas
- Juan Gonzalez
- Kamalky Laureano
- Kelvin Okafor
- Ken Nwadiogbu
- León Orozco
- Leng Jun
- Lorena Kloosterboer
- Malcolm Morley
- Marilyn Minter
- Mark Jenkins
- Maurizio Cattelan
- Michal Ožibko
- Noah Creshevsky
- Oresegun Olumide
- Oscar Ukonu
- Otto Duecker
- Patricia Piccinini
- Patrick Chuka
- Paul John Wonner
- Paul Thek
- Peter Anton
- Peter Maier
- Ralph Goings
- Randy Dudley
- Raphaella Spence
- Richard Estes
- Richard McLean
- Robert Bechtle
- Robert Cottingham
- Robert Gniewek
- Robert Neffson
- Roberto Bernardi
- Robin Eley
- Rod Penner
- Ron Kleemann
- Ron Mueck
- Rudolf Häsler
- Sebastian Krüger
- Taner Ceylan
- Terry Rodgers
- The Kid
- Tom Blackwell
- Tjalf Sparnaay
- Willem van Veldhuizen
- Yigal Ozeri
- Zharko Basheski

== See also ==
- Photorealism
