= Heydar Aliyev Center =

Building complex in Baku, Azerbaijan

- Heydər Əliyev Mərkəzi
- The Heydar Aliyev Center in 2012
- Interactive map of the Heydar Aliyev Center area

General information
- Status: Completed
- Architectural style: Neo-futurism
- Location: Baku, Azerbaijan
- Coordinates: 40°23′43″N 49°52′01″E
- Construction started: 2007
- Completed: 10 May 2012
- Cost: US$250 million (estimated)

Height
- Roof: 74 m (243 ft)

Design and construction
- Architect: Zaha Hadid Architects
- Main contractor: DIA Holding

The Heydar Aliyev Center (Azerbaijani: Heydər Əliyev Mərkəzi) is a 57,500 m^{2} (619,000 sq ft) building complex in Baku, Azerbaijan, designed by Zaha Hadid and noted for its distinctive architecture and flowing, curved style that eschews sharp angles. The main contractor, Dia Holdings, is owned by actors that are linked to Azerbaijan's ruling Aliyev family's network of offshore companies.

The center is named after Heydar Aliyev (1923–2003), the first secretary of Soviet Azerbaijan from 1969 to 1982, and president of Azerbaijan Republic from October 1993 to October 2003.

== Design ==
Exterior

In 2007, Zaha Hadid was appointed as the design architect of the Center after a competition. The Center houses a conference hall (auditorium), a gallery hall and a museum. The project is intended to play an integral role in the intellectual life of the city. Located close to the city center, the site plays a pivotal role in the redevelopment of Baku.

The Heydar Aliyev Center represents a fluid form which emerges by the folding of the landscape's natural topography and by the wrapping of individual functions of the Center. All functions of the Center, together with entrances, are represented by folds in a single continuous surface.

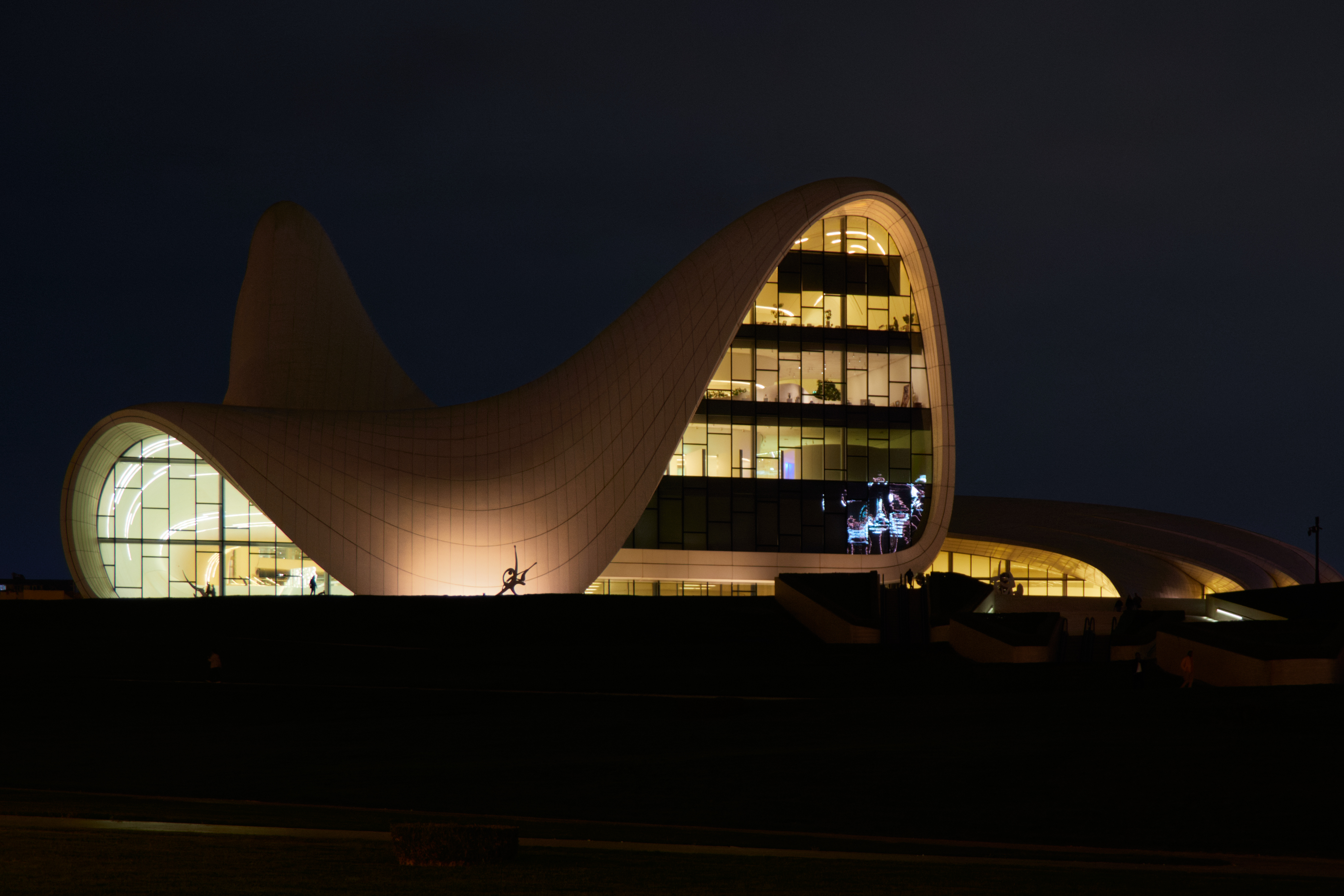
The Heydar Aliyev Center illuminated at night.

The Heydar Aliyev Center had an official soft-opening ceremony on 10 May 2012 held by the president of Azerbaijan Ilham Aliyev.

Extending on eight floor levels, the center accommodates a 1,000-seat auditorium, temporary exhibition spaces, a conference center, workshops, and a museum.

The building was nominated for awards in 2013 at both the World Architecture Festival and the biennial Inside Festival. In 2014, the Center won the Design Museum's Design of the Year Award 2014 despite concerns about the site's human rights record. This makes Hadid the first woman to win in that competition.

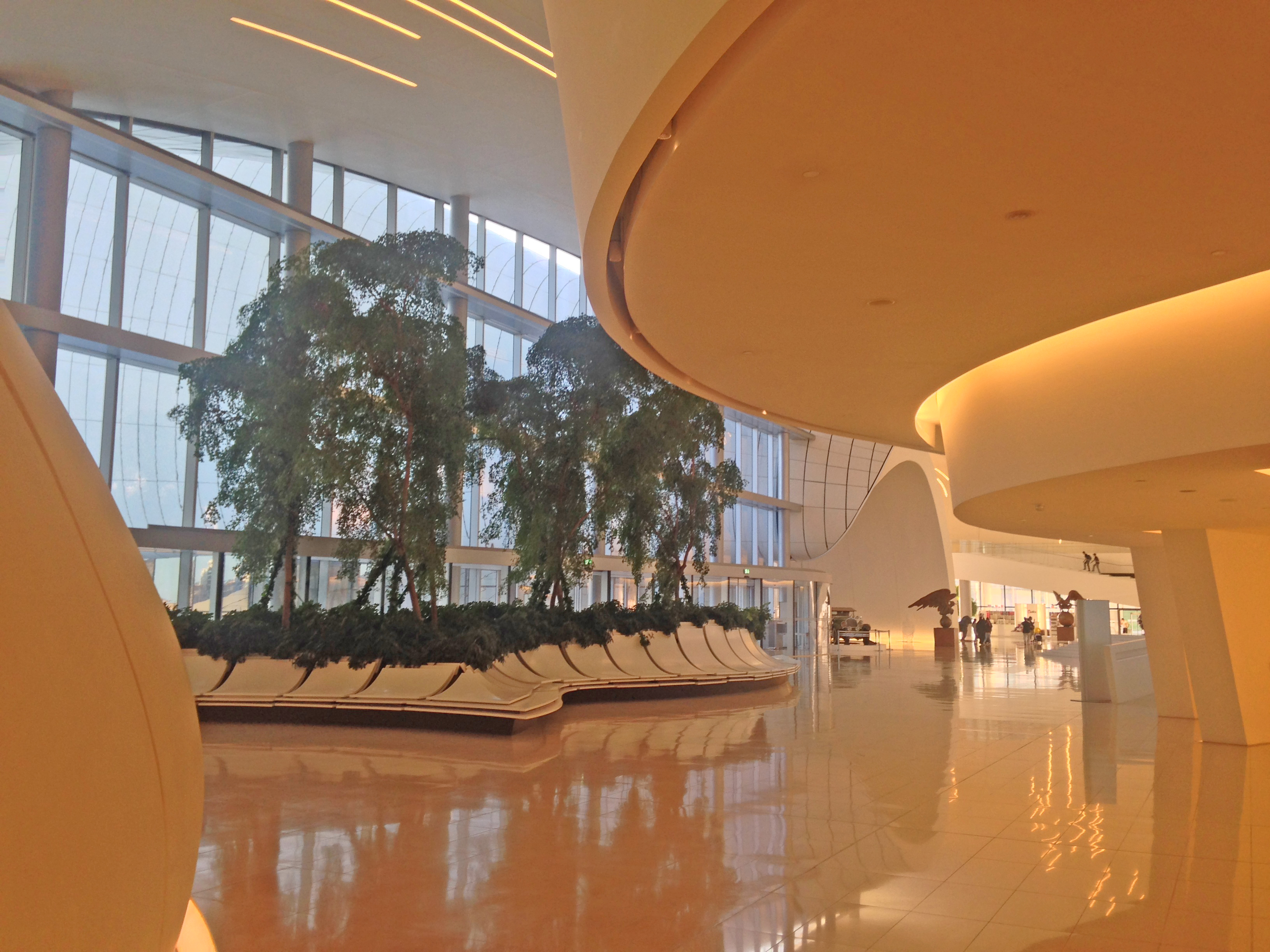
Inside view from the front of the center

== Exhibitions ==
=== "Life, Death, and Beauty" ===
On 21 June 2013, the Center held the exhibition of works by American artist Andy Warhol titled "Life, Death, and Beauty" supervised by Gianni Mercurio, dated for the 85th anniversary of the artist. The exhibition for the first time in Azerbaijan displayed over one hundred works by the artist, including featurettes by Warhol. There were shown photos of the author, portraits of the world film, music, and fashion stars, as well as other world-renowned works, including Flowers, Camouflage, The Last Supper, Male Hands Praying, and Electric Chair. On 6 August, the artist's birthday, Baku residents and visitors could freely visit the exhibition, which ran until 9 September.

=== "At the turn of the century" ===
Right wing of Heydar Aliyev Center

On 1 October 2013, the Heydar Aliyev Center held a personal exhibition of the People's Artist of Azerbaijan, vice-president of the Russian Academy of Arts Tahir Salahov, titled "At the turn of the century". The exhibition was dated for the 85th anniversary of the artist. He is recognized as one of the founders of the "severe style" in painting. The exhibition featured over 100 works by the artist, created at different times, and his works on the carpets. Among the exhibits were the portraits of Heydar Aliyev, the composer Gara Garayev and Dmitri Shostakovich, the musician Mstislav Rostropovich, the works Aidan, Morning. Absheron, Koroglu, Absheron triptych – Ateshgah, The Caspian today, Maiden Tower, and other well-known works of the people's artist. The exhibition ran until 8 November 2013.

In 2017, the center also opened its doors to the Contemporary Turkish Art Exhibition, a collection of art pieces by various Turkish artists.

=== "Masterpieces of History" exhibition ===
On 27 May 2019, the Heydar Aliyev Center hosted the "Masterpieces of History" exhibition, which included ancient artifacts from Georgia and Azerbaijan.

The majority of artifacts belong to Gajar epoch and include ceramic and metal works, canvases, miniatures and belongings of Fatali Khan, including his portrait.

The exhibition also featured photographic collection by Dmitri Yermakov, a participant of the Russian-Ottoman War of 1877-1878.

=== "Hyperrealistic Sculpture. Almost Alive" exhibition ===
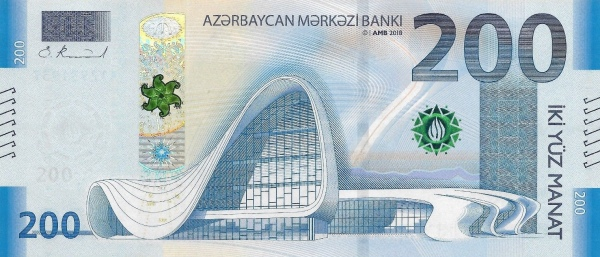
Heydar Aliyev Center on a 2018 200 manat banknote

On 29 November 2018, the Almost Alive exhibition was held at the Heydar Aliyev Center. The exhibition consisted of deformed figures of extraordinary dimensions, monochrome statues, and pieces representing various body parts.

The exhibition featured works created by Daniel Firman, Duane Hanson, Tony Matelli, Mel Ramos, Mathilde ter Heijne, Robert Graham, Allen Jones, Zharko Basheski, George Segal and other artists.

=== "Possible Dimensions" exhibition ===
On 22 May 2019, Zurab Tsereteli opened an exhibition at the Heydar Aliyev Center. The exhibition was dedicated to Zurab Tsereteli's 85th anniversary. Thirty paintings and statues brought from Moscow, Tbilisi and London were displayed at the exhibition.

=== Vienna Strauss Festival Orchestra ===
On 26 November 2018, Strauss Festival Orchestra Vienna held a concert at the Heydar Aliyev Center. The orchestra had also appeared with concerts at the Heydar Aliyev Center back in 2014 and 2016.

=== "Inner Engineering: Technologies for Wellbeing" lecture by Sadguru ===
Jaggi Vasudev, also known as Sadguru, gave a lecture in the Heydar Aliyev Center on 10 November 2018. The subject constitutes a comprehensive system derived from centuries-old yoga studies aiming at profound and sustainable personal transformation.

=== Mini Azerbaijan ===
The Mini Azerbaijan exhibition on the second floor features models of 24 historical and architectural buildings. Visitors can also learn about the history and architecture of buildings exhibited in both Azerbaijani and English.

Among exhibited buildings are those dated to the Middle Ages (Maiden Tower, Momine Khatun Mausoleum), 19th century (Baku Bazaar, Azerbaijan State Philharmonic Hall, Ismailiyya Palace), USSR era (Government House, Green Theatre), 21st century (Baku Crystal Hall, Flame Towers) as well as the buildings being constructed (Baku Olympic Stadium, State Oil Fund of the Republic of Azerbaijan).

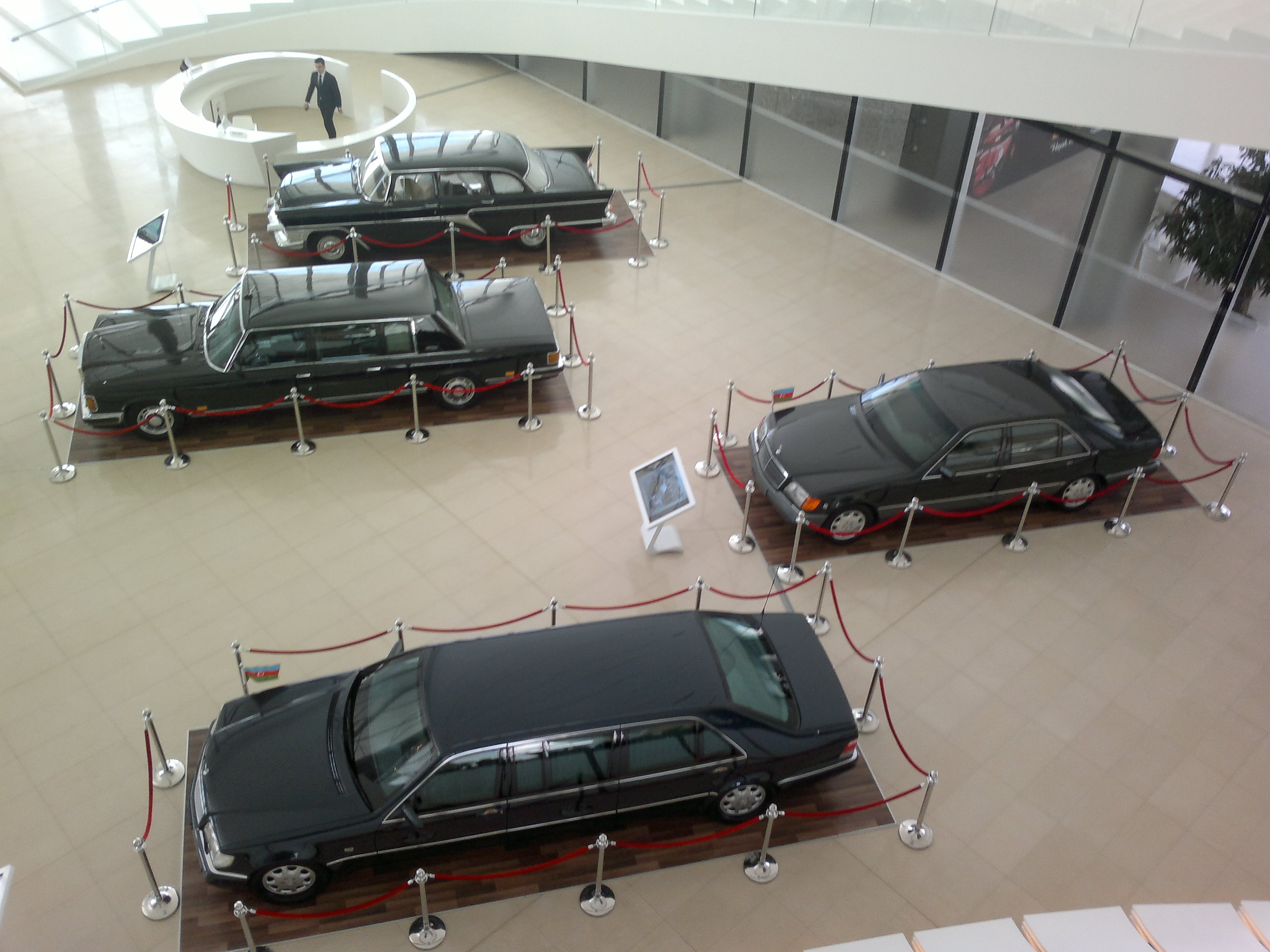
Cars belonged to Heydar Aliyev in Heydar Aliyev Center

=== International relations ===
The Heydar Aliyev Center maintains close ties with a number of international agencies, peer structures abroad, museums and exhibition centers. The Center has organized events and exhibitions as a result of joint cooperation with different organization, museums and exhibitions of Austria, Belgium, Great Britain, France, Italy, Russia, Slovenia, Turkey and so on. At the same time, it has conducted a number of projects in Great Britain, Israel, Italy, Hungary, Romania, Russia, Turkey, Japan and others.

== In popular culture ==
The building was featured in Extreme Engineering, a documentary television series that airs on the Discovery Channel and the Science Channel. The episode called "Azerbaijan's Amazing Transformation" was aired on 22 April 2011 as part of season 9. The building was seen on The Grand Tour episode entitled "Sea to unsalty sea," with presenter Jeremy Clarkson praising the building and Hadid. The building was also featured on the "postcard" of Samra Rahimli for the postcard of Azerbaijan at the Eurovision Song Contest 2016 and in a Google Doodle in 2017.

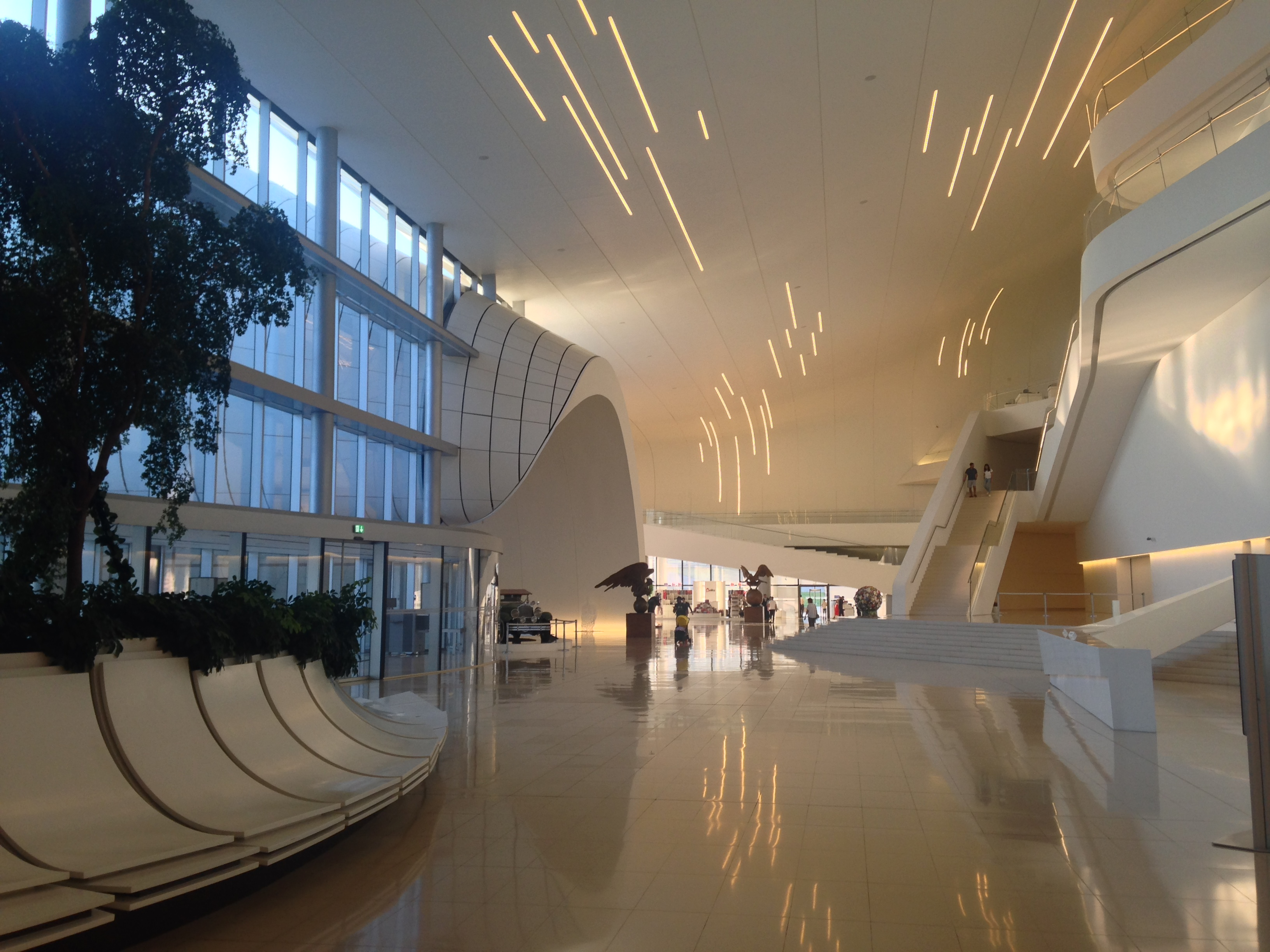
Interior of the building

On 29 June 2012, the Heydar Aliyev Center held the official opening of Crans Montana Forum, attended by the President of Azerbaijan Ilham Aliyev, President of Georgia Mikheil Saakashvili, President of Macedonia Gjorge Ivanov, President of Montenegro Filip Vujanović, as well as foreign public figures, MPs, intellectuals, and business circles.

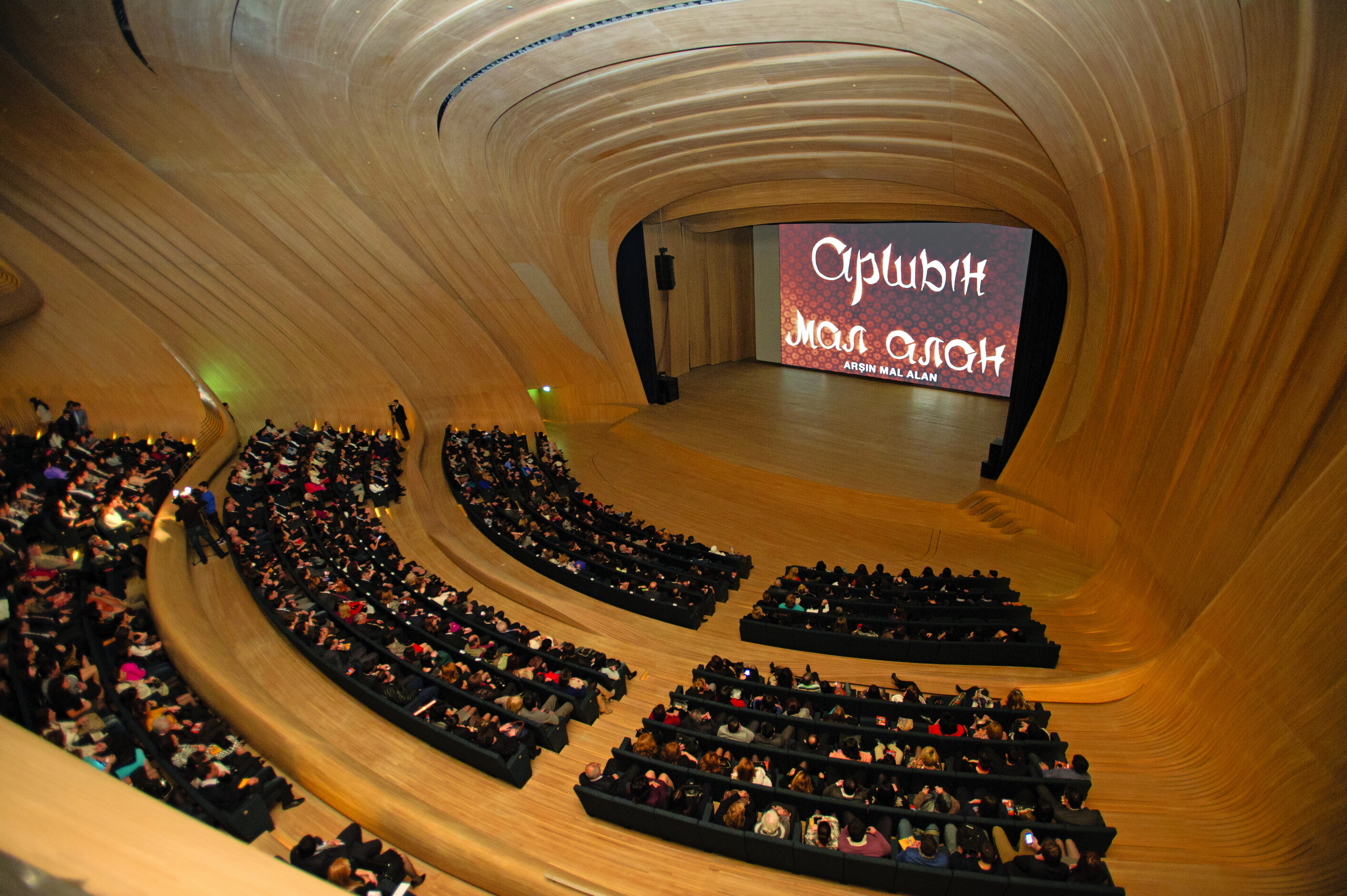
Auditorium

On 3 July 2012, the Center held the ceremony of the official seeing-off of the Azerbaijani delegation to take part in the 2012 Summer Olympic Games in London. The ceremony was attended by the President Republic of Azerbaijan, President of the National Olympic Committee Ilham Aliyev and his spouse Mehriban Aliyeva. President of Azerbaijan Ilham Aliyev made a speech at the ceremony.

After repairs following a major fire (see below), on 2 and 3 November 2013, the Moscow music theater Helikon Opera under the direction of the People's Artist of Russia Dmitry Bertman, presented performances at the Heydar Aliyev Center. On 2 November, the Helikon-Opera presented a gala concert "The Enduring Love", a program that included lyric songs by Marilyn Monroe, Tina Turner, Elton John, Celine Dion, Whitney Houston, and The Beatles. On 3 November, the artists performed the opera Siberia by the Italian composer Umberto Giordano staged by Dmitry Bertmann.

== Fire ==
On 20 July 2012, after a performance, a fire started on the roof of the building at about 11:30am. It was quickly put out by firemen, and it was initially reported that the fire only damaged the roof of the building, leaving the interior only slightly damaged, mainly because of the water used by firemen to extinguish the fire. However, the damage was later reported to have had "grave consequences and material damage on a large scale." Officials concluded the fire resulted from negligence in the use of welding equipment in the roof; three Turkish contractors were subsequently charged under Azerbaijan's criminal code. After sixteen months of repairs, it was formally re-opened on 5 November 2013.
