= Veldhuis =

Veldhuis is a Dutch toponymic surname meaning "field house". Variant forms are Te(r) Veldhuis, (Van) Veldhuizen, Velthuijs and Velthuis. Notable people with the surname include:

- Jan G.F. Veldhuis (born 1938), Dutch academic
- Lex Veldhuis (born 1983), Dutch poker player
- Marleen Veldhuis (born 1979), Dutch swimmer
- Menno Veldhuis (born 1974), Dutch artist

Variants:

- Jacob ter Veldhuis (born 1951), Dutch composer
- Mario Gerardo Piattini Velthuis (born 1966), Argentinian computer scientist
- Max Velthuijs (1923–2005), Dutch children's book illustrator and writer

== See also ==
- Velthuis, an ASCII transliteration scheme for the Sanskrit developed by Frans Velthuis (born ca. 1949)
- Veldhuizen (disambiguation)
