= Canger =

Canger is a surname. Notable people with the surname include:

- Joseph Canger (born 1956), American artist
- Una Canger (born 1938), Danish linguist

== See also ==
- Ranger (surname)
