= Ron Mueck =

Australian sculptor

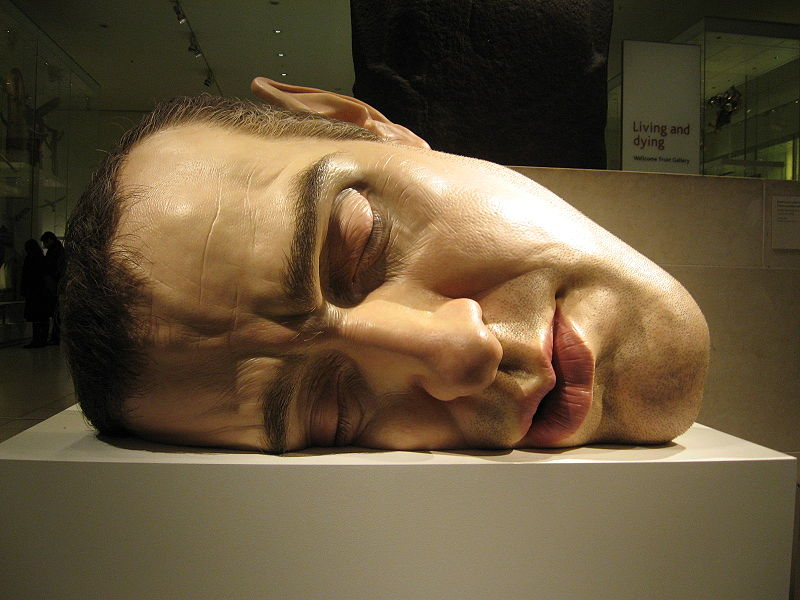
- Mask II (2001–2002) is believed to be a self-portrait
- Born: Hans Ronald Mueck; 9 May 1958 (age 68); Melbourne, Victoria, Australia
- Known for: Sculptor

Ronald Hans Mueck (/ˈmjuːɛk/ or /ˈmuːɪk/) (born Hans Ronald Mueck; 9 May 1958) is an Australian sculptor working in the United Kingdom.

== Biography ==
Born in 1958 to German parents in Melbourne, Australia, Ron Mueck grew up in the family business of puppetry and doll-making. He worked initially as a creative director in Australian children's television shows like Shirl's Neighbourhood and Lift Off, before moving to America to work there in film and advertising. Most notably, he designed, performed, and voiced the character of Ludo in the 1986 Jim Henson fantasy film Labyrinth. He later collaborated with Henson again on the TV series The Storyteller. In 1996, he was asked by Paula Rego, his mother-in-law, to make a small figure of Pinocchio for her group exhibition Spellbound: Art and Film, at the Hayward Gallery, London.

Mueck first came to public attention with his sculpture "Dead Dad". This portrayal of his recently deceased father—at roughly half-scale and made from memory and imagination—was included in the 1997 exhibition Sensation at the Royal Academy of Arts, London.

Mueck's first solo show was at the Anthony d’Offay Gallery, London in 1998. His 5-metre (16 ft) high sculpture Boy 1999 was a feature in the Millennium Dome, and later exhibited at the 49th Venice Biennale in 2001. Today it sits in the foyer of the Danish Contemporary Art Museum ARoS in Aarhus.

Between 2000 and 2002, Mueck was Associate Artist at the National Gallery, London. During this two-year post he created the works Mother and Child, Pregnant Woman, Man in a Boat, and Swaddled Baby and culminated in an exhibition in 2003.

Mueck's most recent major touring exhibition began at Fondation Cartier pour l'Art Contemporain (Paris), in 2013, and travelled to Fundacion Proa, Buenos Aires., MAM, Rio de Janeiro (marking the biggest audience in the history of that museum), and São Paulo, exhibited at the Pinacoteca.

During 2016, Mueck exhibited at the Theseus Temple, Kunsthistorisches Museum, Vienna, and Sara Hildén Art Museum, Tampere, Finland.

In 2016 Mueck also received a major solo presentation at the Museum of Fine Arts, Houston. As part of the Hull UK City of Culture the following year, Mueck's works appeared as part of SKIN, at the Ferens Art Gallery, alongside paintings by Lucian Freud and Édouard Manet, and Spencer Tunick's photographs of his installation Sea of Hull. The exhibition features a new work, Poke, as well as Wild Man, Spooning Couple, Youth, Ghost, and Mask II.

In 2024, 15 works were presented in a solo exhibition at Museum Voorlinden. The exhibition featured, among others, En Garde (2023), Mass (2016-2017), Big Baby II (1996-97), Man in Blankets (2000), and Couple under an Umbrella (2013), which is permanently on display as one of the museum’s highlights.

In 2025, works including Mass (2016-2017) were presented as a solo exhibition at National Museum of Modern and Contemporary Art in Seoul, South Korea.

In 2026, a solo exhibition at the Art Gallery of New South Wales, Sydney, featured 15 works including the new work Havoc: Pregnant Woman (2002), Woman with Shopping (2013), Spooning Couple (2005), Young Couple (2013), Dark Place (2018), Man in Blankets (2000), Ghost (1998/2014), Woman with Sticks (2009-10), Crouching Boy in Mirror (1999-2002), chicken/man (2019), Big Man (2000), Havoc (2025), This Little Piggy (2023-25), Couple Under an Umbrella (2013/2015) and Old Woman in Bed (2000/2002).

== Work ==
Mueck's sculpture responds to the minute details of the human body, playing with scale to produce engrossing visual images (a style known as hyperrealism). Mueck spends a long time, sometimes more than a year, creating each sculpture. His subject matter is deeply private, and is often concerned with people's unspoken thoughts and feelings.

== Gallery ==
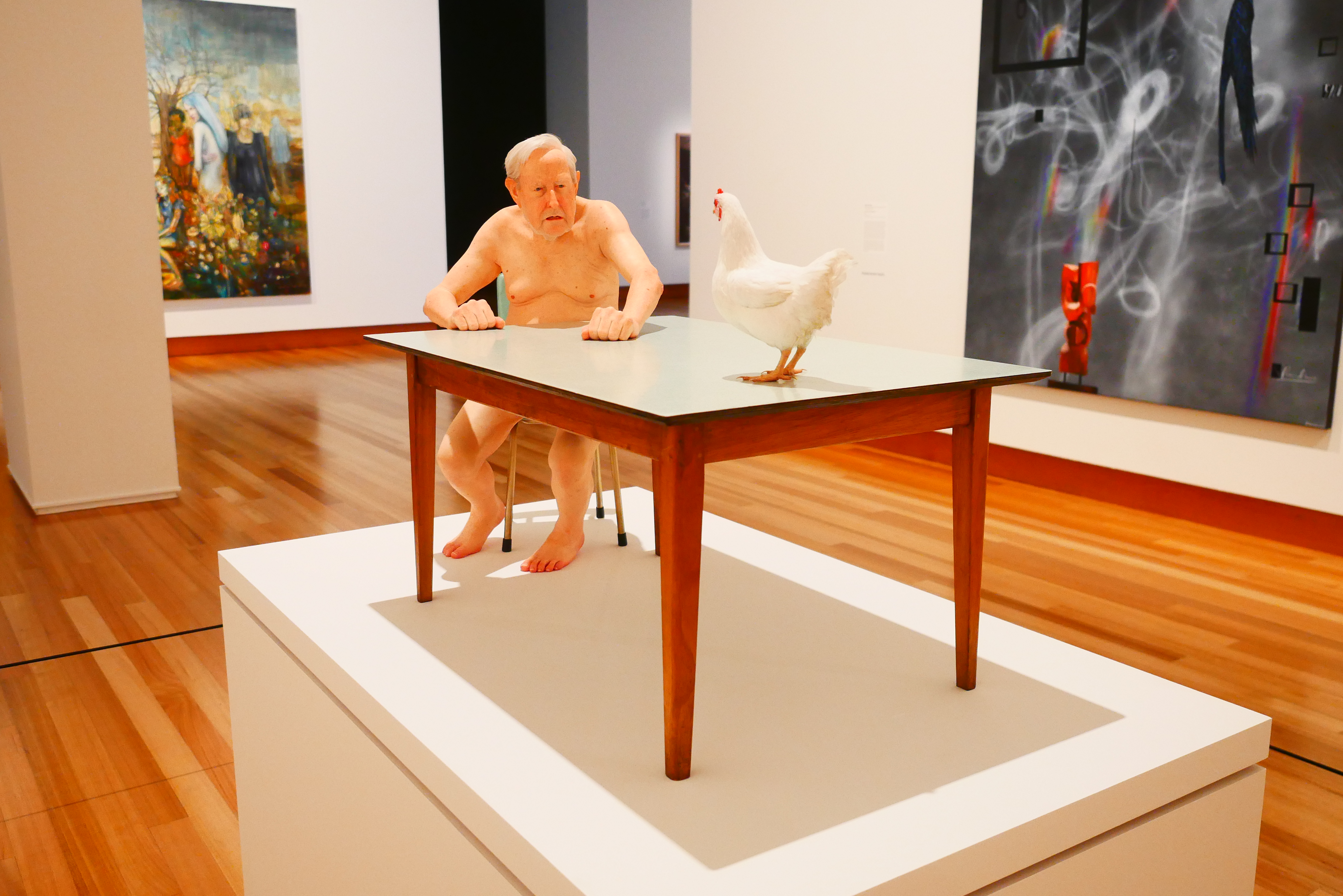
chicken/man (2019)

== See also ==
- Carole Feuerman – American sculptor
- Duane Hanson – American sculptor (1925–1996)
- George Segal (artist) – American painter and sculptor (1924–2000)
- John De Andrea – American sculptor
- Patricia Piccinini – Australian artist (born 1965)
- Roman sculpture – Sculpture of ancient Rome
- Zharko Basheski – Macedonian artist
