= Mario Gerardo Piattini Velthuis =

Mario Piattini
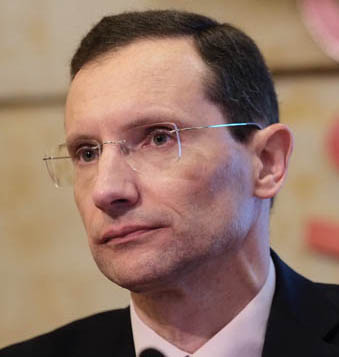
- Born: Mario Gerardo Piattini Velthuis; March 28, 1966 (age 60); Buenos Aires, Argentina
- Alma mater: Technical University of Madrid
- Occupation: Computer scientist
- Employer: University of Castilla–La Mancha

Mario Gerardo Piattini Velthuis (born March 28, 1966 in Buenos Aires, Argentina) is a Spanish-Argentine computer scientist whose research focuses on systems and software engineering. He is the founder of the Alarcos Research Group.

== Biography ==
The eldest of three siblings, Piattini was born in Buenos Aires, Argentina, and later moved to Rome, Italy, where he completed his secondary education at the Liceo de Cervantes in 1983.

In 1989, he earned his degree in Computer Science from the Technical University of Madrid (UPM), where he later received his PhD in Computer Science in 1994. After working in various companies and serving as an associate professor at the Complutense University of Madrid and the Charles III University of Madrid, he joined the University of Castilla–La Mancha (UCLM) in 1997. That same year, he founded and directed the Alarcos Research Group. Since 2002, he has been a full professor of Computer Languages and Systems at UCLM.

In 2008, he was listed among the top fifteen researchers worldwide in systems and software engineering in the independent study Top scholars in the field of systems and software engineering (2004-2008).

In 2016, he received the Aritmel award for his outstanding scientific contributions in the field of computer engineering.

In 2018, according to a study by ScienceDirect, Piattini was ranked among the 20 most active researchers in the world in Software engineering.

In 2021, Piattini was listed among the top cited researchers in the world according to the ranking elaborated by John P. A. Ioannidis (Stanford University) and co-authors.

On June 27, 2023, the National University of La Plata (Argentina) awarded him an honorary doctorate.

He received the 2024 FIUM Award from the Faculty of Computer Science of the University of Murcia (delivered in 2025) for his professional career and contributions to computer science.

On June 12, 2025, he was awarded the ISACA Madrid Professional Career Award.

In October 2026, he was included in the 2026 edition (version 9) of the Stanford University–Elsevier ranking of the world's most cited scientists, compiled by John P. A. Ioannidis and co-authors. In the career-long impact list he ranks in the top 0.95% of his subfield (4,903rd among 517,648 authors), with an h-index of 45 and 9,778 citations excluding self-citations, and is the top-ranked UCLM researcher in the Information and Communication Technologies field.

== Career ==
=== Research ===
His career began in the field of database design and advanced databases, later shifting to information systems quality, where he has directed and participated in numerous research projects. His areas of work include software engineering, quantum computing, IT governance, and data engineering.

He has been a jury member for the Information and Communication Technologies category of the BBVA Foundation Frontiers of Knowledge Award.

==== Quantum software engineering ====
Since 2020, he has worked in the field of quantum software engineering. He was a co-author of the Talavera Manifesto for Quantum Software Engineering and Programming, published in 2020 following the first QANSWER international workshop held in Talavera de la Reina. The document gathers principles and proposals for the professional development of quantum software.

He was Chief Research Officer at aQuantum, a joint quantum computing research unit of Alhambra IT and UCLM, where he participated in the development of QuantumPath, a platform for the creation and lifecycle management of quantum and hybrid software applications.

==== Software sustainability ====
In the field of software sustainability, he has worked with Coral Calero and M.ª Ángeles Moraga. He co-edited the book Green in Software Engineering (Springer, 2015) with Calero, and Software Sustainability (Springer, 2021) with Calero and Moraga, focusing on the environmental, social, and economic dimensions of software sustainability.

=== Technology transfer ===
In the area of knowledge transfer, he was a founding partner of several spin-off companies derived from UCLM research activity, including AQCLab, the first laboratory accredited by ENAC for software product quality evaluation under the ISO/IEC 25000 standard, and DQTeam, a consulting firm specializing in data governance and quality.

== Selected publications ==
Mario Piattini has published numerous articles in indexed international journals and conference proceedings, and has published a large number of books related to Software engineering, Databases, Information systems, and Quantum computing.

Among the collective works he has co-edited are:

- With Coral Calero: Green in Software Engineering. Springer, 2015. ISBN 978-3-319-08580-7.
- With Coral Calero and M.ª Ángeles Moraga: Software Sustainability. Springer, 2021. ISBN 978-3-030-69969-7.
- With Manuel A. Serrano and Ricardo Pérez-Castillo: Quantum Software Engineering. Springer, 2022.
- With Iaakov Exman, Ricardo Pérez-Castillo and Michael Felderer: Quantum Software: Aspects of Theory and System Design. Springer, 2024 (open access). ISBN 978-3-031-64135-0.
