= CJ Hendry =

Australian artist (born 1988)

- Born: Catherine Jenna Hendry; 1988 (age 37–38)
- Style: Hyper-realism
- Children: 3
- Website: cjhendrystudio.com

Catherine Jenna Hendry (born 1988), commonly known as CJ Hendry, is an Australian contemporary artist known for hyper-realistic and large-scale renderings of luxury objects using a self-developed scribbling technique.

== Life and career ==
Hendry was born in South Africa and raised in Brisbane, Australia. She studied architecture at Queensland University of Technology and finance at University of Queensland in Australia, before dropping out to pursue an art career in 2013. Hendry lived and practiced in Brisbane prior to moving to New York in 2015.

Hendry's practice started as a hobby. She has no formal art training and considers herself "not very creative." Her works are primarily hyper-realistic, large scale ink drawings of luxury objects that sometimes take 200 hours to complete. Working with ink on paper her pieces are achieved through layers of what she refers to as scribbles. She uses photographs with edited saturated lighting, a ruler and a pen as a guide for their placement. Hendry credits her fame to social media attributing her first sale in 2014, a depiction of RM Williams boots that sold for $10,000, to Instagram. An executive from Australia's Macquarie Bank paid US$50,000 for a drawing of a rumpled Gucci shopping bag. More widely-known owners of her pieces include Kanye West, who bought a piece of a US$100 bill with a portrait of his face drawn on it alongside iconic fashion designer Vera Wang.

In 2015 she dipped a pair of US$9,000 Nike Air Mags in a bucket of black paint in order to use as a study for a hyper-realistic drawing.

In 2016 Hendry expanded her practice with the launch of a collaboration with fashion house Christian Louboutin. The resulting exhibition, held in the Anita Chan Lia-ling Gallery at the Fringe Club in Hong Kong as part of the 2017 Art Basel, marked Hendry's first time working with colour and wax pencil. The difference, the artist explains, is that "color is very difficult, because you've got to use multiple different colors to create one."

== Controversy ==
In November 2025, Hendry used ChatGPT to generate 30-40 designs of her Juju toys that were made as a response to the Labubu craze. She was open about her use of AI on her Instagram and posted a video saying that "AI is like porn, it does a job, but it does not do the job." Many people disagreed with her response, pointing out that AI is trained off of other people's artwork.

In June 2026, during Hendry's Flower Market exhibition, the artist was criticized for the culture of consumption surrounding her work following scuffles and fights which broke out as visitors scrambled to grab as many of the plush flowers featured in the exhibition as possible to resell for inflated prices.

== Exhibitions ==
- Pastel (2026)
- Juju Market (2026)
- Flower Market (2026)
- Bargain Bodega (2024)
- Flower Market (2024)
- Public Pool (2024)
- PLAID (2023)
- Cheese (2022)
- Epilogue (postponed due to COVID-19 - early 2022)
- Blonde (2021)
- Straya (2021)
- Rorschach (2019)
- Monochrome (2018)
- Complementary Colours (2017)
- The Trophy Room (2016)
- 50 Foods in 50 Days (2015)
- The Art Hunter (2014)
