= Leng Jun =

Chinese painter

Leng Jun (Chinese: 冷軍; born 1963) is a Chinese painter from Sichuan Province, China. He graduated in 1984 from the Teachers College, Hankou, Wuhan, the branch of the Department of Arts. He is known for his hyperrealistic paintings and drawings that appear like photographs. He currently serves as the Leader of the Wuhan Painting Academy and Chairman of the Wuhan Artists Association.

His first work using photorealism was the 2004 oil painting Mona Lisa.

He was awarded an honorary doctorate from Birmingham City University in 2018.

== Publications ==
- Leng Juns Oil Painting Collection Limitation and Freedom. Jilin Fine Arts, 2012. ISBN 9787538670196.

== See also ==
- Chinese painting
- Chinese art
