= José Ramón Muro =

Spanish painter

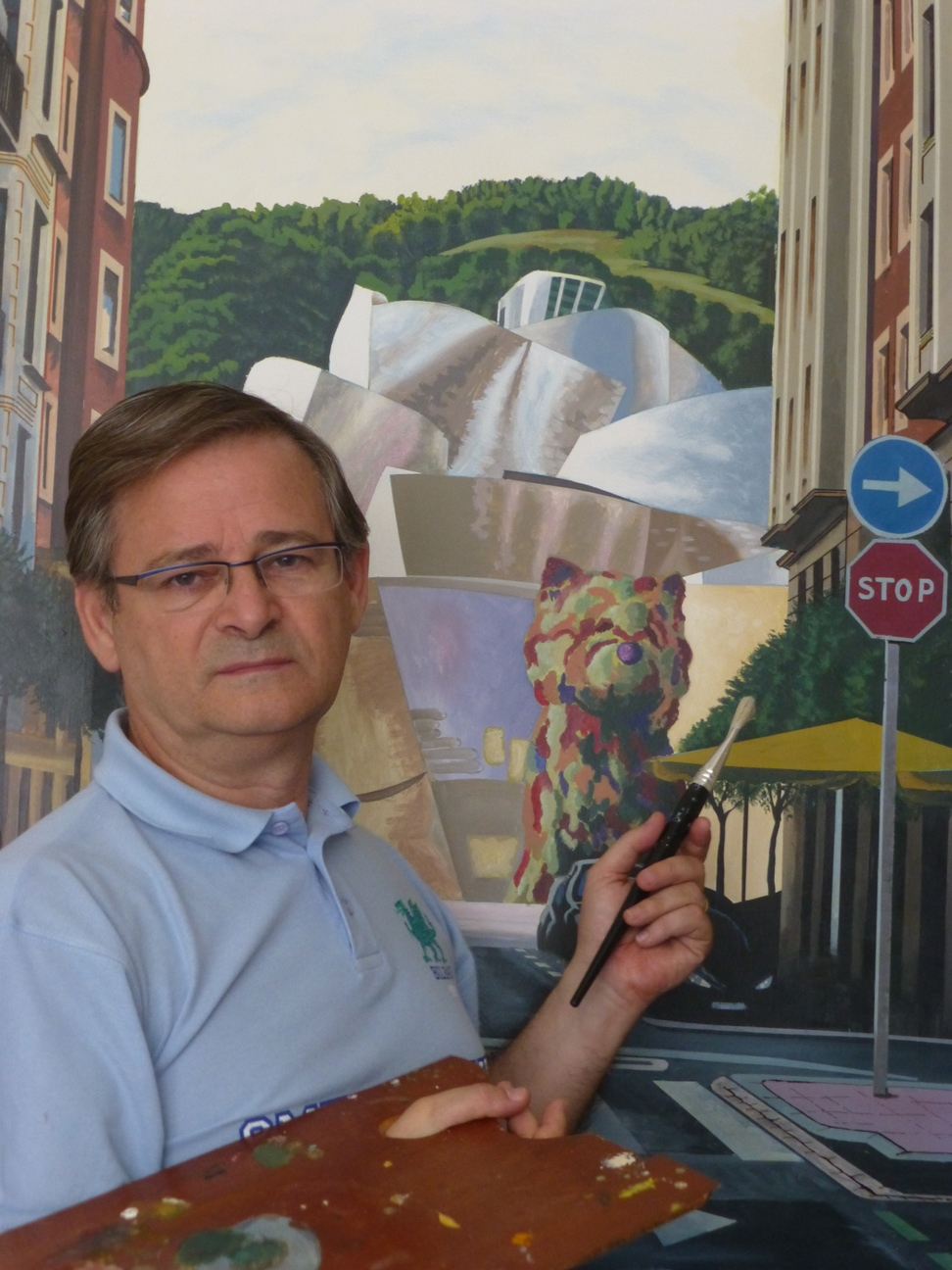
José Ramón Muro and his painting at the Guggenheim Museum in Bilbao.

José Ramón Muro Pereg (born 14 July 1954 in Bilbao, Vizcaya) is a Spanish painter. He specializes in hyperrealist paintings.

== Biography ==
=== Early life ===
Born in Bilbao in 1954, Muro began painting from childhood. At age 22 he presented his first solo exhibition. At this time he was a pupil of the Basque painter José Luis Aldecoa, but his technical training influenced his painting framed in pop art with a tendency towards hyperrealism. He combined painting with artistic forms such as documentary cinema and photography, while working as an engineer.

=== Figurative painting ===
On the border of hyperrealism, natural landscapes, urban landscapes, portraits and other more classic framed within imaginative realism are some of his most outstanding works. He typically applies acrylic paint on wooden canvas and applies mixed techniques.
