= Jane Kahan Gallery =

Art gallery in Manhattan, New York

Coordinates: 40°46′21.59″N 73°57′53.94″W

Jane Kahan Gallery is an art gallery located in New York City that specializes in modern art. The gallery collection is founded on prints, monotypes, and paintings, including ceramics and works on paper by Pablo Picasso, and tapestries by artists such as Romare Bearden, Alexander Calder, Marc Chagall, Sonia Delaunay, Roberto Sebastián Matta, and Fernand Léger. Established by art dealer and collector Jane Kahan in 1973 following graduation from Mount Holyoke College, the gallery initially operated as Kahan Esikoff Fine Arts prior to changing the name to Jane Kahan Gallery. The gallery maintains its original space on the Upper East Side and an exhibition space in Lower Manhattan.

In addition to works by 19th and 20th century "Modern Master" artists, the gallery has been known to represent select contemporary artists including Hungarian-born French hyperrealist painter Istvan Sandorfi.

The gallery is a member of the Fine Art Dealers Association (FADA), CINOA, and a founding member of the International Fine Print Dealers Association.

== Tapestries ==
Representing the French tradition of tapestry production, the gallery deals with works designed and woven in prominent 20th century workshops established by Yvette Cauquil-Prince, Marie Cuttoli, Jacqueline de la Baume Dürrbach, and François Tabard. These master cartoonists created their plans in collaboration with many modern artists such as Joan Miró, Fernand Léger, and Victor Vasarely.

Tapestry artists often trained in workshops of Aubusson and Gobelins origin. These French houses of manufacture achieved fame for their technically skilled textiles popular with 17th century collectors and heads of state throughout Europe. Many of these workshops produced a number of modern tapestries before closing in the late half of the 20th century, following WWII. Houses like Pinton remain in practice of centuries of manufacturing knowledge, and continue to collaborate with artists like Peter Sis in their series Art for Amnesty-Sis-Atelier Pinton.

Collectors of mid-20th century tapestry worked with designers such as, Gloria Ross, who established the Gloria F. Ross Center in 1997, later becoming the Gloria F. Ross Tapestry Program at the University of Arizona. This marks an important continuation of the European tapestry tradition globally. Another example of this can be found in Pablo Picasso's tapestry reproduction of Guernica, commissioned by Nelson Rockefeller in 1955, and placed on long-term loan in 1985 to the Headquarters of the United Nations. For a brief period in 2009, during planned renovations to the United Nations building, the tapestry was exhibited at the Whitechapel Gallery in London. In 2012 the tapestry was loaned to the San Antonio Museum of Art in the U.S. State of Texas, returning to the United Nations in 2015. The Rockefeller family had the tapestry conserved in 2021-2022 and rehung in its traditional position outside the Security Council chambers. The New York Times misreported in February 2022 that the tapestry was a "canvas replica of Picasso's painting," when the tapestry is in fact hand-woven.

== Bibliography ==
- Baal-Teshuva, Jacob. (2000). Tapisserien : Hommage an die Meisterweberin Yvette Cauquil-Prince und Sammlung Jane Kahan, Tapisserien aus dem Atelier Pinton, Aubusson KunstHaus Wien, 10. Februar – 14. Wien: KunstHaus.
- de Burton, Simon. “Past Masters Secondhand but not Second Best: Picasso Ceramics.” Financial Times, March 2005.
- Cauquil-Prince, Yvette, Musée du pays de Sarrebourg. (2005). Tapisseries d’Yvette Cauquil-Prince : Musée du pays de Sarrebourg, 13 mai-3 septembre 2005. [Sarrebourg]: Musée du pays de Sarrebourg.
- Gale, Amy. “Fiber ‘Paintings’.” Art & Antiques, January 2004.
- Gibson Stoodley, Sheila. “Dream Weavers: Picasso, Calder, Chagall, and Other Modern Artists Breathed new Life into the Medieval Craft of Tapestry.” Art & Antiques, September 2009.
- Hedlund, Ann. (2010). Gloria F. Ross & modern tapestry. New Haven [Conn.]: Yale University Press.
- Lauria, Joe. “Art Market: Picasso the Ceramist.” ArtNews, April 1999.
- Moonan, Wendy. “Le Corbusier Saw Tapestry as Part of Art.” The New York Times, September 28, 2001 Antiques column
- Sadeh, Deidre. “Picasso at the Wheel.” Art & Auction, May 1991.
- Sandorfi, Etienne. (1997). Istvan Sandorfi : works 1987–1997. Paris: Editions Garnier Nocera.
- Sandorfi, Etienne. (2007). Sandorfi. Budapest: Makláry Artworks KFT
