= Oresegun Olumide =

Nigerian artist

- Born: 1981 (age 44–45); Ikorodu, Lagos State, Nigeria
- Education: Yaba College of Technology
- Occupation: Artist
- Years active: 2005–present

Oresegun Olumide is a Nigerian hyper-realistic artist. On 8 March 2016, he received media attention in Nigeria and beyond after he posted some of his oil on canvas paintings on social media website Facebook.

== Early life and education ==
Born in Ikorodu, a suburb of Lagos, Olumide's love for drawing and painting started when he was 4. He is an alumnus of Yaba College of Technology, Yaba, Lagos where he graduated with a distinction in Fine Art. He cites Pablo Picasso and Michelangelo di Lodovico Buonarroti Simoni as his role models.

== Career ==
The hyperrealism created in the oil paintings makes his work seem so lifelike that it is hard to believe they aren't.

— Esra Gurkan, CNN, March 9, 2016

Olumide started painting professionally in 2005. His drawing and painting are inspired by his environment, mostly using water as the principal theme of his works. Olumide currently owns an art studio in Ikorodu where he showcases his works and exhibitions.
