= Frédéric Gracia =

French artist (born 1959)

Frédéric Gracia (born 1959, in Paris) is a French artist, who is known for his trompe-l'œil murals, often in a hyperrealistic style and often on large exterior surfaces such as water towers and industrial chimneys. He calls himself a peintre-alpiniste (climber-painter) because he uses rope access techniques such as rappelling to create large outdoor murals.

== Early work ==
After studies in the decorative arts and a short period working as an illustrator in a graphics design studio, Gracia began his career as a painter working for Club Med as a decorator-scenographer.

In 1986, while travelling in Asia, he painted a fluorescent backdrop for a concert by Chick Corea in Hong Kong.

In 1990, he worked for Paquet Cruises aboard the Mermoz, providing scenery for the night-time entertainment.

== Large trompe-l'œil works ==
As a child, he was equally fascinated by mountain climbing; looking for a painter able to work at great heights, Jean-Marie Pierret hired him in 1991 to paint Aquarius, a giant mural on one of the four cooling towers of the Cruas Nuclear Power Plant in Ardèche, France. He did so with the assistance of eight mountain guides. This led to more commissions. For example, in 1995 he worked with Catherine Feff and the Bouygues company on the inside of the dome of a mosque in Turkmenistan; for this job, scaffolding was used.

In 2007, directing a team of rappelling painters via walkie-talkie over two months, he decorated the two 52-metre chimneys of the thermo-electric plant at Bagnolet, in the suburbs of Paris, with murals of drops of water 1.1–metres in diameter. In 2009, his services were suggested as an alternative to an as yet incomplete computer-controlled large-scale printer for the projected decoration of all the dams in Valais, Switzerland, with murals 700 metres wide and 250 metres high.

However, he prefers to work alone, using rope access techniques. He compares the work to spelunking, since the movement is downwards, not upwards as in climbing.

On commission from various settlements, he has painted water towers for example with his brother Pascal at Treffiagat, and also wall murals, for example at Fontenay-aux-Roses a sepia-tinted mural of a past street scene based on an archival photograph, "like a wink at the passage of time."

An example of interior trompe-l'œil work is his decoration of toilet rooms in residences as the command station of a submarine or a space exploration vehicle.

In 2000, from a field of 22,000 artists representing 51 countries, Gracia was selected as one of five award-winners from France in the Winsor and Newton Worldwide Millennium Painting Competition sponsored by Winsor & Newton and the Prince of Wales. His painting Blue World was included in a worldwide touring exhibition which began at St James's Palace and ended at the United Nations Headquarters in New York.

== Stylistic influences ==
When he first started painting, Gracia was influenced by the American and Japanese hyperrealist painters, and by René Magritte.

== Exhibitions ==
- Paris Institute of Oceanography
- Exposition Saphir.
- Le Manège, Saint-Germain-en-Laye
- Japan Air Lines, Champs-Élysées, Paris
- Winsor and Newton Worldwide Millennium Painting Competition: World Trade Center, Stockholm; St James's Palace, London; United Nations Headquarters, New York
- Gallery, Orly Airport, Paris
- Salon des artistes français, Grand Palais - Paris
- Salon Art Capital, Grand Palais - Paris
- Salon d'Igny (guest of honour)
- Galeries Artitude.
- Galerie Paradis
- Paris town halls: 9th, 13th, 3rd arrondissements
- Town Hall, Châtillon
- Éspace Maison Blanche, Châtillon
- Centre Jacques Prévert, Châtillon
- Town Hall, Le Plessis-Robinson (D'Artagnan on permanent display in council chamber)
- Le Moulin Fidel. Robinson
- FNAC Les Halles - Paris
- Salons Vianey. Paris (permanent exhibit)
- Galerie du Château. Pau (64)
- Galerie Leitner. Paris
- Aquarium de Paris - Cinéaqua
- Guest of honour at Château de Ferrière (77)
- Gallery Espace 22 - Monaco
- Gallery Lou Babazouk - Nice
- Town hall, Tulle (19)
- Guest of honour at 46th Salon d'Arts Plastiques, Châtillon (2007)
- Arts and Sciences in Limousin: Town Hall, Aubusson
