= Yvette Cauquil-Prince =

Belgian weaver and craftswoman

Yvette Cauquil-Prince (second from left) in front of the Chagall-Cauquil-Prince tapestry "Le Gant Noir"

Yvette Cauquil-Prince (French pronunciation: [ivɛt kokil pʁɛ̃s]; 10 July 1928 – 1 August 2005) was a Belgian-born weaver and master craftswoman who created tapestries in direct collaboration with renowned 20th-century artists and/or their estates. She is best known for her association with the artist Marc Chagall, which resulted in over 40 tapestries, but she also created tapestries of art works by Pablo Picasso, Max Ernst, Roberto Matta, Paul Klee, Fernand Léger, Pierre Wemaëre, Wassily Kandinsky, Brassai, Alexander Calder, Niki de Saint Phalle, and others.

Cauquil-Prince attended the Académie Royale des Beaux-Arts of Mons in Belgium, but her mastery of tapestry weaving was largely self-taught, inspired by her study of Coptic textiles and tapestries from the Renaissance and Middle Ages.

She established her first studio in Paris in the late 1950s and later worked in Corsica. In 1963 Marie Cuttoli engaged Cauquil-Prince to weave Picasso tapestries, under the condition that she would remain in the background and never meet the artist personally. One of these tapestries, La Fermière, is now in the Picasso Museum at Antibes.

Cauquil-Prince was awarded the Chevalier of the Ordre national du Mérite in 1977 by the French government.

== Collaboration with Chagall ==
Cauquil-Prince was introduced to Chagall by Madeleine Malraux, wife to the French minister of Culture, André Malraux, shortly after Chagall had created tapestries for the Israeli Knesset in the mid-1960s. Chagall and Cauquil-Prince formed a close personal as well as professional relationship which lasted until Chagall's death in 1985.

"I am like a conductor," she told an interviewer, "and Chagall is the music. I must understand the work of Chagall so profoundly that I myself do not exist." Chagall called her "the Toscanini of tapestry," and declared that "there will never be a tapestry by Chagall without you."

In the early 1970s Chagall's wife, Vava, became jealous of her husband's special relationship with his collaborator (Chagall made it a point to tell everyone that Yvette Cauquil-Prince was his "petite fille" and spiritual daughter"). Shortly after executing commissions from the Jewish Museum Milwaukee and the Rehabilitation Institute of Chicago for what would be the first Chagall tapestries in America, Yvette was prevented from working with Chagall for a decade. During this period she developed her association with Max Ernst.

Shortly before Chagall's death Vava relented and Cauquil-Prince resumed their collaboration. Chagall made Cauquil-Prince promise to continue to translate his works into tapestries, which she did with Vava's blessings and later with Chagall's children and grandchildren with whom she remained very close.

== Exhibitions ==
=== Solo exhibitions ===
- 1971, Galerie Verrière, Paris, France
- 1975, Chapelle des Cordeliers, Sarrebourg, France
- 1976, Exposition Marc Chagall, Hongrie et Pologne
- 1976, Exposition Max Ernst, Arles, France
- 1976, Exposition Max Ernst, USA
- 1976, Exposition Max Ernst, Palais des Beaux-Arts, Bruxelles, Belgique
- 1976, Exposition Max Ernst, Arts Center Museum, Philadelphia, PA
- 1976, Exposition Max Ernst, Art Center, Milwaukee, WI
- 1976, Exposition Max Ernst, Art Center Museum, Los Angeles, CA
- 1976, Galerie Dario Boccara, Paris, France
- 1979, Musée de Heidelberg, Allemagne
- 1979, Musée de Céret, Catalogne, France
- 1981, Centre Teschigahara, Tokyo, Japan
- 1983, Abbaye de l'Epau, France
- 1985, Musé de l'Athénée, Geneva, Switzerland
- 1991, Musée de Heidelberg, Germany
- 1992, Exposition Yvette Cauquil-Prince, Tampere, Finland
- 1993, Exposition Yvette Cauquil-Prince, Veruela Abbey, Spain
- 1993, Exposition Yvette Cauquil-Prince, Zaragoza, Spain
- 1994, Inauguration of Chagall tapestry La Paix, Sarrebourg, France
- 1996, Three Japanese Museums, Musée Mercéan à Kannùzuwa, (April 2—October 2)
- 1996, Exposition Yvette Cauquil-Prince (December 2—January 10, 1997), Marseille, France
- 1997, Exposition Yvette Cauquil-Prince (March 27—May 25), Musée de Liège, Belgium
- 1997, Musée du Mans, France (July 1—September 2)
- 1998, Heidelberg, Germany
- 1998, New York, NY
- 1998, Minsk, Belarus
- 2005, Musée du Pays de Sarrebourg (May 13—September 3), France

=== Group exhibitions ===
- 1971, Biennale de Lausanne, Switzerland
- 1972, Museum of Edinburgh, Scotland
- 1973, Palais des Beaux-Arts, Charleroi, Belgium
- 1975, Exposition Paul Klee, Galerie Flinker, Paris, France
- 1975, Biennale de Menton, France
- 1976, Musée des Arts Décoratifs, Paris, France
- 1977, Exposition Marc Chagall, Tokyo, Kyoto, Nagoya, Kumamoto, Japon
- 1980–1981, Musée de l'Ordre de la Libération, Paris, France
- 1986, Tokyo, Osaka, Yokohana, Kyoto, Japan
- 1992, Exposition Marc Chagall, Barcelona, Spain
- 1992, Exposition Marc Chagall, Mexico City, Mexico
- 1995, Exposition Marc Chagall, Linz, Austria
- 1995, Exposition Marc Chagall, Saint-Paul-de-Vence and Nice-Cimiez, France
- 1996, Retrospective in Japan
- 2000, Exposition Chagall, Johannesburg and Cape Town, South Africa
- 2000, Exposition Chagall, Minsk, Belarus
- 2004, Jewish Museum, Frankurt-am-Main (Chagall), Germany

=== Selected art fairs ===
Exhibited by the Jane Kahan Gallery:

- 2001–2003, Art Miami
- 2007, Haughton Art and Design Fair New York
- 2007–2008, Los Angeles Art Show
- 2008, Moscow World Fine Art Fair
- 2010, Los Angeles Art Show
- 2010, Haughton Art Antiques London
- 2010, International Fine Art and Antique Dealers Show New York
- 2011, Haughton Art Antiques London
