= István Sándorfi =

Hungarian painter

István Sándarofi Étienne Sandorfi
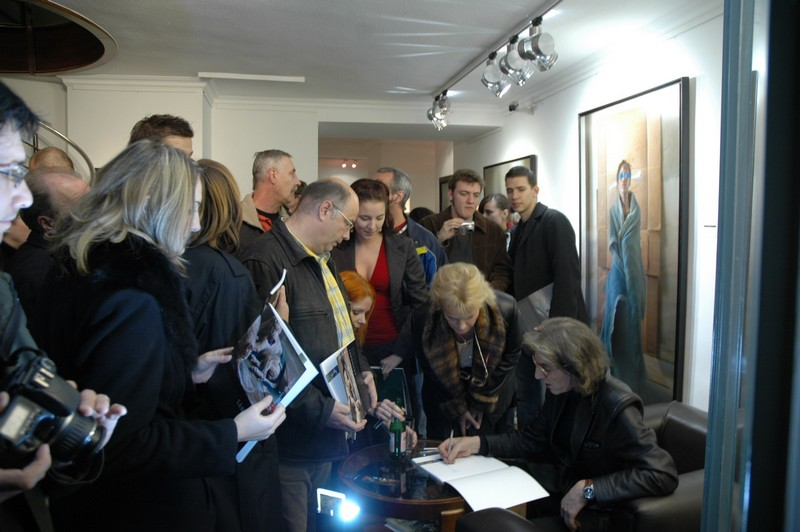
- István Sándorfi in 2006
- Born: 12 June 1948; Budapest, Hungary
- Died: 26 December 2007 (aged 59); Paris, France
- Known for: Painter
- Movement: Hyperrealism

István Sándorfi (In France Étienne Sandorfi; 12 June 1948 – 26 December 2007) was a Hungarian hyperrealist painter.

== Early life and career ==
Istvan (known as Etienne) Sandorfi was born in Budapest in 1948. His father was director of the American company IBM in Hungary. Because of this association he served five years in prisons under the Communist leadership and his family was deported to an isolated Hungarian village. At the time of the 1956 uprising the Sandorfi family fled the country and became expatriates, first in Germany, then in France. Greatly affected by the violence of the revolution and by the aberration of political systems in general, Istvan took refuge in drawing and then, at the age of 12, in oil painting.

Art became his overriding passion to the detriment of his schooling. At the age of 17, while still in secondary school, Sandorfi had his first individual exhibition at a small gallery in Paris. After his second exhibition, in 1966, he gave up drawing to devote himself exclusively to painting.

In view of the morbid nature of his son's paintings and their lack of commercial success, Sandorfi's father enrolled Istvan at the School of Fine Arts, where he was to gain a degree, and at the School of Decorative Arts.

This, the family thought, would give him a more prestigious status than that of mere "artist". Gradually he achieved financial independence by accepting, along with the occasional sale of paintings, portrait commissions and few advertising illustrations. In 1973 Sandorfi had his first significant exhibition, at the Museum of Modern Art in Paris. Exhibitions were to follow in France, Germany, Belgium and finally the United States.

For about fifteen years he painted a series of large-scale self-portraits, sometimes told to be aggressive and theatrical in character, which gave him an ambiguous reputation with the public. It was written that he 'painted like an assassin'. From 1988 onwards the artist abandoned his disturbing images and began to concentrate and further elaborate on his technique.

Preferring exclusive contracts, less for financial reasons than to avoid the administrative aspects of his career and a professional milieu with which he couldn't identify, Sandorfi worked with the Beaubourg Gallery from 1974 to 1976, and then for seven years with the Isy Brachot Gallery. From 1984 to 1988 his work was exhibited in various galleries by a patron and collector and then handled by the Prazan-Fitoussi Gallery from 1990 to 1993.

From 1994 to 2001, his paintings were represented by the Jane Kahan Gallery in New York. Visceral and self-taught in work as in life, Sandorfi since childhood distrusted 'things learned' and remained true to his personal convictions. He preferred to paint at night, but each day went to bed later than the day before, thus living in a perpetual time lag, which sidelined him from any social life. Sandorfi reconciled this isolation with his family circle (he was the father of two girls, Ange and Eve) and his emotional life. From 2005 the Kalman Maklary Fine Arts represented Sandorfi, and in 2007 organized the first retrospective exhibition of the artist, with a monograph of his works.

== Exhibitions ==
- 1966 - Galerie des Jeunes, Paris • Galerie de la Barbière, Le Barroux
- 1970 - Galerie 3+2, Paris
- 1973 - Musée d'Art Moderne de la Ville de Paris
- 1974 - Galerie Daniel Gervis, Paris
- 1975 - Galerie Beaubourg, Paris
- 1976 - Bucholz Galerie, Munich
- 1977, 1980 - Galerie Isy Brachot, Brussels
- 1978, 1981, 1983 - Galerie Isy Brachot, Paris
- 1979 - FIAC, Galerie Isy Brachot, Paris
- 1981 - Galerie Isy Brachot, Basel
- 1982 - Amaury Taitinger Gallery, New York City
- 1984 - FIAC, Galerie Isy Brachot, Paris
- 1986 - Galerie Lavignes-Bastille, Paris - Galerie de Bellecour, Lyon
- 1987 - Lavignes-Bastille Gallery, Los Angeles - Hôtel de Ville, Nancy
- 1988 - Armory Show '88, Lavignes-Bastille Gallery, New York - Abbaye des Cordeliers, Châteauroux (retrospektív) - Louis K. Meisel Gallery, New York City - FIAC, Galerie Lavignes-Bastille, Paris
- 1991 - Galerie Prazan-Fitussi, Paris
- 1993 - Galerie Guénéguaud, Paris - Galerie Mann, Paris
- 1994, 1997 - Jane Kahan Gallery, New York City – Art Miami, Jane Kahan Gallery
- 1997 – Seattle Art Fair, Jane Kahan Gallery
- 1999 - Galerie Tempera, Brussels
- 1999-2000 - Gallerihuset, Copenhagen – The International 20th Century Arts Fair New York, Jane Kahan Gallery
- 2002 – Art Palm Beach, Jane Kahan Gallery
- 2006 - Kalman Makláry Fine Arts, Budapest
- 2007 - A test színeváltozása. Életműkiállítás, MODEM - Kalman Makláry Fine Arts, Debrecen - Los Angeles Art Show, Jane Kahan Gallery
- 2008 - Moscow World Fine Art Fair, Kalman Maklary Fine Arts, Jane Kahan Gallery
- 2008 - Haughton Art and Design Fair New York, Jane Kahan Gallery
- 2009, 2010 - Los Angeles Art Show, Jane Kahan Gallery
- 2010, 2011 - Haughton Art Antiques London, Jane Kahan Gallery
- 2010 - Kalman Makláry Fine Arts, Budapest
- 2010 - Haughton International Fine Art & Antiques Dealers Show, Jane Kahan Gallery
- 2011 - Kalman Makláry Fine Arts, Budapest
- 2014 - Kalman Makláry Fine Arts, Etienne Sandorfi Early drawings 1964 Budapest
- 2015 - Kalman Makláry Fine Arts, Csernus-Mehes-Sandorfi Budapest
- 2016 - #MEAM - Barcelona
- 2019 - Kalman Makláry Fine Arts, Budapest
- 2029 - #Hokimuseum in Japan.
