= Otto Duecker =

American painter (1948–2026)

- Born: April 16, 1948; Milwaukee, Wisconsin, U.S.
- Died: January 23, 2026 (aged 77)
- Known for: Painting
- Movement: Hyperrealism

Otto Duecker (April 16, 1948 – January 23, 2026) was an American Hyperrealist painter and draughtsman.

Duecker graduated from Oklahoma State University and became known for his Hyperrealist renderings of floating fruit, still lifes and latterly his near photographic oil paintings of both contemporary and historical celebrities. In order to achieve his desired effect, Duecker relied on traditional oil paint and brushed with a classical application.

He exhibited his work in fine art galleries in the United States and abroad. Additionally, Duecker's work is owned by numerous corporate and public collections including the Philbrook Museum of Art, the Fred Jones Jr. Museum of Art and the Brandywine River Museum.

Duecker died on January 23, 2026, at the age of 77.
