= Sam Jinks =

Australian sculptor (born 1973)

Sam Jinks (born 1973) is an Australian sculptor who creates lifelike but fragile figures using silicone, resin, calcium carbonate, fibreglass and hair. Jinks describes the human form as "a physics lesson in a ball of bones and meat". Jink's work has been exhibited in Australia and internationally.

== Biography ==
Jinks was born in 1973 in Bendigo, Victoria, in Australia. The artist lives and works in Melbourne.

== Collections ==
Jink's work is held in Australian and international collections including Ipswich Art Gallery, Brisbane; Kiran Nadar Museum of Art, New Delhi, India; Museo Escultura Figurativa Internacional Contemporánea (MEFIC), Portugal; McClelland Gallery + Sculpture Park, Langwarrin; RMIT Gallery, Melbourne and Shepparton Art Museum, Shepparton, and private collections. His installation The Messenger is shown at the Hellenic Museum, Melbourne.

== Exhibitions ==
=== Solo exhibitions ===
Jinks has been the subject of over 15 solo exhibitions in Australia and Singapore.

=== Group exhibitions ===
Jinks has featured in over 20 group exhibitions. In 2014–2015, Jinks was exhibited alongside notable Australian artists including Ron Mueck, Patricia Piccinini and Jan Nelson at the National Portrait Gallery in Canberra. The artist's work was also exhibited in Frankfurt at the Liebieghaus Sculpture Museum. and in Korea and Hong Kong.

== Bibliography ==
Jinks and his work have been the subject of many Australian and international publications.
