= Veldhuizen (disambiguation) =

Veldhuizen may refer to:

- Veldhuizen, a hamlet, former municipality, and neighbourhood in the municipality of Utrecht, the Netherlands
- Veldhuizen (Drenthe), a hamlet
- Veldhuizen (Gelderland), a hamlet
- Veldhuizen (surname), a surname
  - Adriaan van Veldhuizen (1932–2013), Dutch politician
  - Willem van Veldhuizen (born 1954), Dutch painter
