= Gilles Esnault =

French figurative painter

Gilles Paul Esnault

Gilles Paul Esnault is a French figurative painter.

== Works ==
His multifaceted work comprises contemporary street scenes (motorcycles, mechanical details), in the style of the American hyperrealists. It also comprises genre paintings and landscapes as well as portraits more akin to the style of itinerant Russian realists (peredvizhniki) painters of the 19th century.

Exhibition at the salon des Indépendants – Espace Champerret – Paris April/May 2006 – "One second in Paris" 1.95×1.30 m (76 3/4 × 51 1/8 in) Exhibition Salon des artistes Indépendants de Paris 2008 – Espace Champerret 11–16 April 2008

== Exhibition ==
- Salon des Indépendants – Avril/mai 2006 PARIS

Exhibition Salon des artistes Indépendants de Paris 2008 – Espace Champerret 11–16 April 2008
