= Dragan Malešević Tapi =

Serbian painter (1949–2002)

- Драган Малешевић Тапи
- Born: 22 January 1949; Belgrade, SFR Yugoslavia
- Died: 29 October 2002 (aged 53); Belgrade, FR Yugoslavia
- Education: University of Belgrade
- Known for: Painting, drawing
- Movement: Hyperrealism
- Website: www.dmtapi.com

Dragan Malešević Tapi (Serbian Cyrillic: Драган Малешевић Тапи; 22 January 1949 – 29 October 2002) was a Serbian painter. Although by vocation an economist, he is generally considered one of the leading painters of Serbian hyperrealism style.

== Life ==
Dragan Malešević was born in Belgrade in 1949. In his early youth, he started painting as an autodidact. His painting career began when he was seven years old, in the lobby of the building located at 4 Hilandarska street in Belgrade. He copied the comic "Three Imps", which his father, a journalist, used to bring him from the "Politika" press, before the comic would appear in newsstands. Tickets for his first independent "exhibition", which took place at the entrance of his house building, cost five dinars for children and ten dinars for adults.

In 1985 his works, together with the works of Mića Popović and Olja Ivanjicki, were shown in public, at a group exhibition in Rovinj, where he continued to exhibit his works for the next five years.

The crucial moment for his painting career was the sale of some of his first paintings in the Prijeko Gallery in Dubrovnik in 1987. Tapi's first painting was sold to a German tourist for DM 8,000, although the artist at first asked 50,000 dollars for it. From that point forward, he aligned his life with his talent. After only two years, the magazine "Art News" would include him among the seven best hyperrealists in the world.

In the 80s and 90s his paintings engrossed great media attention, and that was followed by numerous independent and group exhibitions across his homeland and abroad: United States, Cuba, Belgium, France, United Kingdom, Germany, Switzerland, Greece, Cyprus, Bulgaria, Croatia, Montenegro, Macedonia, Russia, China, and Japan. Tapi's paintings are in numerous private collections, like the ones of former president of the United States, George H. W. Bush and state secretary Henry Kissinger; departed Prime minister of Japan Kakuei Tanaka, and many other public figures across the world, but also in public collections, including the White House collection. In 2000 the U.S. state of Georgia proclaimed Tapi an honorary citizen of Georgia. Unfortunately for the world of painting and admirers of fine arts, the sudden and early death of the artist in 2002 prevented him from exhibiting already arranged exhibitions in museums and galleries such as the Peggy Guggenheim Museum.

== Art ==
Modern art critics consider Dragan Malešević as a representative leader of hyperrealism and magical realism. Some art critics evaluate his painting as eclectic and illusionistic.

He painted oils on canvas and wood, and his use of techniques such as underpainting was similar to that of the old masters, especially Jan van Eyck and Salvador Dalí. As he painted only visible things, very precisely, he preserved the spirit of optimism and the joy of living. For some critics this is the specificity of Tapi's style.

However, his work embraces a much wider spectrum. Unlike his paintings, some of these artworks are yet unknown to the wider public, but he was engaged in sculpture in last years of his artistic production. Tapi's paintings dominate with scenes from everyday life, depicted with almost photographic precision. He also painted landscapes, genre compositions, still life, and female nudes. Some of his paintings have historical, religious or social motifs, with an admixture of the surreal.

Certainly, Tapi is one of the most famous and popular Serbian painters, with his paintings reaching staggering several hundreds of thousands of USD and his reproductions being sold worldwide. During his life he painted around a hundred paintings, including the most popular; Field of Happiness, Swans, Venezuela, 18th Hole, Garage, Spirit of Tesla, Anna Bach, A Turkey Fight, Rhodesia, Joy of Bankruptcy (on the cover of the compilation "Ima neka tajna veza" for the band Bijelo Dugme), Warm-Cold (on the cover of the compilation "Best of Oliver Mandić"), Žika's band (on the Goran Bregović CD cover "Music for movies"), Bliher, etc.

== Tapi and freemasonry ==
In the Serbian public sphere, in parallel with his art, Tapi carefully built his name as one of the most influential Freemasons in the country. In 1990, together with like-minded people, Tapi revitalized the Yugoslavian Grand Lodge, becoming one of the greatest public propagators of Freemasonry. When he died, he was a 33rd degree Mason, the acting Sovereign Grand Commander of the Supreme Council of Serbia, 33º Ancient and Accepted Scottish Rite of Freemasonry. After his sudden death, the Grand National Lodge of Serbia formed a new lodge, named, in his honor, "Dragan Malešević Tapi".

== Solo exhibitions ==
- 1989 Bor Museum.
- 1991 Yugoslavian Art Gallery, Belgrade.
- 1992 St. Stefan Gallery – Montenegro; Gallery Panorama, Niš; Museum of Vojvodina, Novi Sad; Gallery Scottish Rite, Los Angeles, United States; Milos Palace, Požarevac; Leonardo Gallery, Belgrade; Cafe Gallery "Dvorište", Belgrade.
- 1993 Herceg Novi; ICC Art Gallery Limassol, Cyprus.
- 1994 Hotel Vitosha, Sofia, Bulgaria; Cultural Center of Kotor; Cultural Center of Podgorica.
- 1995 Cafe Gallery, Kikinda; Gallery Renata, Sombor; Belgrade City Museum-Gallery, Belgrade.
- 1996 Exhibition of the painting "E, moj narode!" in Yugoslavian Art Gallery, Belgrade; National theater "Zoran Radmilović" - Zaječar;
- 1997 Art Gallery "Ruski Dom", Belgrade;
- 1999 Cultural Center of Skopje, Macedonia; St. Stefan Gallery – Montenegro.
- 2001 Museum of Vojvodina, Novi Sad; St. Stefan Gallery – Montenegro; "Grand" Hotel - Kopaonik.

== Group exhibitions ==
- 1986 Museum in Rovinj
- 1987 Gallery Studio 57-Prijeko, Dubrovnik;
- 1989 Keith Green Gallery, Park Avenue, New York City
- 1990 Gallery Leonardo, Belgrade.
- 1992 Gallery Rose, Belgrade.
- 1994 Gallery "Picasso", Pančevo; "City" Gallery, Belgrade.
- 1995 Gallery "Picasso", Pančevo.
- 1996 Yugoslavian Art Gallery, Belgrade; Belgrade Museum of Contemporary Art, the exhibition „Nikola Tesla“, pavilion Cvijeta Zuzorić, Belgrade.
- 2000 Yugoslavian Art Gallery, Belgrade.
