= John De Andrea =

American sculptor

- Born: November 24, 1941 (age 84); Denver, Colorado, U.S.
- Education: University of Colorado Boulder (BFA); University of New Mexico
- Known for: Realistic sculptures of human figures
- Movement: Photorealism, hyperrealism, verism and superrealism

John De Andrea (born November 24, 1941) is an American sculptor known for his realistic sculptures of human figures, dressed or nude and in true-to-life postures.

== Life ==
De Andrea was born in Denver, Colorado, on November 24, 1941. He received his Bachelor of Fine Arts from the University of Colorado at Boulder and studied at the University of New Mexico in Albuquerque on an art scholarship, 1966–8. He lives in Denver.

== Work and themes ==
De Andrea is an artistic representative of Hyperrealism and the Hyperrealism school of art, and specializes in nudes, frequently lovers, which he makes from plastic, polyester, glass fiber with natural hair and painted after naturalistic gypsum castings. His work is often associated with that of Duane Hanson and George Segal.

In documenta 5 in Kassel 1972, he presented Arden Andersen and Nora Murphy, a hyper-realistic sculpture of a couple in the act of love-making, made from bodycasts rendered in polyester resin.

This alienation between the lovers and their incurable misfortune becomes even clearer with his 1978 work on display in Aachen, entitled The Couple. The man is not only fully dressed and the woman naked, but she clings to him, while he touches her only minimally, in order to not induce an open rejection.

De Andrea's works based on the sculptor and his model are characterized by a sober, professional relationship between the man and the woman; the artist concentrates on his work or rather is shown in situations, where he withdraws within himself to a meditative posture, and retreats into himself, in order to collect his energy and concentration for further work.

== Public collections ==
De Andrea's work is included in numerous permanent collections, including:

- Metropolitan Museum of Art,
- Museum Ludwig in Aachen and Cologne, Germany.
- Portland Museum of Art,
- Herbert F. Johnson Museum of Art, and
- Denver Art Museum.

== See also ==
- Duane Hanson
- Ron Mueck
- George Segal
