= Dennis Wojtkiewicz =

American painter

- Born: 1956 (age 69–70); Chicago, Illinois
- Known for: Painting
- Notable work: Art
- Movement: Hyperrealism

Dennis Wojtkiewicz (born 1956) is an American Hyperrealist painter and draughtsman.

Wojtkiewicz graduated from Southern Illinois University and is an artist associated with the Hyperrealist movement. He is best known for his large scale renderings of sliced fruit and flowers. Wojtkiewicz relies on traditional oil paint and pastels for his drawings.

Dennis Wojtkeiwicz's work is exhibited in leading fine art galleries from across the world. His work is owned by many leading private, corporate and public collections including the Evanston Museum of Art, Fidelity Investments in Boston and the University of South Dakota.

== Selected solo exhibitions ==
- 2000: M.A. Doran Gallery, Tulsa, OK
- 2006: J. Cacciola Gallery, New York, NY
- 2009: Peterson-Cody Gallery, Santa fe, NM
- 2012: Art Revolution Taipei International Art Fair, Taipei World Trade Center, Taipei, Taiwan
- 2012: Peterson-Cody Gallery, Santa Fe, NM
- 2014: Sugarman Peterson Gallery, Santa Fe, NM
