= Tjalf Sparnaay =

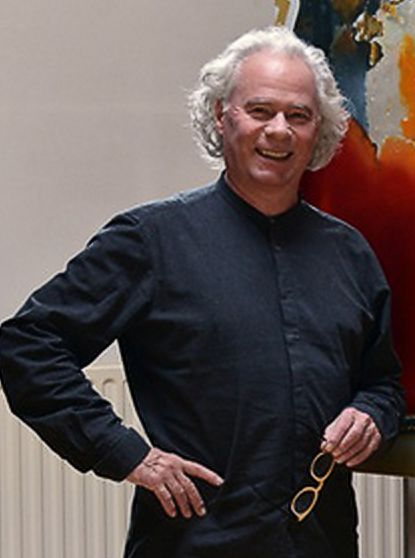
Tjalf Sparnaay, 2014

Tjalf Sparnaay (born 1954) is a Dutch artist, photographer, illustrator and painter. Born in Haarlem, Tjalf lived with his parents for much of his younger years. Sparnaay was educated to become a sports teacher and became a selftaught painter and amateur photographer from about 1980. Before becoming an established artist, Sparnaay made postcards to earn money. Tjalf Sparnaay once lived in Drenthe, and later moved to Hilversum. He calls himself a painter and businessman.

== Exhibitions ==
Sparnaay exhibits in the Netherlands, the United States and England. His paintings have sold for over $55,000. His original works are exhibited and sold by art dealers in three countries: Bernarducci Meisel Gallery in New York, PlusOne Gallery in London, and at Mark Peet Visser Gallery in the Netherlands.

Sparnaay exhibited in various art galleries, such as the Meisel (from 2013), OK Harris Works of Art, New York (from 2002 until 2012), Plus One Gallery, London (from 2006 until 2014), and Smelik and Stokking Gallery, The Hague (1994).

In 2015, a solo-exhibition with 50 works, painted between 1998 and 2014 took place in Museum de Fundatie in Zwolle.

== Selected publications ==
- Ralph Keuning, Ronald Hans Anton Plasterk, Jan Six. Closer. The mega realism of Tjalf Sparnaay, Exhibition catalogue, 2015, ISBN 978 94 6262 017 9
