= ENAC =

ENAC may refer to:

- École nationale de l'aviation civile - the French civil aviation university
- Epithelial sodium channel (ENaC)
- Ente Nazionale per l'Aviazione Civile - Italian Civil Aviation Authority
- Faculté de l'environnement naturel, architectural et construit à l'EPFL - School of Architecture, Civil and Environmental Engineering at EPFL
