= Duane Hanson =

American sculptor (1925–1996)

- Duane Hanson
- Born: Duane Elwood Hanson; January 17, 1925; Alexandria, Minnesota, U.S.
- Died: January 6, 1996 (aged 70); Boca Raton, Florida, U.S.
- Education: BA, 1946, Macalester College, Saint Paul, Minnesota; MFA, 1951, Cranbrook Academy of Art, Bloomfield Hills, Michigan
- Known for: Sculpture
- Movement: Photorealism, hyperrealism

Duane Hanson (January 17, 1925 – January 6, 1996) was an American artist and sculptor born in Minnesota. He spent most of his career in South Florida. He was known for his life-sized realistic sculptures of people. He cast the works based on human models in various materials, including polyester resin, fiberglass, Bondo, and bronze. His sculptures often provided political-social commentary and satire.

Hanson's works are in the permanent collections of The Whitney Museum of American Art, The San Francisco Museum of Modern Art, and The Smithsonian.

== Education ==
Duane Elwood Hanson was born January 17, 1925, in Alexandria, Minnesota. After attendance at Luther College and the University of Washington, he graduated from Macalester College in 1946. Following a period where he taught high school art, he received a Master of Fine Arts degree from the Cranbrook Academy of Art in Bloomfield Hills in 1951.

== Career and style ==
Around 1966 Hanson began making figural casts using fiberglass and vinyl. Works that first brought him to notice were of figures grouped in tableaux, some depicting brutal and violent subjects. Hanson's Abortion (1966) was inspired by the horrors of an illicit backroom procedure, and Accident (1967) showed a motorcycle crash. Race Riot (1969–1971) included among its seven figures a white policeman terrorizing an African American man as well as an African American rioter attacking the policeman. Other works which dealt with physical violence or other explosive social issues of the 1960s were Riot (1967), Football Players (1969), and Vietnam Scene (1969).

These sculptures, cast from actual people, were painted to make the revealed skin look realistic, replete with veins and blemishes. Hanson then clothed the figures with garments from second-hand clothing stores or from the person who modeled for him. Clearly, these works contained strong social comment, and can be seen as modern parallels to the concerns of 19th-century French Realists such as Honoré Daumier and Jean-François Millet, artists Hanson admired.

Few of Hanson's early sculptures would survive because he later destroyed many of them, preferring to be known for his more mature style.

Around 1970, Hanson abandoned gut-wrenching scenes for more subtle, though no less vivid ones. In that year he made the Supermarket Shopper, Hardhat, and Tourists; Woman Eating was completed in 1971. These were also life-sized, clothed, fiberglass figures. Unlike the earlier works, however, these were single or paired figures, and not overtly engaged in violent activity. Instead, his figures often had a listless, bored look, staring into the distance and disengaged from their surroundings.

In 1967, art dealer Ivan Karp attempted to persuade Hanson to move from South Florida to New York City, and the artist moved to Manhattan in 1969, residing on The Bowery (Bleecker Street) across the street from CBGB. However, in 1973, Hanson moved to Davie, Florida, where he would spend the remainder of his life.

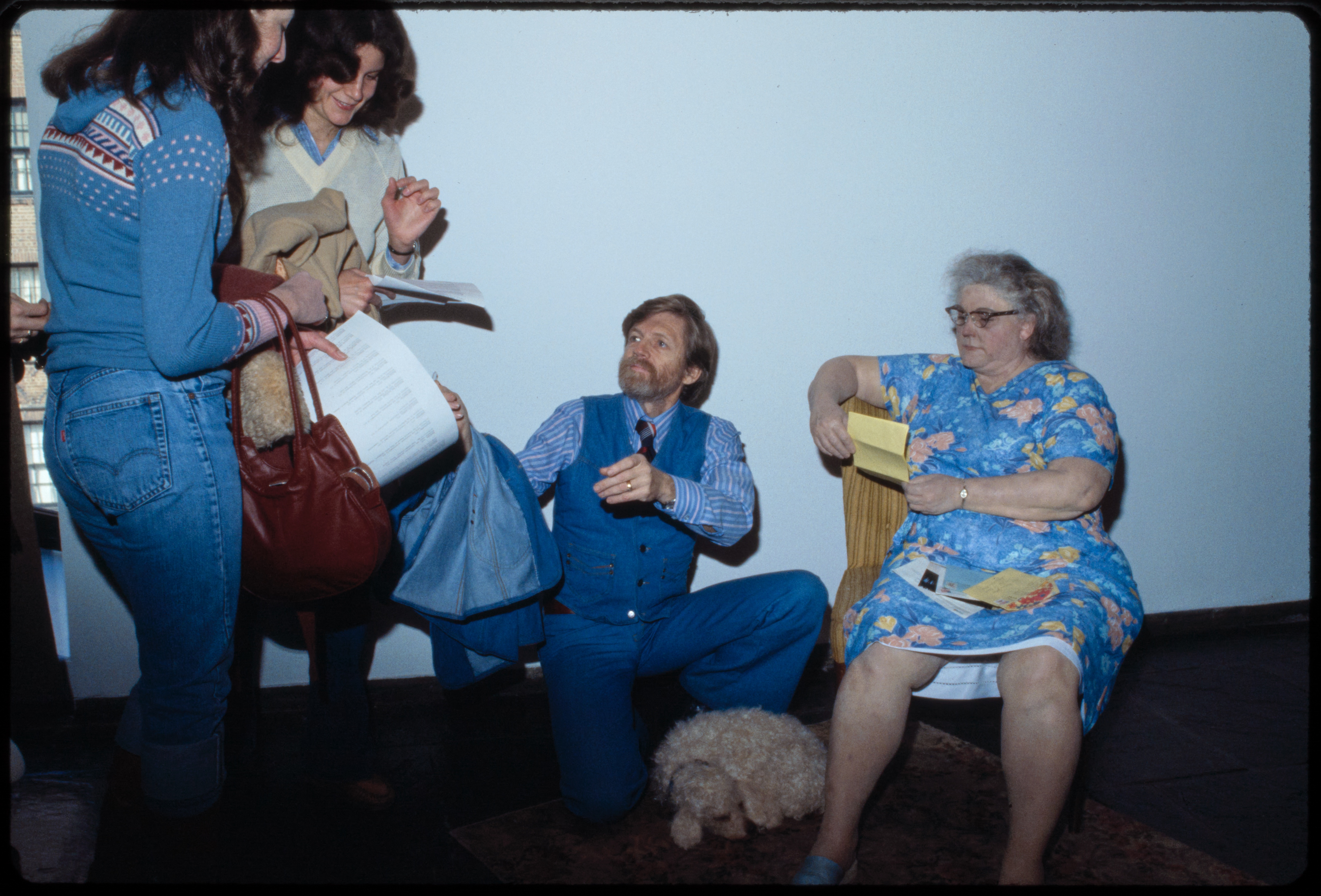
Hanson with his sculpture at the Whitney Museum

While the earlier works tended to be more contained spatially, the later figures had no clearly defined boundaries separating them from the viewer. They quite literally inhabited the viewer's space—with amusing results at times, as in the cases of Reading Man (1977) or Photographer (1978). Hanson sometimes would cast his own children in his work, as in Cheerleader (1988), and Surfer (1987).

In 2018, two of Hanson's works were exhibited at the Met Breuer in the show "Like Life", which New York Times critic Roberta Smith reviewed, stating "[the show] juxtaposes figurative sculptures throughout time. On view was Hanson's hyper-realistic “Housepainter II” (1984), and “Hermes,” attributed to Polykleitos (A.D. first or second century). Mr. Hanson's sculpture of a black man whitewashing a brown wall underscores the curators’ point that ancient marbles were originally brightly colored — and that the whiteness of Classical art is a fiction that has “colored” the Western view of perfection."

Peter Schjeldahl noted, in his March 2018 article for The New Yorker about the show "Like Life", "his (Hanson's) hyperrealistic tableaux, starring a frowsy working-class housewife and a weary housepainter, curiously become ever more affecting as their period looks recede in time."

The Estate of Duane Hanson is represented by Gagosian Gallery.

== Death ==
Hanson died of non-Hodgkin lymphoma in a hospital in Boca Raton, Florida, 11 days before his 71st birthday.

== Exhibitions ==
Selected solo exhibitions of Hanson's work include

- Louisiana Museum of Modern Art, Humlebæk, Denmark (1975)
- Berlin Artist Programme Akademie der Künste (1975)
- Des Moines Art Center, Iowa (1977)
- Corcoran Gallery of Art, Washington, D.C. (1978)
- Whitney Museum of American Art, New York (1978)
- Orlando International Airport, Orlando (1986) - The Traveler
- Fort Lauderdale - Hollywood International Airport, Fort Lauderdale (1990) – Vendor with a Walkman
- KunstHausWien, Vienna (1992)
- Montreal Museum of Fine Arts, Canada (1994, traveled to Modern Art Museum of Fort Worth, Texas)
- Daimaru Museum of Art, Tokyo (1995, traveled to Genichiro-Inkuma Museum of Contemporary Art, Kagawa; and Kintetsu Museum of Art, Osaka)

Posthumous exhibitions:

- Saatchi Gallery, London (1997)
- "Duane Hanson, A Survey of his Work from the 30s to the 90s," Museum of Art, Fort Lauderdale(1998, traveled to Flint Institute of Arts, Michigan; Whitney Museum of American Art, New York; and Memphis Brooks Museum of Art, Memphis)
- "Duane Hanson: More than Reality, 2001,” Schirn Kunsthalle, Frankfurt (2001, traveled to Padiglione d'Arte Contemporanea, Milan; Kunsthal, Rotterdam; National Galleries of Scotland, Edinburgh; and Kunsthaus Zürich).
- "Duane Hanson" at the Serpentine Galleries, London, UK (2015). Crystal Bridges Museum of American Art, Bentonville, AR (2016)

== Collections ==
Woman Eating (1971), polyester resin, fiberglass, polychromed in oil paint with clothes, table, chair and accessories (life-sized), Smithsonian American Art Museum

The following collections hold sculptures by Duane Hanson:

- Whitney Museum of American Art, New York, New York
- San Francisco Museum of Modern Art, San Francisco, California
- Corcoran Gallery of Art, Washington, D.C.
- Cranbrook Art Museum, Bloomfield Hills, Michigan
- Flint Institute of Arts, Flint, Michigan
- Hunter Museum of American Art, Chattanooga, Tennessee
- Iris & B. Gerald Cantor Center for Visual Arts, Stanford University in Palo Alto, California
- Kresge Art Museum, Michigan State University, East Lansing, Michigan
- Lowe Art Museum, University of Miami, Coral Gables, Florida
- Milwaukee Art Museum, Milwaukee, Wisconsin
- Museum Ludwig, Cologne Germany
- Nelson-Atkins Museum of Art, Kansas City, Missouri
- Pennsylvania Academy of the Fine Arts, Philadelphia, Pennsylvania
- Saatchi Gallery, London, England
- St. Louis Art Museum, St. Louis, Missouri
- Scottish National Gallery of Modern Art, Edinburgh, Scotland
- Smithsonian American Art Museum, Washington, D.C.
- Toledo Museum of Art, Toledo, Ohio
- Wadsworth Atheneum, Hartford, Connecticut
- Yale University Art Gallery, New Haven, Connecticut

== See also ==
- John De Andrea
- Hyperrealism (painting) and sculpture
- Ron Mueck
- Photorealism
- George Segal
- Simulacrum
