= Jerry Ott =

American artist (born 1947)

Jerry Duane Ott (born 1947) is an American artist.

== Artistic career ==
Ott's work includes photorealism, airbrush, and paint. He works in two and three dimensions and in sizes from a few inches wide to more than five feet tall and eight feet long.

Two of Ott's works are in the collection of the Walker Art Center.
