= Oscar Ukonu =

Nigerian ballpoint pen artist

- Born: 1993 (age 32–33)
- Education: The Federal Polytechnic, Owerri
- Known for: Hyperrealistic Portraits
- Movement: Hyperrealism
- Website: https://www.oscarukonu.com

Oscar Ukonu (born 1993) is a Nigerian ballpoint pen artist based in Lagos, Nigeria. He is known for his hyperrealist portraits.

== Early life and education ==
Ukonu was born in 1993. He began drawing, as a hobby, when he was nine. He studied architecture at Federal Polytechnic in Nekede, Nigeria.

== Art ==
While studying architecture, he drew a lot of pencil-based drawings followed by experimenting with rapidograph ink pens to develop his own art style. In 2014, after spending a considerable time looking at different mediums and drawing tools, he chose the ballpoint pen to produce his photorealistic works. His work is described as hyperrealism and Afrorealism. He uses his hyperreal illustrations as a medium for social critique, as well as to convey a social message about the African descent. According to himself, he "constantly explores Black identity and pride in an increasingly globalized world, as well as ideas surrounding Afrorealism."

An artwork can take him up six weeks, during which he will use about ten pens due to wear and tear on the nib. For such a work, he will use about 20 photos he's taken of the subject for reference. He employs three basic techniques in his artworks: hatching, crosshatching, and scribbling.

In 2020, his submission Blue Boy was placed 6th in Société Bic's BIC Art Master competition.
