= Joseph Canger =

American artist (born 1956)

Joseph Canger (born 1956, Saugerties, New York) is an American contemporary artist.

== Biography ==
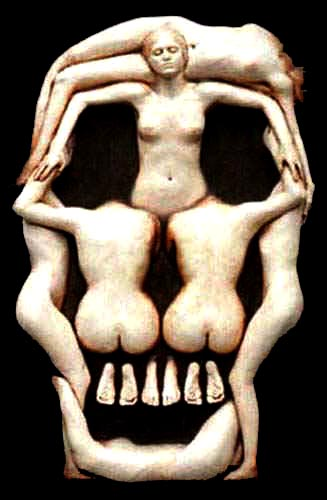
Canger's Dali Skull, a life cast sculpture in the style of Salvador Dalí's "In Voluptas Mors"

Canger began his art career as a painter, painting portraits for classic rockers like Leon Russell. He later became a lifecaster, creating sculptures for punk rocker Iggy Pop and funk rockers Johanna Stahley and Spredhaus.

Canger graduated from the Newark School of Fine and Industrial Arts in 1982, where he studied realistic drawing under instructor Leo Dee. His artwork was displayed at the Newark Museum as a part of NSFIA's Centennial Show. Canger later earned his degree in The Arts from the State University of New York, where he studied hyper-realism in sculpture.

Canger's Dali Skull sculpture is displayed in the Fine Art Gallery of the International Life Cast Museum in Boston, Massachusetts. It was created in 2005 and is made of painted fiberglass-filled plaster on wood.

Playboy Playmate Helena Antonaccio appeared in Playboy Magazine standing beside her sculpture created by Canger, and Playboy model Michelle Diamond was featured with Canger in a life-casting segment for "The Living Edge" television show.

In 2005, Canger received an International Humanitarian Award from the Association of Lifecasters International and received a second ALI award the following year in the "Most Outrageous" category.

== Religious reflection ==
The Center for Worship Resourcing from the Methodist General Board of Discipleship offers "Worship Planning Helps" to help engage thought-provoking dialectic within their congregations. They explored suffering using art as a source of reflection. "Guernica" by Pablo Picasso was the featured painting, but they also found Canger's work to be even more provocative and disturbing. "Labor Pains", by Canger, is very physical and graphic. The GBOD felt it might be useful and provocative if the people were up to engaging art of this intensity.

Canger's work has found a home in various churches regardless of domination. Whether they are traditional religious paintings and stained-glass windows or his unorthodox sculptures, his art is appreciated for its unique spiritual message.
