= Carole Feuerman =

American sculptor

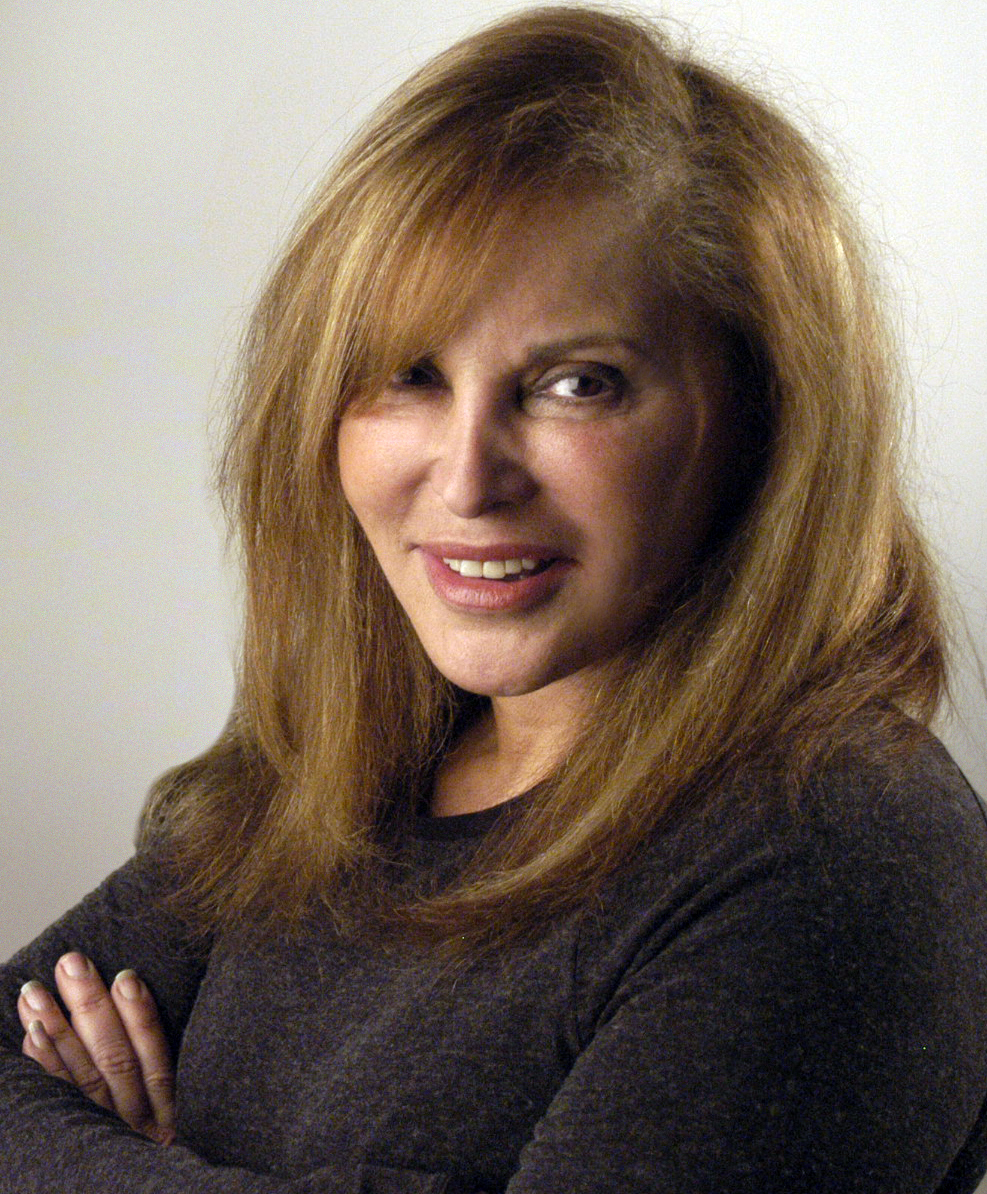
- Carole Feuerman
- Born: Carole Ackerman; September 21, 1945 (age 81); Hartford, Connecticut
- Education: School of Visual Arts, Hofstra University, Temple University
- Known for: sculpture, installation art, painting, drawing, video art
- Movement: Hyperrealism Superrealism
- Website: carolefeuerman.com

Carole A. Feuerman (born 1945) is an American sculptor and artist working in hyperrealism. Feuerman utilizes a variety of media including resin, marble, and bronze. She has been included in exhibitions at the Smithsonian Institution's National Portrait Gallery; and Palazzo Strozzi in Florence, Italy.

== Life and work ==
=== Early life ===
Feuerman attended the School of Visual Arts in New York City, where she found work as an illustrator. She provided an illustration for The New York Times, and created album covers for Alice Cooper and the Rolling Stones. She made the cover image for the November 1975 issue of National Lampoon magazine.

=== Public works ===
In 1981, Feuerman was chosen by a jury at the Heckscher Museum on Long Island. She exhibited her works at Fordham University and was chosen to participate in the Learning through Arts Program conducted by the Guggenheim Museum.

In 1989, Feuerman began to work her first big marketing campaign with Absolut Vodka. Since Sweden did not allow the advertising of alcohol, Absolut Vodka's marketing plan was to push advertising in other areas of the world. Feuerman created life-sized figures within a glass display which were paraded in trucks on the streets of Los Angeles and Manhattan.

In 2008, Feuerman was commissioned by artist Seward Johnson and the Sculpture Foundation to create a painted bronze sculpture installation for the permanent collection of Grounds for Sculpture.

In May 2012, Feuerman unveiled her monumental sculpture Survival of Serena in painted bronze with New York City's Department of Parks and Recreation. Its resin sister debuted at the Venice Biennale in 2007. The new Survival of Serena is the first of a series of painted bronze sculptures by the artist designed specifically for outdoor placement. The bronze sculpture was installed in Petrosino Square through September before traveling to the Boca Raton Beach Resort in Florida. In 2012, Feuerman's Quan, a painted bronze sculpture of a woman balancing atop a ball of polished stainless steel, was featured at the Frederik Meijer Gardens & Sculpture Park in Grand Rapids, Michigan as part of the group show Body Double: The Figure in Contemporary Sculpture.

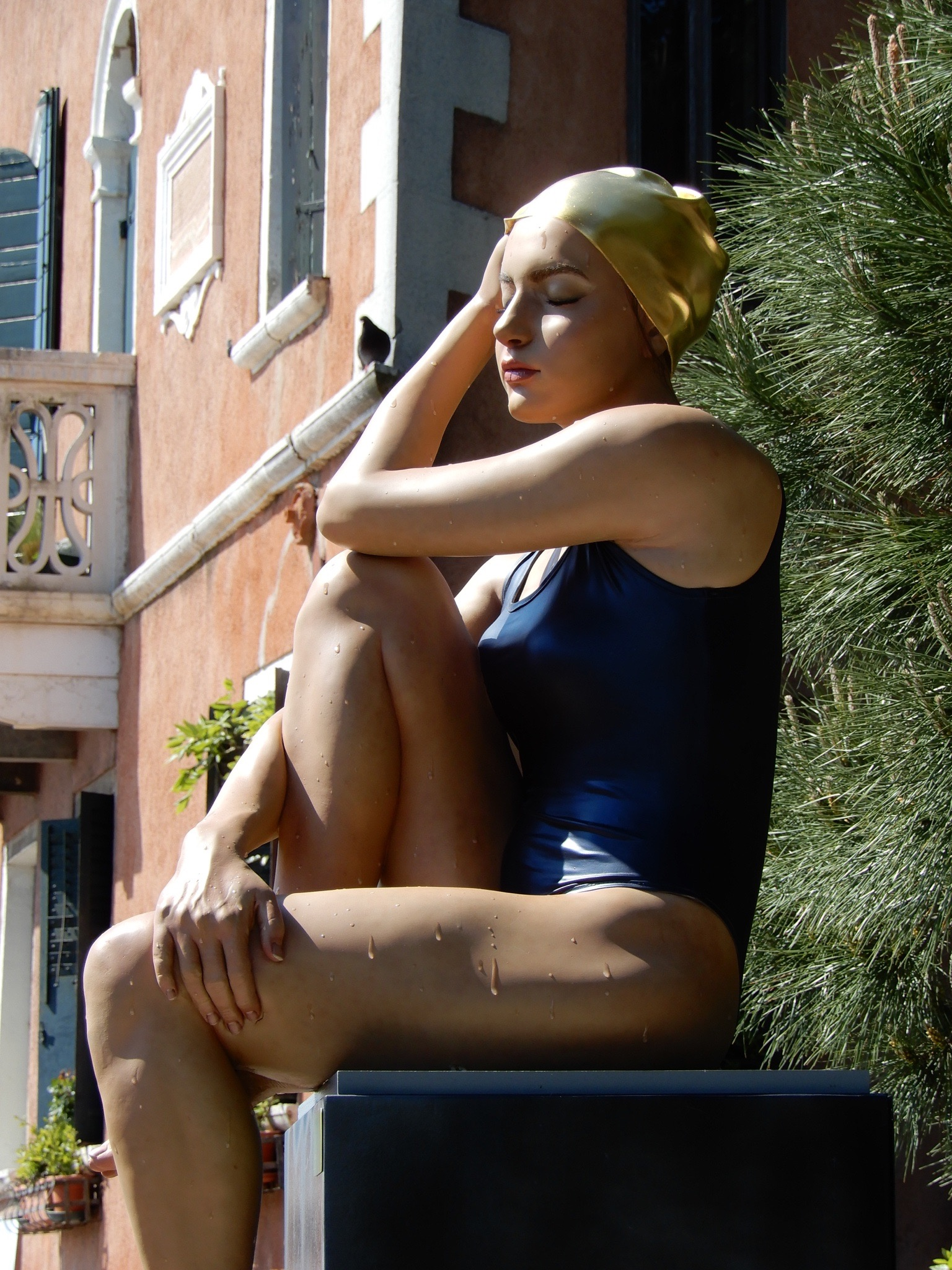
Hyperrealistic sculpture The Midpoint, at the 2017 Venice Biennale

A 16-foot (4.9 m) bronze diver entitled The Golden Mean at Riverfront Green Park with Hudson Valley Center for Contemporary Art in Peekskill, New York was unveiled in September 2012. A video documentary on the five-year creation of the work has been posted online. In 2013, The City of Peekskill announced the acquisition of the sculpture as a permanent monument to the town. A second diver was created for her spring 2013 solo exhibition at Jim Kempner Fine Art also titled The Golden Mean, where it was on display in the outdoor sculpture garden through the summer and then moved to an 8-piece outdoor sculpture exhibition at Mana Contemporary in Jersey City. The monumental model used to create the bronze was installed at the 2013 Venice Biennale.

In May 2014, NetApp unveiled a new commission by Feuerman titled Double Diver, gifted to the City of Sunnyvale, California. The sculpture is 2½ tons of bronze and steel balancing on two 6-inch wrists.

In 2015, Feuerman had solo exhibitions in Florence, Hong Kong, Frankfurt, Korea, New York, Miami, and Chicago. She was part of a group show Love at the Hudson Valley Center for Contemporary Art. Two of her sculptures, DurgaMa and Leda and the Swan, were included in the 2015 Venice Biennale at Palazzo Mora.

In 2017, the Global Art Affairs Foundation organized a solo show honoring Feuerman entitled Personal Structures – Open Borders, one of many exhibitions surrounding the Venice Biennale, where Feuerman has had a presence for decades.

In the summer of 2018, Feuerman had a solo exhibition in Knokke-Heist, Belgium, as part of the 25th Edition of Sculpture Link. The exhibition featured eleven of her outdoor public works including the sculpture entitled "The Midpoint".

In June of 2026, eight sculptures were installed along Michigan Avenue in Chicago as an outdoor exhibition called Monuments of Stillness, presented by Hilton Contemporary Gallery of Chicago. Two more will join them and all will remain until November 15, 2026. The gallery is also hosting a simultaneous exhibition of smaller works.

== Awards ==
- Charles D. Murphy Sculpture Award in 1981. In 1982, she received the Amelia Peabody Award for Sculpture.
- Medici Award from the City of Florence at the Florence Biennale in 2005 and First Prize in the 2008 Olympic Fine Arts Exhibition in Beijing.
- Gold List: Top Contemporary Artists of Today - 4th Edition, Int. Art Market Magazine, Tel Aviv, 2019
- Lifetime Achievement Award from the International Sculpture Center (ISC) in 2026.
