= Willem van Veldhuizen =

Dutch painter (born 1954)

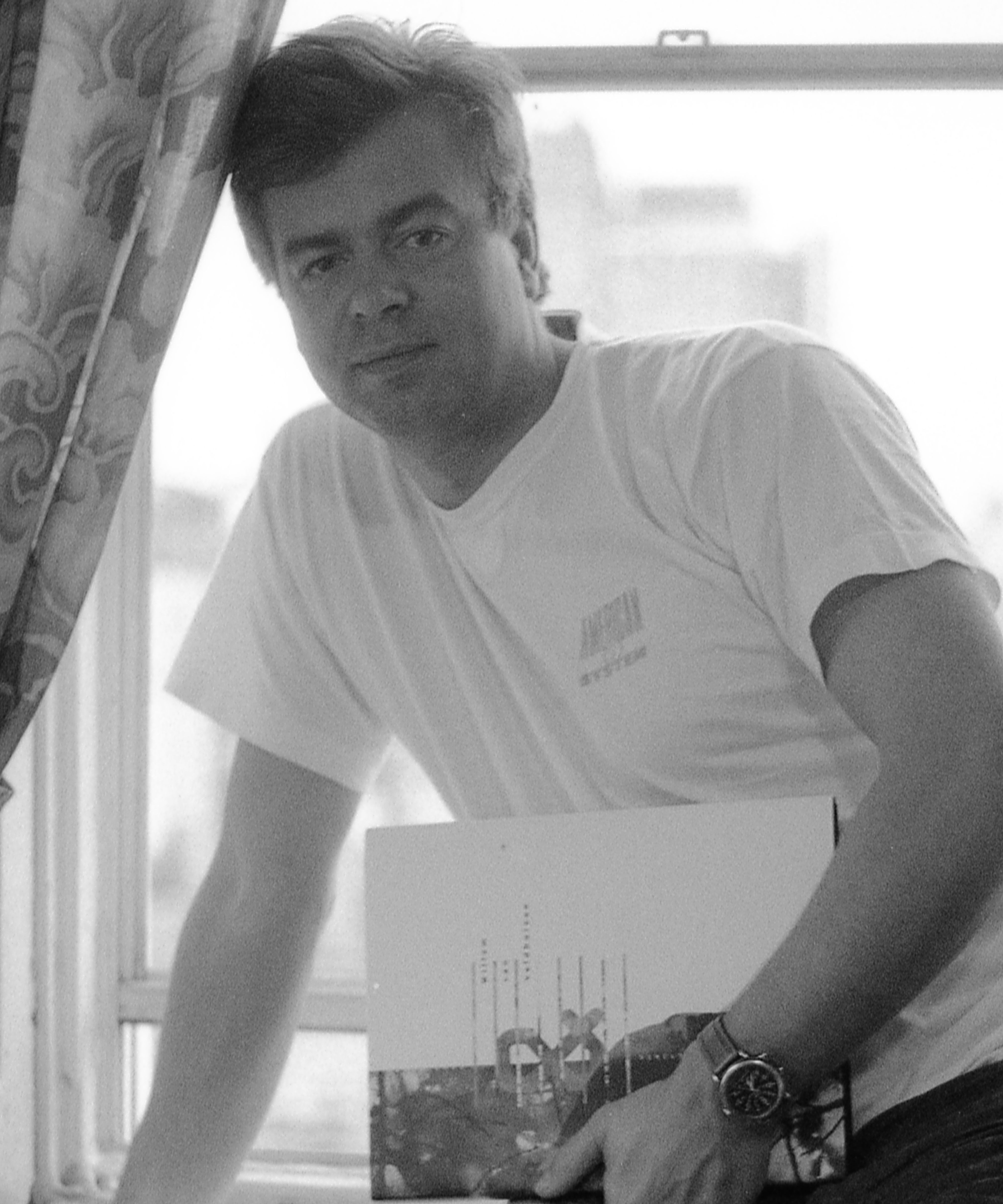
- Willem van Veldhuizen, New York City, 1992
- Born: January 13, 1954; Rotterdam
- Died: June 13, 2025; Rotterdam
- Known for: Painting
- Movement: Hyperrealism
- Awards: 1978 Bronze medal European prize for the Art of painting - Karel Klinkenbergprize for Art of drawing - Royal Subsidy for painting

Willem van Veldhuizen (born January 13, 1954, in Rotterdam, Netherlands) was a Dutch painter, known for his photorealism and hyperrealism paintings of his museum interiors.

== Life and work ==
Willem van Veldhuizen was born in Rotterdam, the Netherlands, and took his studies at the Willem de Kooning Academy from 1972 to 1977 together with artists like Frank Dam, Jos Looise, and Anton Vrede. His work is influenced by classical masters like the 17th century Dutch painter of church interiors Pieter Jansz Saenredam, with whom he shares a preference for sacred rooms, tranquility and colors in harmonizing tones, and by classic-modern masters like Mark Rothko.

The composition of his paintings are composed according to an established pattern: "The upper, narrow part of the canvas shows the back wall or a glass wall through which a garden is visible. A large floor area holds a prominent place. The reality of the building or the world outside is reflected in the floors" The floor area is builds up the according to a special technique: "After the undercoat has been applied and the shadows have been put in, he 'splats' the paint against the canvas: color over color, layer on top of layer - making subtle distinctions in light and dark against the back wall".

In the paintings of his museum interiors, Van Veldhuizen quotes his favorites in art, among others Michelangelo, Picasso, Man Ray, Barnett Newman, Gerrit Rietveld and Le Corbusier.

== Publications ==
- Willem van Veldhuizen (1991). Willem van Veldhuizen: tekeningen & schilderijen. ISBN 90-900457-5-9
- Willem van Veldhuizen & Loek Brons (2001). Willem van Veldhuizen, 1991-2001: tien jaar bij drs. Loek Brons., Van Spijk Art Projects, 2001. ISBN 90-6216-726-8
- Willem van Veldhuizen (2002). Les filles d'atelier. W. Pijbes (inl.) Kunsthal, 2002. ISBN 90-400-8682-6
