= Zharko Basheski =

Macedonian artist

- Born: 11 August 1957 (age 68); Prilep, PR Macedonia, FPR Yugoslavia
- Education: Faculty of Fine Arts in Skopje (BFA and MFA)
- Known for: Sculptor
- Movement: Hyperrealism
- Website: www.zharkobasheski.com

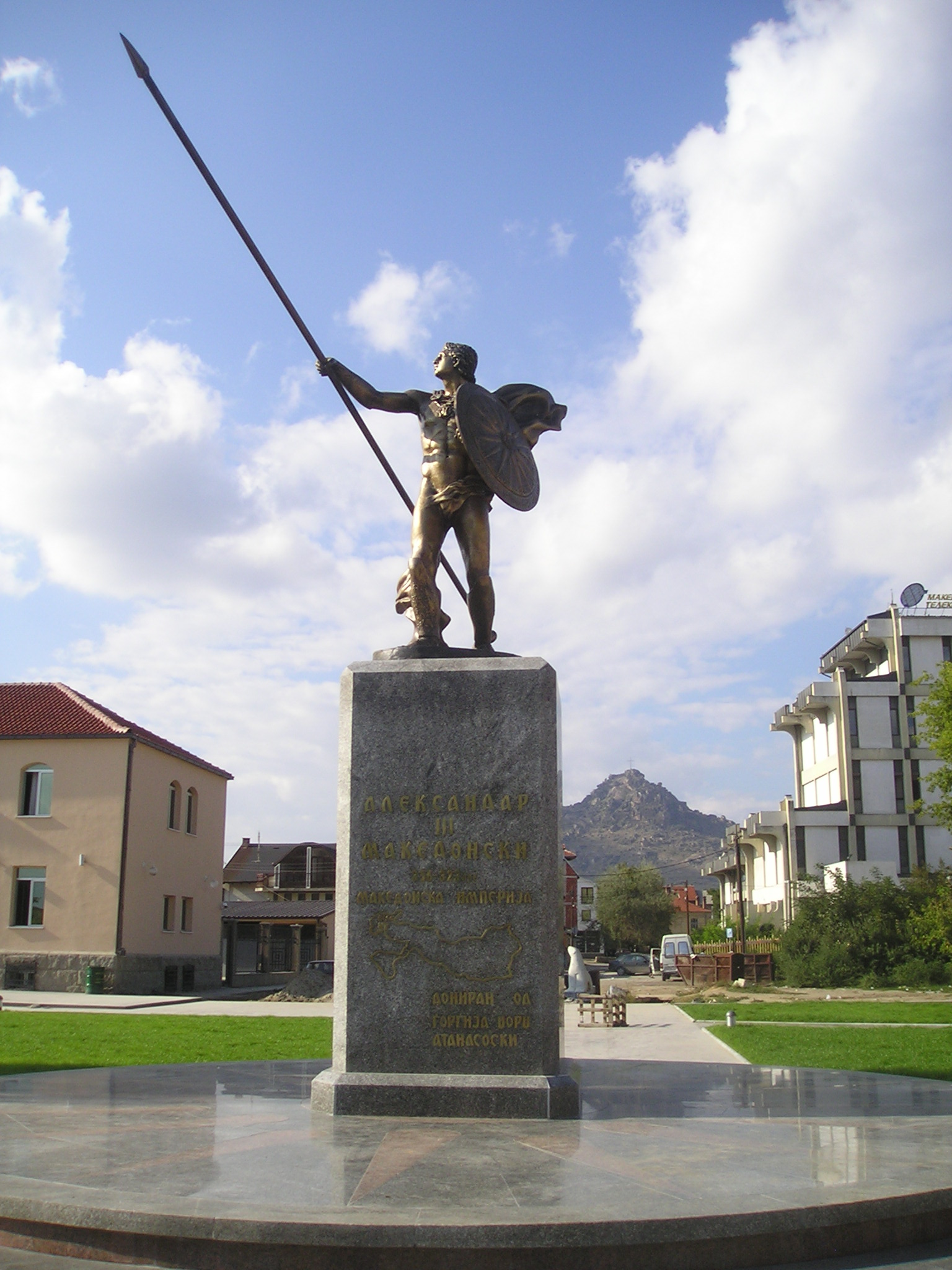
Bronze monument of Alexander the Great located in the city of Prilep, Republic of Macedonia. The modern sculpture was created by Zarko Basheski.

Zharko Basheski (Macedonian: Жарко Башески) (born 11 August 1957) is a Macedonian sculptor and professor in the Sculpture Department at the Faculty of Fine Arts in Skopje. His work falls under the hyperrealism movement, with a specific focus on the human body.

== Life and work ==
Basheski was born on 11 August 1957 in Prilep, Republic of Macedonia, then part of SFR Yugoslavia. In 1988, he graduated at the Faculty of Fine Arts in Skopje in the class of Petar Hadzi Boskov. Ten years later, in 1998, he acquired his MFA degree at the same institution in the class of Dragan Popovski - Dada. He is member of DLUM (Macedonian Artists Association) since 1988. From 1999 to 2009 he was head of Department of Sculpture at the Faculty of Fine Arts. His work has been presented at several international exhibitions and he has been the recipient of numerous awards. Much of his work is in private collections in the Republic of Macedonia and in foreign countries. Currently he is a member of the National Board for Accreditation and Evaluation, the Senate of the Ss. Cyril and Methodius University of Skopje and the Inter-University conference.

The interest in his work is turned towards the human, hence the interest in hyperrealistic approach in shaping the concept of the work, which in the theoretical projection exceeds hyperrealism, talks about life and the world in which we live. In his work there are several elements which are new to the world of sculpture and that make his latest work different: the concept, contemporary views of human condition through self-observation, technical production and use of new materials (resin polyester, polymarble, silicone, natural hair), the hyper-realistic treatment, size of the work, the philosophical approach – all of which, when combined in one, offer a multilayered reading of the artwork.

== Solo exhibitions ==
- 2018 "Asphyxia" Cultural Institution Delavski dom Trbovlje, Slovenia
- 2018 "Asphyxia", Multimedia Centre Kibla, Maribor, Skopje, Macedonia
- 2017 "Asphyxia", Nano Bar, "Museum Debar Maalo", Skopje, Macedonia
- 2017 Maribor, Slovenia at KIBLA PORTAL
- 2016 Skopje, National Gallery, Ordinary Human
- 2015 Paris, at Gallery Helene Nougaro, "Adam And Eve – Eternal Resumption"
- 2014 Cetinje, at Gallery of Art of Montenegro "Miodrag Dado Đurić exhibition "Behind the Look"
- 2014 Sofia, at Gallery Paris Moscow, exhibition Transformation
- 2013 Nuremberg, at Bunsen Goetz Galerie
- 2012 Paris, at Cité internationale des arts exhibition "Behind the Look"
- 2011 Venice Biennale, exhibition Leap
- 2010 Ohrid, Centre of Culture " Grigor Prlicev "
- 2010 Prilep, Art Gallery – Culture Center " Marko Cepenkov "
- 2010 Skopje, Culture and Information Center
- 2010 New York City, Galleru MC
- 2004 Skopje, Sculptures, Museum of the City of Skopje
- 1998 Skopje Sculpture-Temple Hram, Museum of Contemporary Art-Skopje
- 1997 Skopje, Art Gallery – Daut Pasha Amam – Skopje
- 1994 Skopje, Culture and Information Center
- 1993 Bitola, Art Gallery
- 1993 Prilep, Art Gallery – Culture Center "Marko Cepenkov"
- 1984 Prilep, Art Gallery – Culture Center "Marko Cepenkov"

== Group exhibition (selection) ==
- 2018 "50 years of Hyperrealistic Sculpture", Kunsthale, Rotterdam, Netherlands
- 2017 National Gallery of Australia, Canberra, Australia "50 years of Hyper realistic Sculpture"
- 2017 Ferenczy Muzeumi Centrum, Budapest, Hungary "MIG 21"
- 2017 KIC, Skopje, Macedonia "Femine/II"
- 2017 Copenhagen, Arken Museum, GOSH! IS IT ALIVE?
- 2016 Monterei Mexico, Museo de arte contemporaneo "50 years of Hyper realistic Sculpture"
- 2016 Bilbao Spain, Museo de Bellas Artes de Bilbao, "50 years of Hyper realistic Sculpture"
- 2015 Dox, Prague, "Brave New World"
- 2015 Riga, Latvia, "My Heart Is A Tiger"
- 2014 Skopje, National Gallery of Macedonia, "Paris je t'aime"
- 2012 "Malta Arts Festival 2012"
- 2011 35th Anniversary of Museum of Contemporary Art of Macedonia
- 2008 Skopje, Refresh Yourself, Macedonia Square, Museum of the City of Skopje
- 2008 Bari(Italy), Presentation of the Macedonian Culture
- 2005 New York (USA), Gallery MC
- 2004 Skopje, Exhibition from the Collection of the City Assembly Skopje
- Skopje, DLUM Annual Exhibition
- 2003 Skopje, Portrait, DLUM
- 1998 Skopje, Winter Salon, Art Gallery
- 1997 Skopje, Winter Salon, Art Gallery
- Skopje, HARFA Gallery
- 1996 Skopje, Installation, Chifte Amam
- Skopje, House of ARM
- G. Milanovac (SCG), IV International Biennail of Miniature Art
- Skopje, Winter Salon, Art Gallery
- 1995 Istanbul, (Turkey)
- Fayetteville, Arkansas (USA)
- Skopje, Exhibition from the Fine Arts Colony in Prilep, KIC
- 1994 Skopje, Winter Salon, Art Gallery
- 1993 Skopje, Drawings, DLUM Annual Exhibition
- Skopje Exhibition of 14 professors from the Faculty of Fine Arts, ANIMA Gallery
- Tempi, Arizona (USA), Drawings, Weatherspoon Art Gallery
- Skopje, Small Plastic, Art Gallery
- Skopje, Drowings – Biennail, National Library Kliment Ohridski
- Skopje, Winter Salon, Art Gallery
- 1992 Skopje, Winter Salon, Art Gallery
- 1991 Skopje, Small Plastic, Art Gallery
- 1990 Skopje, 10th Anniversary since the foundation of the Faculty of Fine Arts, ANIMA Gallery
- 1989 Skopje, II Youth Biennail, Museum of Contemporary Art-Skopje
- Skopje, DLUM Annual Exhibition
- 1988 Skopje Graduated students from the FFA
- Skopje, DLUM Annual Exhibition
- 1984 Skopje, Happening, Youth Center

== Public performances – sculptures and monuments ==
- 2017 ASPHYXIA, hyperrealism, Skopje, Macedonia
- 2017 Ordinary Man, bronze, Tübingen, Germany
- 2016 Metodija Satorov Sarlo, bronze, Prilep
- 2014 Horseman monument of General Apostolski
- 2012 Kuzman Josifofski Pity, bronze, Prilep
- 2012 Gjorce Petrov, bronze, Prilep
- 2010 Horseman monument of Dame Gruev, bronze, Macedonia Square, Skopje
- 2010 Horseman monument of Goce Delcev, bronze, Macedonia Square, Skopje
- 2010 Monument of St. Cyril and Methodius. bronze, The Stone Bridge, Skopje
- 2008 Itar Pejo, bronze, Prilep
- 2007 Monuments of the "Defenders of Macedonia", marble, Skopje
- 2006 "Broken Wing", bronze and granite, Skopje
- 2005 " Alexander the Great ", bronze, Prilep
- 2004 "Phoenix", steel, Bul. Macedonia, Skopje
- 1999 "Sculpture-Temple" – the Dome, processed brick, stone, metal – the plateau on Str. Kliment Ohridski, Skopje
- 1998 Iconostasis in the church St. Leontie in Vodocha, Strumica
- A portrait of Dimitar Makedonski, marble, the school yard of the Elementary School Dimitar Makedonski, Skopje
- Part of the project "Sculpture-Temple", stone, the plateau in front of the Museum of Contemporary Art-Skopje

== Awards ==
- 2016 Sv. Kliment Ohridski
- 2015 Metodija Satorov Sarlo, first prize
- 2012 Kuzman Josifofski Pity, Public Competition of the City of Skopje, First Prize
- 2011 I Award Macedonian National Theater, Sculptures of Petre Prlicko, Meri Boskova and Todorce Nikolovski
- 2011 "13 November 2011" Award of Merit for the City of Prilep
- 2011 Part of Kuzman Josifovski Pitu, Public Competition of the City of Prilep, First Prize
- 2011 Gjorce Petrov Public Competition of the City of Prilep, First Prize
- 2010 I Award, Three Muses, colonnade Center of Skopje
- 2008 II Interpretative Award on the Competition for Monument of St. Cyril and Methodius, Skopje
- 2008 III Award on the International Competition for horseman, Philip II Skopje
- 2008 I Interpretative Award on the International Competition for Horseman sculptures of Goce Delcev and Dame Gruev, Macedonia Square, Skopje
- 2008 III Award, Water fountain with Sculpture of Philip II, Skopje
- 2007 III Award on the international Competition for horseman sculpture and water fountain of Alexander the Great, Skopje
- 2004 DLUM Annual Award "Nerezi Masters", Museum of the City of Skopje
- 1998 DLUM Annual Award "Nerezi Masters", Art Gallery, Skopje
- 1993 DLUM Annual Award "Small Plastic", Art Gallery, Skopje
