= Luc Piron =

Belgian artist

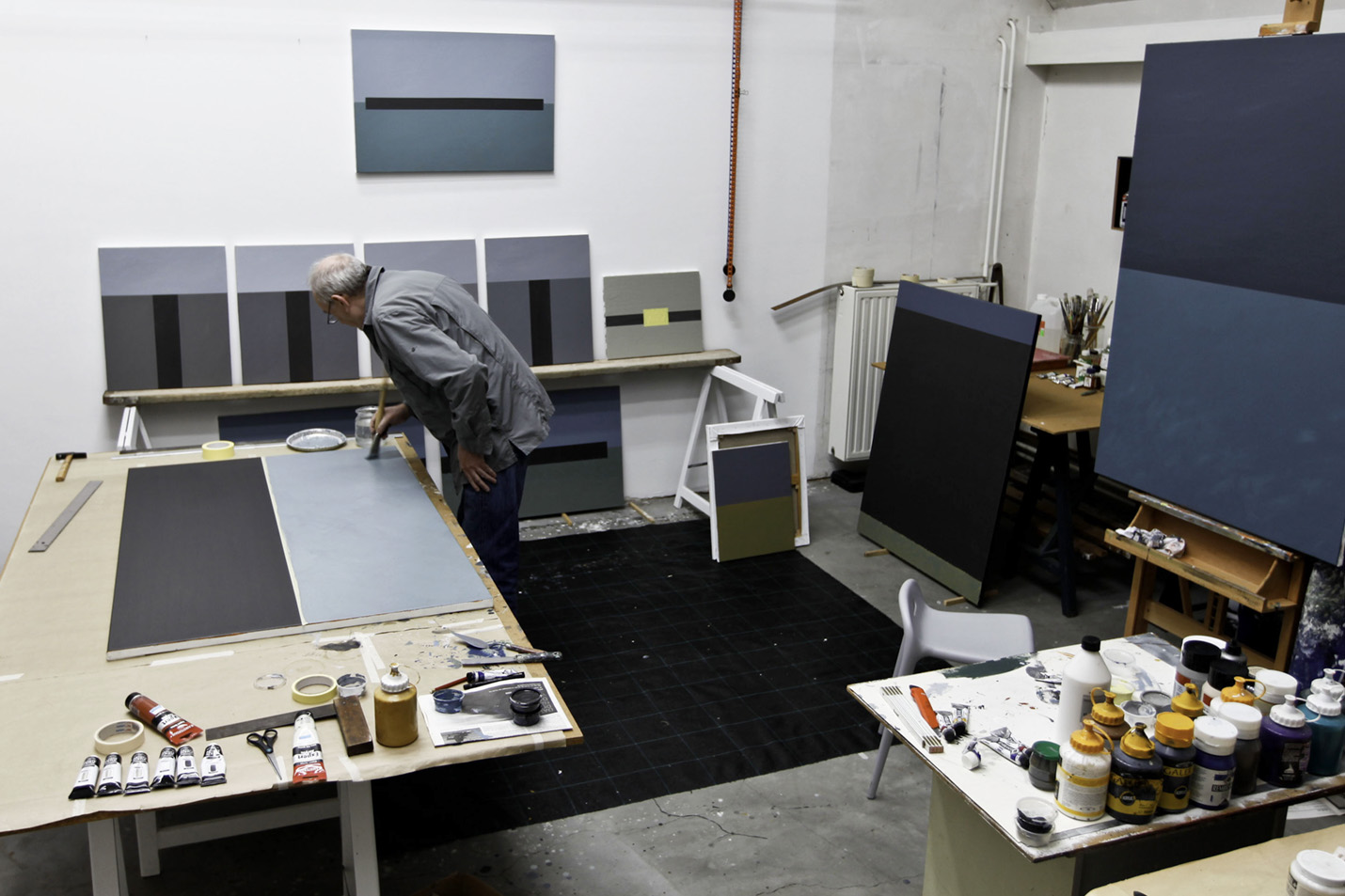
- Piron in his studio, 2013
- Born: Luc Piron; January 5, 1952; Willebroek, Belgium
- Education: Mechelen Royal Academy of Fine Arts; AntwerpRoyal Academy of Fine Arts
- Occupation: Painter

Luc Piron (born 5 January 1952 Willebroek, Belgium) is a Belgian artist. He is a painter and printmaker. He is also a photographer and experiments with the possibilities of computer art.

== Art school ==
Luc Piron studied art at the Mechelen Royal Academy of Fine Arts and at the Antwerp Royal Academy of Fine Arts (Nationaal Hoger Instituut voor Schone Kunsten van Antwerpen). While in art school, the young artist received the “Prijs Singer-Frieden voor monumentale schilderkunst” in 1970 and the “prijs Pro Civitate Kleur, lijn, volume” in 1971.

== Early recognition in the 1970s ==
Luc Piron had his first important group exhibition – with three other artists – in 1974 in the Provinciaal Centrum Arenberg, in Antwerp (= Antwerpen), Belgium. Again in 1974, the well-known poet Herman De Coninck chose him to illustrate a bibliophile book of poems entitled Puur Natuur (Pure Nature). In 1975, the young artist received the “state prize” for engraving – a price awarded to fine artists every three years. In the same year, Piron took part in the 3rd Triennale of the Lalit Kaba Akademi (National Academy of Arts) in New Delhi, India. The following year Piron had a solo exhibition in the renowned Lens Fine Art Gallery in Antwerp.

In 1977, Piron was invited to take part in an exhibition called Rubens Now at the ICC, the International Cultural Center, in Antwerp. “The Internationaal Cultureel Centrum (ICC) in Antwerp is the first official institution for contemporary art in Flanders. In the 1970s and the early 1980s it contributed decisively to the reception of Belgian and international avant-garde art,” according to a statement of the other major art museum in Antwerp, the Museum of Modern Art, Antwerp or M HKA. A year later he cooperated with the composer and sound artist Baudouin Oosterlynck in a performance and environment, the Bondage Room. The Bondage Room performance was an advanced intervention, by Luc Piron and Baudouin Oosterlynck, that reflected his thirst for radical experimentation, but it also reflected the spirit of the times.

== Middle and late period ==
In 1980 Piron had several exhibitions, including one exhibition in the Museum of Contemporary Art known as the Centraal Museum in Utrecht (The Netherlands). He was featured in several publications, including a radio broadcast. The next year, he exhibited in the gallery Pieter Celie. In addition to many exhibitions in Belgium and The Netherlands, Luc Piron exhibited in such countries as Spain, Germany, Italy, and India. Thus, he had an exhibition in Bilbao (Spain) in 1982. In the same year, his work was discussed in the book Kunstbeeld in Vlaanderen vandaag – “100 Vlaamse kunstenaars.” There were other notable exhibitions, such as the one discussed in 1986 by Willem Elias in the journal VUB Nieuw Tijdschrift.

In 1992, his exhibition “Initialen vaan een verloren landschap” took place in the renowned Lens Fine Art Gallery in Antwerp. In that year, Piron was also invited to take part in the Euregionale international exhibitions in Hasselt that featured artists from the Euregio (Belgium, The Netherlands; West Germany), and that was co-organized by the Ludwig Forum für Internationale Kunst (for short: Museum Ludwig) in Aachen, Germany.

In early 1993, Etienne Wynants reviewed the exhibition “Euregionale ‘92" in the art magazine De Witte Raaf. The exhibition in Hasselt, organized in cooperation with Wolfgang Becker, the director of Museum Ludwig in Aachen, featured works by Gabriele Heider, Günther Beckers, Malou Swinnen, Luc Piron, Roel Knappstein, Paul Devens, Daniel Dutrieux and André Delalleau in the Provinciaal Museum, Hasselt (Feb. 1993). Wynants overall impression was not so positive. But the art critic praised the work of Günther Beckers (“Waarlijk een kunstschilder uit de Euregio Maas-Rijn, zoals een reeks mystiekerige portretschilderijen, enkele concerttaferelen en een serie aquarellen illustreren”) and “a series of variations of the landscape theme, lyrical abstract drawings and paintings, done by Luc Piron”.

In Germany, his participation in the Figurenfeld project received attention repeatedly in 2005. Piron's computer graphiques shown in the context of the exhibition “Erfahren, Erinnern” (Catholic University of Eichstätt-Ingolstadt) reflect on insane, cruel war. They were stimulated by the 'Figurenfeld' land art ensemble of Alois Wünsche-Mitterecker. The press called “Erfahren, Erinnern” an “internationally notable exhibition.”

Again in Germany, Piron took part in the “Hortus – Wander Wunderkammer” exhibition in 2008. De Zuid-Duitse pers schreef over deze tentoonstelling in Eichstätt.

In 2009, Piron participated in the exhibition “Clinamen” in Brussels that was reviewed in the newspaper La Libre. And in 2010, he was invited to take part in the exhibition “Niet van Gisteren” in the Cultural Center Mechelen.

During the last decades, Piron has become increasingly interested in the relationships between surface, space, and material. Research related to themes such as "the void" and "chance" resulted in minimalist paintings, prints, computer art, and drawings. Critics noted a symbiosis of the purely abstract and figurative elements, of that which can be touched and the illusionary.

Since 2010, Luc Piron discovered photography as an artistic medium. His photographic oeuvre tends more towards graphics than to pure photography – he calls it “photographics.” He has taken photos of the landscape of his area, the Flemish Hageland. And he worked for three years on a series of photos focused on the landscape of the Demer river, capturing the four seasons. The result was summed up in artist book, "Demer – Het Land Langs de Rivier" (2014).

In his series “Shelters” Piron drew on the Flemish love for cabin [cubicle] and brick architecture.

Another large series of photos, entitled “The Invisible Time” (“De on-zichtbare tijd”) engages in a dialogue with Edward Muybridge's “The Human Figure in Motion” in a new pictorial style. The oeuvre of Luc Piron cannot be placed in a stylistic category or an -ism. He remains an experimenting artist in today's visual art. Presently Piron is based in Tielt-Winge. His wife, Greet Stroobants, is a ceramics artist.

== Teaching ==
In addition to being an independent artist, Luc Piron has also taught etching for a number of years at the Flemish Art Academy in Brussels.

== Solo and group exhibitions (selection) ==
- "Annie Debie, Magda Francot, Luc Piron, Paul Van Eyck". Provinciaal Centrum Arenberg, Antwerp, Belgium, 1974.
- 3rd Triennale-India. Lalit Kaba Akademi (= National Academy of Arts), New Delhi, India, 1975.
- "Luc Piron", Lens Fine Art Gallery, Antwerp, Belgium 1976.
- "RUBENS NU [Rubens Now]: Een begrip of een produkt ?", ICC, Antwerp, Belgium, 1977.
- "Luc Piron, [with] Baudouin Oosterlynck [music]" - Bondage Room. Kessel-Lo, Belgium, Sept. 22-Oct.22, 1978.
- "Luc Piron", Museum Dhondt-Dhaenens, Deurle, Belgium 1978.
- "Luc Piron", Museum voor Hedendaagse Kunst Utrecht, The Netherlands 1980.
- "Luc Piron", exhibition at the Rijkshogeschool voor de Kunsten (RhoK), Brussels-Etterbeek, Belgium 1981.
- "Erfahren, Erinnern" (the Figurenfeld exhibition), Hofgartenbibliothek, Catholic University of Eichstätt-Ingolstadt, Germany, 2005.
- "Institut Tibetain Yeunten Ling – tentoonstelling 80 kunstenaars". Huy, Belgium, March 25 – April 9, 2007.
- "Niet van gisteren: Een generatie kunstenaars in Mechelen 1945–1965". Cultuurcentrum Mechelen, Mechelen, Belgium, Oct. 24- Dec. 19, 2010.
- Jaarlijkse Kunsttentoonstelling, Davidsfonds Willebroek, kasteel Bel Air, Blaasveld, Belgium May 2012.

== Literature ==
- HUYGENS, Frank / VAN DE VOORD, Anne. Niet van gisteren. Een Generatie Kunstenaars in Mechelen 1945–1975. Mechelen : Stad Mechelen, 2010. [On Luc Piron and others.]
- LENAERTS, Kris / DEVOS, Claude. Luc Piron. Antwerpen : Lens Fine Art, 1976. (in French) (in Dutch)
- PIRON, Luc. Bondage Room. n.p. : Piron 1978.
