= Franz Gertsch =

Swiss painter (1930–2022)

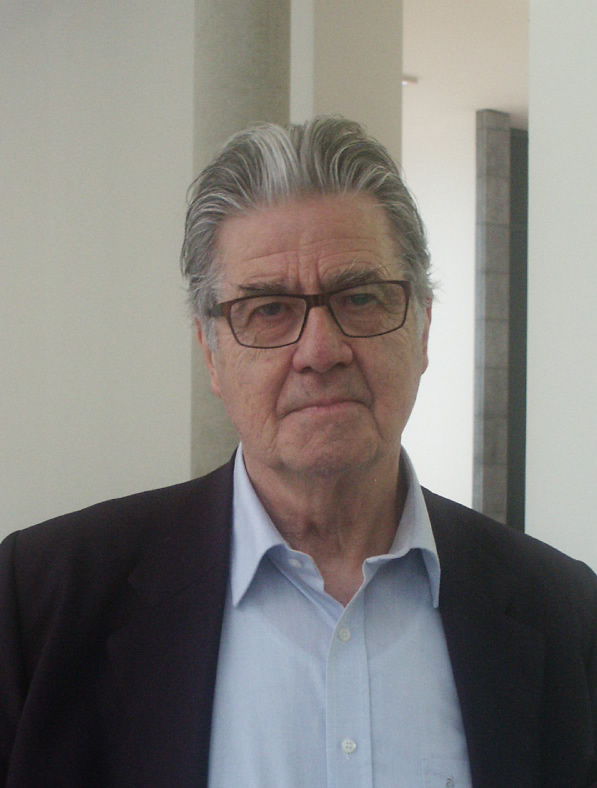
- Gertsch in 2014
- Born: 8 March 1930; Mörigen, Switzerland
- Died: 21 December 2022 (aged 92)
- Known for: Painting
- Movement: Photorealism

Franz Gertsch (8 March 1930 – 21 December 2022) was a Swiss painter and printmaker who was known for his large format photorealistic portraits and detailed studies of nature.

== Biography ==
Gertsch was born 1930 in Mörigen, Switzerland. Between 1947 and 1952 he studied with Max von Mühlenen and Hans Schwarzenbach in Bern. In 1972, he took part in the documenta 5 in Kassel with his painting "Medici". He participated in the 1978 and 2003 Venice Biennale and had a solo show there in 1999. Gertsch’s woodcuts were first shown at the Museum of Modern Art in New York in 1990, as part of the museum's "projects" series, curated by Riva Castleman. His work has since been presented at several retrospective exhibitions, the latest due to open in June 2024 at Louisiana Museum of Modern Art in Copenhagen. In 2002 Gertsch opened a Museum Franz Gertsch in Burgdorf. On the 8 March 2019, Frantz Gertschs birthday, the Museums expansion was inaugurated by the Federal Councilor Simonetta Sommaruga.

Gertsch died on 21 December 2022, at the age of 92 in Riggisberg in Canton Bern.

== Work ==
Gertsch is known for his realistic paintings and woodcuts for which he developed a new technique. The artist’s first large sized realist paintings date from 1969, when he painted “Huaa…!”, based on a film still showing a 19th century cavalryman the moment he’s been hit by a bullet. “Huaa...!” initiated the turn to the artist’s brightly coloured photorealistic works of the 1970s, which were often based on Gertsch’s own documentary-style snapshots of family and friends. With these works, Gertsch gained attention as an observer of Swiss counterculture. His self-titled “situation portraits” include the artist’s depictions of his gender fluid friends getting ready for a party, which was called “a new art form” by the American psychologist and LSD guru Timothy Leary.

Following his participation in the 1972 documenta, Gertsch’s new work featured more tightly framed figures. This phase of the artist’s work ended in 1978–1979 with five portraits of rock musician Patti Smith. In these paintings, Gertsch presents the rock icon in a realistic and authentic way, crouching in front of an amplifier, leaning forward into a tangle of microphones, or seen from behind or to the very edge of the painting.

Moving between painting and printmaking, and portraiture and landscape, he maintained an investment in the photorealist image and its simultaneous citation and monumentalization of the photographic instant. Gertsch’s figurative and photorealistic works can be associated with the European Pop art movement and with contemporary artists such as Gerhard Richter and Sigmar Polke in Germany, as well as Chuck Close in the USA. Just like these three artists, Gertsch’s point of departure is the photographic image. Focusing on detailed nature studies and close-up portraits, Gertsch however developed his unique style separating him from the social commentary and ironic motifs of Pop art. Gertsch noted the fundamental influence Pop art had on his artistic career: “It was only through my encounter with Pop art in the mid-1960s that I finally found a way to enter into current art trends”. Together with Markus Raetz, Benedict Fivian, and Herbert Distel, he was represented in the 2017 retrospective Swiss Pop Art at the Aargauer Kunsthaus.

From 1976 to 2013 he created a total of 28 paintings and 15 monochrome woodcuts; he worked on a single composition for up to a year. In 1986, Gertsch took a break from painting to master the woodcut printmaking technique, in which he has pioneered new territory. In his woodcuts, the artist is said to use colour expressive rather than realistically, in order to define anew the relationship between colour and three-dimensional space. The first motifs were monumental portraits of young women, the various prints were all in different colours and thus assumed the character of individual sheets. In addition to the detailed work in cutting the wooden plates, Gertsch’s graphic prints entail time-consuming mixing and colour testing of binder and mineral pigments especially imported from Japan, and thorough testing of hand-made Japan paper for the best possible transfer of colour from the print plates to the finished result. Colour played a central role for Gertsch – to the artist, the photographic image becomes a bearer of abstract qualities in colour and space. In his own words: «The more I focus on the photographic image, the more I move away from it» – towards recognizing that colour and the work has their own life, separate from the motif.

== Works ==
=== Early works (1969–1976) ===
- Huaa...! (1969)
- Maria mit Kindern (1971)
- Medici (1971/72)
- Gaby und Luciano (1973)
- At Luciano's House (1973)
- Barbara und Gaby (1974)
- Marina schminkt Luciano (1975)

=== Main works (1978–2004) ===
- Patti Smith I, II, V (1978/79)
- Selbstbildnis (1980)
- Johanna I (1983/84)
- Natascha IV (1987/88)
- Silvia I (1998)
- Gräser I (1995/96)
- Gräser IV (1998/99)

=== Late works ===
- Herbst (2007/08)
- Sommer (2008/2009)
- Winter (2009)
- Frühling (2011)

== Exhibitions ==
=== Solo exhibitions ===
- 2024
  - "Franz Gertsch", Louisiana Museum of Modern Art, Humblebæk
  - "Franz Gertsch. Selected Woodcuts", Galleri K, Oslo
- 2020
  - "Franz Gertsch. Die Siebziger", Museum Franz Gertsch, Burgdorf, LENTOS Kunstmuseum Linz, Linz
  - "Franz Gertsch. Looking Back. Hommage zum Neunzigsten", Graphische Sammlung ETH Zürich, Zürich
- 2019
  - "Franz Gertsch. Es malt sich wie von selbst", Museum Franz Gertsch, Burgdorf
  - "Franz Gertsch. Frühling, Sommer, Herbst und Winter", Museum Franz Gertsch, Burgdorf
  - "Franz Gertsch. Winter und Sommer", Galerie Kornfeld, Bern
  - "Franz Gertsch. Selected Woodcuts 1986-2017", Galleri K, Oslo
- 2018
  - "Franz Gertsch. Bilder sind meine Biografie", Kunsthalle zu Kiel, Kiel
  - "Franz Gertsch: Polyfocal Allover", Swiss Institute (SI), New York
  - "Franz Gertsch. Looking at you", Museum Franz Gertsch, Burgdorf
- 2017
  - "Franz Gertsch visages paysages", Musée Jenisch, Vevey
  - "Franz Gertsch", Galerie Skopia, Genf
  - "Franz Gertsch. Sommer", Museum Franz Gertsch, Burgdorf
  - "Franz Gertsch. Neu und unbekannt", Museum Franz Gertsch, Burgdorf
  - "Franz Gertsch. Selected monumental woodcuts", Galleri K, TEFAF Maastricht
- 2016
  - "Werke von Franz Gertsch", Museum Franz Gertsch, Burgdorf
  - "Franz Gertsch. Portraits and Landscapes: Woodcuts", Galleri K, Oslo
- 2015
  - "Franz Gertsch. Gewachsen", Museum Franz Gertsch, Burgdorf
  - "Franz Gertsch. Frühe Holzschnitte", Kabinett, Museum Franz Gertsch, Burgdorf
  - "Franz Gertsch. Johanna & Co. feat. Andy Warhol", Museum Franz Gertsch, Burgdorf
  - "Franz Gertsch", Galerie Michael Haas, Berlin
- 2014
  - "Franz Gertsch", Galerie Skopia, Genf
  - "Franz Gertsch", Les Abattoirs, Toulouse
  - "Franz Gertsch: Die Jahreszeiten", Museum Kurhaus Kleve, Kleve
  - "Franz Gertsch. Triptychon Guadeloupe", Museum Folkwang, Essen
- 2013
  - "Franz Gertsch Holzschnitte. Aus der Natur gerissen", Museum Sinclair-Haus, Bad Homburg
  - "Franz Gertsch. Geheimnis Natur", Museum Frieder Burda, Baden-Baden
- 2012
  - "Franz Gertsch. Momentaufnahme", Museum Franz Gertsch, Burgdorf
  - "Franz Gertsch. Die vier Jahreszeiten", Museum Franz Gertsch, Burgdorf
- 2011
  - "Franz Gertsch. Aus dem Frühwerk", museum franz gertsch, Burgdorf
  - "Franz Gertsch. Die vier Jahreszeiten", museum franz gertsch, Burgdorf
  - "Franz Gertsch. Das grosse Gras", Museum Franz Gertsch, Burgdorf
  - "Franz Gertsch. Jahreszeiten. Werke von 1983 bis 2011", Kunsthaus Zürich
  - "Franz Gertsch – Holzschnitte", Galerie Haas AG, Zürich
  - "Franz Gertsch – Holzschnitte- ausgewählte Separatdrucke", Galerie Kornfeld und Cie., Bern
- 2010
  - "Rot & Blau. Franz Gertsch und Max von Mühlenen", museum franz gertsch, Burgdorf
  - "Franz Gertsch. Drei Gemälde aus dem Vier Jahreszeiten Zyklus", museum franz gertsch, Burgdorf
- 2009
  - "Franz Gertsch. 1950 und 1960: Skizzen und Vorzeichnungen zu, Tristan Bärmann‘", museum franz gertsch, Burgdorf
  - "Franz Gertsch. Die neuen Jahreszeiten", museum franz gertsch, Burgdorf
  - "Eigenleben der Farbe. Farbproben zur Druckgraphik von Franz Gertsch", museum franz gertsch, Burgdorf
  - "Franz Gertsch – Gräser – Holzschnitte", Galerie Lindner, Wien
  - "Silvia", Galerie Haas & Fuchs, Berlin
- 2008
  - "Franz Gertsch", Galerie Skopia, Genf
  - "Franz Gertsch", Patrick Painter Inc., Santa Monica, CA
  - "Franz Gertsch. Herbst", museum franz gertsch, Burgdorf
  - "Franz Gertsch. Arbeiten auf Papier", museum franz gertsch, Burgdorf
  - "Franz Gertsch", Galerie Lovers of Fine Art, Gstaad
- 2007 "REHAU Aussicht Franz Gertsch", REHAU ART, Rehau
- 2006
  - "Franz Gertsch – Monumentale Holzschnitte", museum franz gertsch, Burgdorf
  - "Franz Gertsch. Retrospektive – das malerische Werk 1951–1986", MUMOK Museum für Moderne Kunst Stiftung
  - Ludwig, Wien, zusammen mit
    - "Franz Gertsch. Naturporträts", Albertina, Wien
    - "Franz Gertsch, Ikon Gallery", Birmingham
- 2005
  - "Franz Gertsch. Die Retrospektive", museum franz gertsch, Burgdorf, Kunstmuseum Bern, Ludwig Forum für Internationale Kunst, Aachen (2006), Kunsthalle Tübingen (2006)
  - "M+M – Der Johanna Zyklus", museum franz gertsch, Burgdorf
  - "Franz Gertsch – Werke aus der Sammlung Stiftung Willy Michel", museum franz gertsch, Burgdorf
  - "Chuck Close. Franz Gertsch", Galerie Haas & Fuchs, Berlin, galerie im park, Burgdorf
  - "Franz Gertsch, Aquarelle – Schottland 1961–1965" – Museum Kurhaus Kleve
  - "Franz Gertsch. Fang Lijun. The Languages of Nature”, White Space, Peking
- 2004
  - "Franz Gertsch – Werke aus der Sammlung Stiftung Willy Michel", museum franz gertsch, Burgdorf
  - "Franz Gertsch. Aquarelle – Schottland 1961–1965", Graphische Sammlung der ETH Zürich, Museum Kurhaus Kleve
  - "Presence", The Speed Art Museum, Louisville, Kentucky
  - "Franz Gertsch – Patti Smith”, Gagosian Gallery, New York
  - "Martin Disler. Franz Gertsch", Galerie & Edition René Steiner, Erlach
- 2003
  - "Franz Gertsch. Silvia, kestnergesellschaft, Hannover
  - "Franz Gertsch – Patti Smith", museum franz gertsch, Burgdorf, Pinakothek der Moderne, München
- 2002
  - "Franz Gertsch", Galerie Monica de Cardenas, Mailand
  - "Franz Gertsch. Das Gesamtwerk 1987–2002", Eröffnungsausstellung museum franz gertsch, Burgdorf
  - "Franz Gertsch. Monumentale Holzschnitte", Bündner Kunstmuseum, Chur
- 2001 "Franz Gertsch. Xylographies monumentales 1986–2000", Centre culturel suisse, Paris
- 2000
  - "Franz Gertsch. Holzschnitte, Gräser", Galerie Haas & Fuchs, Berlin
  - "Franz Gertsch”, Hess Collection at Vinopolis, London
- 1999
  - "Franz Gertsch – Gemälde und Holzschnitte 1987 bis 1997", Museum Kurhaus Kleve
  - "Stille Wasser. 7 Räume, 7 Künstler um Franz Gertsch", Kunstmuseum Thun
- 1997
  - "Franz Gertsch. Preisträger des Kaiserrings Goslar", Mönchehaus Museum für moderne Kunst, Goslar
  - "Franz Gertsch – Landschaften und Porträts 1986–1995", Hamburger Bahnhof – Museum für Gegenwart, Staatliche Museen zu Berlin
  - "Franz Gertsch”, Cabinet des estampes, Musée d'art et d'histoire, Genf
  - "Franz Gertsch. Holzschnitte”, Kunsthalle Burgdorf
- 1996 "Franz Gertsch", Frankfurt, MMK Museum für Moderne Kunst
- 1995 "Franz Gertsch”, Aichi Prefectural Museum of Art, Nagoya
- 1994
  - "Franz Gertsch. Holzschnitte 1986–1994", Staatliche Kunsthalle Baden-Baden
  - "Franz Gertsch. Travaux récents", Galerie Patrick Roy, Lausanne
  - "Franz Gertsch. Holzschnitte und Malerei auf Papier", Kunstmuseum Bern
  - "Franz Gertsch. Holzschnitte 1986–1994", Galerie Kornfeld & Cie., Bern
- 1993 "Franz Gertsch. Landschaften", Graphische Sammlung der ETH, Zürich, Städtische Galerie im Städelschen Kunstinstitut, Frankfurt a. M.
- 1992 "Franz Gertsch. Gravures sur bois 1986–1991", Galerie Patrick Roy, Lausanne
- 1991
  - "Franz Gertsch, Eröffnungsausstellung", Galerie Rigassi, Bern
  - "Franz Gertsch. Holzschnitte", Städtische Galerie im Lenbachhaus, München
  - "Franz Gertsch. Nine Large Scale Woodcuts”, Hirshhorn Museum and Sculpture Garden, Washington, D.C., San José Museum of Art
- 1990 "Franz Gertsch. Large Scale Woodcuts”, Serie "Projects", Museum of Modern Art, New York
- 1989 "Franz Gertsch. Bois gravés monumentaux. Grossformatige Holzschnitte. Large-scale woodcuts”, Cabinet des estampes und Musée Rath, Musée d’art et d’histoire, Genf
- 1986
  - "Franz Gertsch", Museum Moderner Kunst, Wien, Kunsthalle Basel
  - "Franz Gertsch. Johanna II", Kunsthalle Bern
- 1983 "Franz Gertsch, Arbeiten 1981/82/83", Knoedler, Zürich
- 1981/82 "Franz Gertsch. Major Works”, Louis K. Meisel Gallery, New York
- 1980 "Franz Gertsch", Kunsthaus Zürich, Sprengelmuseum Hannover
- 1979 "Franz Gertsch", Galerie Veith Turske, Köln
- 1976 "Franz Gertsch", Galerie Veith Turske, Köln
- 1975 "Franz Gertsch", Akademie der Künste, Berlin, Kunstverein Braunschweig, Kunsthalle Düsseldorf, Kunsthalle Basel
- 1973 "Franz Gertsch", Nancy Hoffmann Gallery, New York
- 1972
  - "Franz Gertsch", Galerie Mikro, Berlin
  - "Franz Gertsch", Kunstmuseum Luzern
- 1971 "Franz Gertsch", Galerie Verna, Zürich
- 1970
  - Galerie Stampa, Basel
  - "Franz Gertsch – Neue Bilder II", Galerie Toni Gerber, Bern
  - "Franz Gertsch – Neue Bilder I", Galerie Toni Gerber, Bern
- 1969 "Franz Gertsch – Bilder und Collagen", Galerie Riehentor, Basel
- 1968 "Franz Gertsch. Bilder und Collagen 1968", Galerie Krebs, Bern
- 1966 "Franz Gertsch", Orell Füssli, Zürich
- 1965 "Franz Gertsch. Aquarelle", Galerie Bertram, Burgdorf
- 1964 "Franz Gertsch", Anlikerkeller, Bern
- 1962 "Franz Gertsch", Anlikerkeller, Bern
- 1955 "Franz Gertsch. Malerei, Graphik", Anlikerkeller, Bern
- 1951 "Franz Gertsch", Galerie Simmen, Bern

== Scholarships and awards ==
- 1949 De Harris scholarship
- 1967 Louise Aeschlimann scholarship
- 1974–75 DAAD scholarship, Berlin
- 1997 Goslarer Kaiserring
- 1998 Kulturpreis der Bürgi-Willert-Foundation
- 2005 Honorary citizen Christian-Albrechts-Universität, Kiel
- 2006 Honorary citizen Rüschegg

== See also ==
- Museum Franz Gertsch
