= Eivind Furnesvik =

Eivind Furnesvik is a Norwegian art dealer and art historian, the owner of STANDARD (OSLO), the gallery he established in 2005 in Oslo, with Peter Snare (who left in 2007).

Before opening his own gallery, Furnesvik worked for two non-profit institutions in Oslo, the National Foundation for Art in Public Buildings, where he was responsible for commissioning artworks, and the Photographers Gallery, where he was a director.

In 2014, The Guardian named him in their "Movers and makers: the most powerful people in the art world". In July 2016, Furnesvik was listed by Artnet as one of 10 most respected art dealers in Europe.

In 2021, it attracted attention that the artist Ina Bache-Wiig was removed from an exhibition she was to have at the Furnesvik’s gallery because Eivind Furnesvik reacted negatively to the fact that she had clicked "like" on a Facebook post.

"Furnesvik replied that it was inappropriate for Standard to be a mouthpiece for the values Bache-Wiig stood for. - He said that the gallery should be a safe place for everyone and that with my works it was not », says Ina Bache-Wiig to the Norwegian magazine Subject.
