= Joe Goode =

American painter (1937–2025)

- Born: Jose Bueno; March 23, 1937; Oklahoma City, Oklahoma, U.S.
- Died: March 22, 2025 (aged 87); Los Angeles, California, U.S.
- Education: Chouinard Art Institute
- Known for: Painting
- Movement: Pop Art
- Spouse(s): Judy Winans (m. 1960–1962; divorced), Natalie Bieser (m. 1978–?; )
- Website: www.joegoodestudio.com

Joe Goode (né Jose Bueno; March 23, 1937 – March 22, 2025) was an American visual artist, known for his pop art paintings. Goode made a name for himself in Los Angeles, California, through his cloud imagery and milk bottle paintings which were associated with the Pop Art movement. The artist was also closely associated with Light and Space, a West Coast art movement of the early 1960s. He resided in Los Angeles, California.

== Background ==
Joe Goode was born on March 23, 1937, in Oklahoma City, Oklahoma, immediately following the Dust Bowl period and at the tail end of The Great Depression. His family was Roman Catholic, and his parents divorced when Joe was 11 years old. He has a younger brother named Dick who was born twelve months after him. His father had a great influence on his artistry. He too was an artist who made signage for a department store in town and painted portraits. The two would sketch various actors on screen when the family got a television and Goode would attempt to emulate his father’s ability to capture likenesses.

During the summer Goode’s mother would ship him and his brother off to visit their grandparents on a ranch in Arlington, Texas. Goode explained that the perceived leisure quickly turned into child labor as the Goode boys were put to work picking potatoes on Sproull’s Ranch.

Goode had little ambition and little cultural exposure as a child, but upon leaving high school he moved to Los Angeles where his old friend Ed Ruscha was going to art school. Shortly after his move he enrolled in the Chouinard Art Institute, marking the start of his artistic career. While attending Chouinard from 1959 to 1961, he studied under artists Emerson Woelffer, Robert Irwin, and Bill Moore. He married fellow student Judy Winans in 1960, together they had a daughter and divorced two years later. On March 22, 2025, Goode died one day before his 88th birthday.

== Early career ==
In December 1959, Goode traveled to Los Angeles, California, and began to make his name in the Los Angeles art scene. He embraced American pop art. He became part of a group of young artists living and working in California; this group included notable artists, such as Ken Price, Ed Kienholz, and Ronald Davis. His first solo exhibitions was in 1962 at the Dilexi Gallery in Los Angeles.

The American pop scene had a fascination with modern consumer culture and utilized the subject matter in many of their works. Goode and his contemporaries were also interested in graphic images, like those being created at Gemini Ltd. (now Gemini G.E.L.), an artists‘ printmaking workshop dedicated to collaborating with artists to produce artistic prints, lithographs, and other graphic art. During his early career, Goode worked alongside Gemini Ltd. to produce his own prints. Cloud and Self Portrait, both created in 1965, were the first two pieces he made at Gemini. In 1967, he completed the English still life series, a series of shifting glasses and spoons.

Untitled (Ocean Blue #12) by Joe Goode, 1988, Honolulu Museum of Art

== Exhibitions ==
=== "The New Paintings of Common Objects" ===
In 1962, Goode was exhibited alongside artists such as Andy Warhol, Roy Lichtenstein, and Edward Ruscha at The Pasadena Art Museum (now the Norton Simon Museum) in Pasadena, California. The exhibition, "The New Paintings of Common Objects," was an early display of the art movement eventually referred to as Pop Art. “Common Objects” was curated by Walter Hopps and is considered the first museum show in the United States to have exhibited Pop Art. This show featured Goode's paintings, Milk Bottle Painting (Green) and Milk Bottle Painting (Two-Part Blue). Composed of thickly painted canvases and milk bottles, Goode's two works draw inspiration from Surrealism and Assemblage. They exemplify a specific feeling of small-town America, with the placement of the milk bottle on the floor and the canvas hung low, reminding one of milk left on a doorstep. The paintings also invite a sense of loneliness, providing extra commentary on life in a small town.

=== "How The West Has Done! A Wild Wild West Show" ===
1966 saw Goode’s inclusion in an exhibition entitled How The West Has Done! A Wild Wild West Show, in Philadelphia, Pennsylvania, hosted by the Arts Council and curated by Audrey Sabol. The exhibition explored the art being created on the West Coast and brought to light the self-contained nature of the California Art Scene.

=== Other exhibitions and shows ===
Goode had been exhibiting his work in group and solo exhibitions since 1960. His very first group show, two years prior to "The New Paintings of Common Objects," took place in Oklahoma City at the Oklahoma Art Center. His first solo exhibition took place in 1962 in Los Angeles, CA, at the Dilexi Gallery.

From 2015 to 2021, Goode exhibited in four solo shows, two of which were held at the Peter Blake Gallery (2016 and 2018). His other two solo exhibits were held at the Kohn Gallery in 2021 and the KOKI ARTS gallery in Tokyo Japan (2015). Meanwhile, he participated in group shows throughout California from 2012 until the present. In 2022, Goode's work was a part of the exhibition, "Dissolve," at the Jack and Shanaz Langson Institute and Museum of California Art at the University of California, Irvine.

== Style ==
Goode’s style vacillates between both traditional and non-traditional forms of media which allowed him to toe the line between representational art and abstraction. His use of media also lends to a deeper exploration of differing ways of seeing the world. Examples of this were his milk bottles that act as a lens atop a field of color. This object also exemplified his affinity for simplistic, unassuming subject matter. His tendency of rending or tearing away a superficial canvas to expose another painting below also furthered this desire to show a different way of seeing the world.

His early works draw inspiration from artists such as Robert Irwin, who taught Goode at the Chouinard Art Institute. The minimalism of the milk bottle paintings was reminiscent of Irwin's canvases and the art of his Los Angeles contemporaries, who were experimenting with both pop art and minimalist abstraction. Additionally, a 1962 screwdriver lithograph of Goode's has direct parallels to the work of Jasper Johns, another one of Goode's influences.

== Works ==
=== Milk Bottles series ===
Beginning in 1961 and considered to be his first significant body of work, the Milk Bottles series consisted of fourteen, low-hanging abstract canvases of color with the faint outline of a milk bottle on the canvas. Outside of the canvas bounds, Goode would place a tangible milk bottle that overlapped the one on the canvas and was also covered in paint. The artist described coming home one morning after working a night shift and seeing milk bottles on his doorstep waiting for the milkman to collect. This moment inspired the series. He explained that, he sought to "activate" the space beyond the canvas and rather than creating some kind of three dimensional object to represent the milk bottle it made the most sense to simply use the actual object. Prior to these large scale paintings he was creating small drawings, so the milk bottle series marks a dramatic shift in his art making. Goode spoke about a specific painting in this series called Leroy which measured roughly ten feet with three milk bottles represented. Due to its sheer size it had to be destroyed because the artist could not fit the painting into his studio.

The series in its entirety is a hybrid of Minimalism and Pop Art. Though Goode did not specifically associate himself with the Pop Art movement, he didn't mind being labeled so. By toeing the line of painting or sculpture, two-dimensional or three, this series embodied Conceptualism as well. It paved the way for two solo exhibitions and the 1962 "New Painting of Common Objects" exhibit which is said to have launched his career. Furthermore, in November 1962, the piece titled, Untitled Milk Bottle (Purple) graced the cover of Artforum.

=== Staircases series ===
Goode created his Staircases series starting in 1964 and was inspired by the ready-mades of Marcel Duchamp and the staircases in the musicals of Busby Berkley. These works are physical staircases that lead to nothing, usually propped against a wall. Made up of wood and cheap carpeting, these staircases, like the Milk Bottles series, evoke a feeling of suburban, small-town America. The placement of the works makes the wall an integral part of the work, providing a dead, empty space for the staircase to lead into, and creating an advance and retreat quality for the viewer.

Goode's Staircases vary in size, with one of the largest being around nine-feet high. This massive staircase, along with two others, was created in Germany with the help of an art dealer named Hans Neuendorf. Neuendorf's brother was a carpenter and assisted Goode in the construction of the work. Neuendorf himself was a big supporter of Goode and put up several shows in Germany exhibiting his work. Unfortunately, due to the size and weight of the nine-foot staircase, which made it hard to handle, it never was displayed again. In storage, it was mishandled and eventually destroyed.

However, some works from the Staircases series have survived and can now be found in the permanent collections of museums such as the Museum of Contemporary Art (MOCA) in Los Angeles and the Museum of Modern Art (MoMA) in New York.

=== Clouds series ===
Clouds is thought to be the height of Goode's artistic career and the paintings in this series harken back to Romanticism. Within Clouds, there are three distinct variations. From 1967 to 1969 Goode produced his Photo Clouds series, while Torn Clouds was produced from years 1970 to 1976, and Vandalized Clouds was simultaneously painted from 1971 to 1975. Each cluster dealt with the subject matter differently. Photo Clouds demonstrates a surreal quality, Torn Clouds begins to tear away at the canvas to reveal what's below, and Vandalized Clouds is sharply biting as the soft ethereal clouds are interrupted by deep slashes in the canvas down to the cardboard underneath.

Once again evoking childhood and suburban life, Goode's Clouds are reminiscent of the clouds seen when laying in a field, further eliciting an emotional reaction from the viewer. Additionally, the series as a whole plays with the idea that the sky is constantly changing, never staying in one place for long. Goode's intention with the Clouds series was to comment on the idea of transparency, something he touches on with the Milk Bottles series but is fully realized here.

Goode saw his Clouds series featured prominently by Hans Neuendorf in his galleries in Hamburg and Cologne, Germany. In 1971, Neuendorf displayed Goode's Photo Cloud paintings at his two galleries, and in 1972, the Torn Sky paintings were exhibited in Cologne.

== Collections ==
- American Federation of Arts, New York, New York
- Art Institute of Chicago, Chicago, Illinois
- Boise Art Museum, Boise, Idaho
- Buffalo AKG Art Museum, Buffalo, New York
- Cantor Art Center, Stanford University, Palo Alto, California
- Cedars-Sinai Medical Center, Los Angeles, California
- De Young (Anderson Gallery of Graphic Arts), San Francisco, California
- Donald Bren Foundation, Los Angeles, California
- Flint Institute of Arts, Flint, Michigan
- Fondation Carmignac, Paris, France
- Frederick R. Weisman Art Foundation, Los Angeles, California
- Grey Art Gallery of NYU, New York, New York
- Henry Art Gallery Collection, Seattle, Washington
- Honolulu Museum of Art, Honolulu, Hawaii
- Laguna Art Museum, Laguna Beach, California
- Los Angeles County Museum of Art, Los Angeles, California
- The Menil Collection, Houston, Texas
- Metropolitan Museum of Art, New York City, New York
- Mildred Lane Kemper Art Museum, Washington University in St. Louis, Missouri
- Minneapolis Institute of Art, Minneapolis, Minnesota
- Moderna Museet, Stockholm, Sweden
- Museum of Contemporary Art Chicago, Chicago, Illinois
- Museum of Contemporary Art, Los Angeles, California
- Museum of Contemporary Art, San Diego, California
- Museum of Fine Arts, Houston, Texas
- Museum of Modern Art, Jerusalem, Israel
- Museum of Modern Art, New York, New York
- Museums Sheffield, Sheffield, England
- National Gallery of Art, Washington, D.C.
- National Gallery of Australia, Parkes, Australia
- National Gallery of Canada, Ottawa, Canada
- National Gallery of Victoria, Melbourne, Australia
- New Mexico Museum of Art, Santa Fe, New Mexico
- Norton Simon Museum, Pasadena, California
- The Oakland Museum, Oakland, California
- Oklahoma City Museum of Art, Oklahoma City, Oklahoma
- Oklahoma State Art Collection, Oklahoma City, Oklahoma
- Orange County Museum of Art, Newport Beach, California
- Orlando Museum of Art, Orlando, Florida
- Pomona College Art Museum, Claremont, California
- Portland Art Museum, Portland, Oregon
- Rhode Island School of Design Museum, Providence, Rhode Island
- Saint Louis Art Museum, St. Louis, Missouri
- San Diego Museum of Art, San Diego, California
- San Francisco Museum of Modern Art, San Francisco, California
- Santa Barbara Museum of Art, Santa Barbara, California
- Smithsonian American Art Museum, Washington, D.C.
- Smithsonian Institution / Hirshhorn Museum, Washington, D.C.
- Taubman Museum, Roanoke, Virginia
- UBS Art Collections, Zurich, Switzerland
- University of Kentucky Art Museum, Lexington, Kentucky
- University of Oklahoma, Norman, Oklahoma
- Victoria and Albert Museum, London, England
- Walker Art Center, Minneapolis, Minnesota
- Whitney Museum of American Art, New York City, New York
- Yale University Art Gallery, New Haven, Connecticut

== Solo exhibitions ==
- 1962: Dilexi Gallery, Los Angeles, California
- 1964: Exhibition of Paintings by Joe Goode, Rolf Nelson Gallery, Los Angeles, California
- 1966: Nicholas Wilder Gallery, Los Angeles, California
- 1967: English Still Life on White Tablecloth, Rowan Gallery, London, England
- 1968: Kornblee Gallery, New York City, New York
- 1969: Nicholas Wilder Gallery, Los Angeles, California
- 1970: Galerie Neuendorf, Cologne, Germany; Nicholas Wilder Gallery, Los Angeles, California
- 1971: Galerie Neuendorf, Hamburg, Germany; Nicholas Wilder Gallery, Los Angeles, CA; La Jolla Museum of Contemporary Art, La Jolla, CA; Mueller Gallery, Dusseldorf, Germany; Wall Reliefs, Pomona College Art Gallery, Claremont, California; Galleria Milano, Milan, Italy
- 1972: Joe Goode, Texas Gallery, Houston, TX; Joe Goode, Felicity Samuel Gallery, London, England; Galerie Neuendorf, Cologne, Germany; Lithographs 1962-1972, Margo Leavin Gallery, Los Angeles, California; Minneapolis Institute of the Arts, Minneapolis, MN; Nicholas Wilder Gallery, Los Angeles, CA; Recent Paintings, Corcoran and Corcoran, Coral Gables, FL; Contract Graphics, Houston, TX
- 1973: New Drawings, Texas Gallery, Houston, TX; Cirrus Gallery, Los Angeles, CA; Felicity Samuel Gallery, London, England; Joe Goode: Work Until Now, Fort Worth Art Center Museum, Fort Worth, TX (Travelled to Contemporary Arts Museum, Houston, TX); Galerie Neuendorf, Hamburg, Germany; Margo Leavin Gallery, Los Angeles, CA
- 1974: California State University, Northridge, CA; Vandalism Series, Nicholas Wilder Gallery, Los Angeles, CA; Vandalism (Lithographs), Cirrus Gallery, Los Angeles, CA
- 1975: Galerie Neuendorf, Hamburg, Germany; Felicity Samuel Gallery, London, England; Nicholas Wilder Gallery, Los Angeles, California
- 1976: Ex–Ray Drawings, James Corcoran Gallery, Los Angeles, California; Nicholas Wilder Gallery, Los Angeles, California; Joe Goode: Recent Work, Washington University Gallery of Art, St. Louis, Missouri
- 1977: A Selection of Paintings and Drawings, Mt. Saint Mary’s College Art Gallery, Los Angeles, California
- 1978: Nicholas Wilder Gallery, Los Angeles, CA; Graphic Works Retrospective, Cirrus Gallery, Los Angeles, CA
- 1979: Nicholas Wilder Gallery, Los Angeles, CA; Paintings, Drawings, Prints, Texas Gallery, Houston, TX
- 1980: Joe Goode, Charles Cowles Gallery, New York, NY
- 1981: Drawings 81, Margo Leavin Gallery, Los Angeles, CA; Recent Lithographs, Cirrus Gallery, Los Angeles, CA
- 1982: Paintings: Environmental Impact Series, ARCO Center for Visual Art, Los Angeles, CA; Joe Goode: Paintings, Prints, Works on Paper, Gallery One, Fort Worth, TX
- 1983: Retrospective of Graphic Works, Cirrus Gallery, Los Angeles, CA
- 1984: Joe Goode: Forest Fire Impressions, Asher/Faure Gallery, Los Angeles, CA; Charles Cowles Gallery, New York, NY; Lithographs, Cunningham Memorial Art Gallery, Bakersfield, CA
- 1985: Joe Goode: Paintings and Drawings, Braunstein Gallery, San Francisco, CA
- 1986: James Corcoran Gallery, Santa Monica, CA; Joe Goode, Thomas Babeor Gallery, La Jolla, San Diego, California
- 1987: Joe Goode: Milk Bottle Paintings 1961-1962, Pence Gallery, Santa Monica, CA
- 1989: The Ocean Blues, Compass Rose Gallery, Chicago, IL; New Paintings: The Ocean Blue Series, James Corcoran Gallery, Santa Monica, CA
- 1990: Joe Goode: Waterfall Paintings, James Corcoran Gallery, Santa Monica, CA
- 1991: Joe Goode: From Blue and Black Series, Takada Gallery, San Francisco, CA
- 1992: Joe Goode: New Paintings and Drawings, James Corcoran Gallery, Santa Monica, CA; Joe Goode, Karsten Greve Gallery, Paris, France; Laboratory: Joe Goode Tornado Triptych, The Los Angeles County Museum of Art, Los Angeles, CA; Joe Goode, Jack Tilton Gallery, New York, NY
- 1993: Tornado Paintings and Works on Paper, Takada Gallery, San Francisco, CA; Tornadoes, Soma Gallery, San Diego, CA
- 1994: Joe Goode: Pollution Paintings, LA Louver, Venice, CA; Shasta College, Redding, CA
- 1995: Painting & Paper Work, Nantenshi Gallery, Tokyo, Japan
- 1996: Global Warming: Pollution Paintings, LA Louver, Venice, CA
- 1997: Joe Goode, Orange County Museum of Art, Newport Beach, CA; Joe Goode: Retrospective of Paper Works, Cirrus Gallery, Los Angeles, CA
- 1998: Joe Goode: New Paintings, Takada Gallery, San Francisco, CA; Suns of Bitches, Moons of Dogs, LA Louver, Venice, CA; Works on Paper 1960-1973, Manny Silverman Gallery, Los Angeles, CA
- 1999: Paintings, Peter Blake Gallery, Laguna Beach, CA; Joe Goode: Cause and Effect Paintings, Frederick Spratt Gallery, San Jose, CA
- 2000: Recent Paintings, Franklin Parrasch Gallery, New York, NY; Joe Goode, LA Louver, Venice, CA
- 2001: The Cloud Paintings, Manny Silverman Gallery, Los Angeles, CA; Peter Blake Gallery, Laguna Beach, CA
- 2002: Cloud; Paintings from 1965 to Present, Stephen Wirtz Gallery, San Francisco, CA; Joe Goode, Texas Gallery, Houston, TX; LA Louver, Venice, CA; Peter Blake Gallery, Laguna Beach, CA; Plain Air, Bobbie Greenfield Gallery, Santa Monica, CA
- 2003: New Paintings, Shoshana Wayne, Santa Monica, CA
- 2004: Surface Paintings, Texas Gallery, Houston, TX
- 2005: X-RAY DRAWINGS, Manny Silverman Gallery, Los Angeles, CA; BURN OUT!, Craig Krull Gallery, Santa Monica, CA; Joe Goode, Cirrus Gallery, Los Angeles, CA
- 2007: New Work, Texas Gallery, Houston, TX
- 2008: JOEDONTNO, Bernard Jacobson Gallery, London, England; Ashes, DNJ Gallery, Los Angeles, CA; Paint IS Nature, Seiler & Mosseri-Marlio Gallerie, Zurich, Switzerland
- 2009: Joe Goode: Clouds, Paintings and Drawings from the 60’s and 70’s, Franklin Parrasch Gallery, New York, NY
- 2010: Joe Goode, Texas Gallery, Houston, TX; Golden Dreams, Greenfield Sacks Gallery, Santa Monica, CA
- 2011: Nighttime, Kohn Gallery, Los Angeles, CA
- 2012: Joe Goode, Texas Gallery, Houston, TX
- 2014: Joe Goode, Texas Gallery, Houston, TX; Flat Screen Nature, Kohn Gallery, Los Angeles, CA
- 2015: There’s Always Tomorrow, Van Doren Waxter, New York, NY; Joe Goode, Contemporary Art Museum, St. Louis, MO; Tip of the Iceberg, Leslie Sacks Fine Art, Santa Monica, CA; Moonglows & Fireflies, Koki Arts, Tokyo, Japan
- 2016: Joe Goode, Peter Blake Gallery, Laguna Beach, CA; Curtain Calls, Texas Gallery, Houston, TX
- 2017: Joe Goode, Leslie Sacks Gallery, Santa Monica, CA; Old Ideas with New Solutions, Kohn Gallery, Los Angeles, CA
- 2018: Joe Goode, Peter Blake Gallery, Laguna Beach, CA
- 2019: Environmental Impacts, Leslie Sacks Gallery, Santa Monica, CA

== Awards and grants ==
- American Foundation of Artists
- American Federation of Arts Award, 1966
- Cassandra Foundation
- Copley Foundation, 1967
- Ford Foundation Prize, 1963
- Maestro Grant, California Arts Council
- National Endowment for the Arts

== Sources ==
- Pop Art, Lucy R. Lippard, Praeger
- Pop Art Redefined, Barbara Rose, Praeger
- American Pop Art, Lawrence Alloway, Macmillan
- An Illustrated Dictionary of Pop, Jose Pierre, Barrons
- The Painter and The Photograph, Van Deren Coke, University of New Mexico Press
- The New Paintings, Udo Kulterman, Praeger
- California Art Review, Les Krantz, American References
- Who's Who in American Art, R.R. Bowker
- L.A. Pop in the Sixties, Ann Ayres, Newport Harbor Museum
- "Ashes" exhibition statement, DNJ Gallery
