= Monika Baumgartl =

German woman photographer

Monika Baumgartl (born 1942) is a German photographer, performance artist and representative of concrete photography.

== Life and work ==
Born in Prague, Protectorate of Bohemia and Moravia) Baumgartl trained as a photographer in Hofheim am Taunus from 1966 to 1968. She then moved to Düsseldorf, worked as an actress (among others a member of Die Bühne) and was assistant to the German filmmaker and video galerist Gerry Schum. Since 1970, she has been active as a photographic artist. From 1970 to 1976, she organised performances and joint exhibitions together with Klaus Rinke.

Baumgartl had her first solo exhibition in 1974. Her photographs are almost exclusively night shots. She participated in Documenta 5 in Kassel in 1972 in the section Individuelle Mythologien: Self-Representation - Performances - Activities - Changes and was also represented as an artist at Documenta 6 in 1977. Since the 1980s, she has worked as a trainer for tapdance and taiko.
