= Nuno Centeno =

- Born: 1978 or 1979 (age 46–47)
- Occupations: Art dealer and gallerist
- Known for: Galeria Nuno Centeno
- Website: Official website

Nuno Centeno (born 1979) is a Portuguese art dealer, with a contemporary art gallery space in Porto.

Founded by Nuno Centeno, the gallery has established an international program of contemporary art. Galeria Nuno Centeno, originally begun as Reflexus Arte Contemporânea, opened in March 2007 in Porto.

The name changed to Galeria Nuno Centeno in January 2011 and started to represent a group of emerging and established international artists. In 2016, he was included in Artnet's list of "Europe's 10 Most Respected Art Dealers".
