= Gerry Schum =

German filmmaker and video artist

- Born: Gerhard Alexander Schum; 15 September 1938; Cologne, Germany
- Died: 23 March 1973 (aged 34); Düsseldorf, West Germany
- Education: Deutsches Institut für Film und Fernsehen, Munich, Germany; Deutsche Film- und Fernsehakademie, Berlin, Germany
- Known for: video, television production, film production
- Notable work: Fernsehgalerie Gerry Schum (1969–1970)

Gerhard Alexander "Gerry" Schum (15 September 1938 – 23 March 1973) was a German cameraman, filmmaker and Video artist. The TV-exhibitions he produced for his Fernsehgalerie Gerry Schum around 1970 were among the first art programs without any explanation or commentary to be broadcast on television.

== Life and career ==
After studying medicine in 1958, Schum enrolled at the Deutsches Institut für Film und Fernsehen (DIFF) in Munich from 1961 to 1963. During this time, he attended and organized underground film festivals. In 1966 he studied directing at the newly founded Deutsche Film- und Fernsehakademie in Berlin, which he left a year later. Between 1967 and 1969, Schum created two documentaries for Westdeutscher Rundfunk (WDR) III, of which the first one, about the sixth Art Biennale in San Marino, aired on 24 August 1967. The second one, Konsumkunst-Kunstkonsum, was broadcast on 17 October the next year. This film, created in collaboration with art historian Hannah Weitemeier and artist Bernhard Höke, dealt with industrially produced art.

In January 1968, Schum married Weitemeier in New York City, where he also created the film New York. While shooting Konsumkunst-Kunstkonsum in the summer, he met many artists, art dealers and collectors from Cologne and Düsseldorf, among whom his future wife and collaboration partner Ursula Wevers. In September 1968, Schum moved from Berlin to Haan near Düsseldorf, where he married Wevers in July the next year.

Between 1969 and 1970 he established Fernsehgalerie Gerry Schum, a 'TV-gallery' which exhibited Video artworks on television. The first Fernsehausstellung ('TV-exhibition') called Land Art aired on 15 April on Sender Freies Berlin. Later that year, Schum produced Keith Arnatt's project Self-Burial, which was broadcast from 11 to 18 October on WDR III. This work consisted of a series of nine photographs from which one was shown between programs every day for nine days. Around this time, Schum moved into a mobile home with a built-in production studio since he would often work in the field. In December, the Fernsehgalerie exhibited TV as a Fireplace by Jan Dibbets, a three-minute film. It was broadcast by WDR III every evening for seven days on the newly introduced color television. Schum's second Fernsehausstellung, called Identifications, aired in 1970.

In 1971, Schum quit making TV-exhibitions and founded his own gallery dedicated to video art, located at Ratingerstrasse 37 in Düsseldorf. At Videogalerie Schum he produced, exhibited, and sold videotapes. The following year, museum director Paul Vogt consulted him in setting up a video department at Folkwang Museum in Essen. Schum was intended to become the first curator for video art at the museum. He died by suicide in 1973 at the age of 34 in his mobile home on the banks of the Rhine in Düsseldorf.

== Estate and archive ==
The archive of Gerry Schum and Ursula Wevers has been held by the Center for Art and Media Karlsruhe since 2026. It comprises, among other materials, films and videotapes, production documents, correspondence, and further records relating to the Fernsehgalerie Gerry Schum and the videogalerie schum.

== Fernsehausstellung I (1969) and II (1970) ==
Filming for the first TV-exhibition called Land Art started in January 1969, and the 38-minute program aired on 15 April that year on Sender Freies Berlin. This exhibition featured original works by 8 different artists that were created to be shown on television. All works were created and filmed in nature, without any spoken explanation. Michel Heizer withdrew from the Fernsehgalerie after the first broadcast.

Works included in Fernsehausstellung I: Land Art (1969)
| No. | Artist | Title | Filming Date and Location | Technical Aspects |
|---|---|---|---|---|
| 1 | Richard Long | Walking A Straight 10 Mile Line, Forward and Back Shooting Every Half Mile | 20 January 1969, Dartmoor, United Kingdom | 16 mm film, color, sound, 6'03" |
| 2 | Barry Flanagan | Hole in the Sea | February 1969, Scheveningen, the Netherlands | 16 mm film, color (opening and closing credits b/w), sound, 3'44" |
| 3 | Dennis Oppenheim | Time Track | 17 March 1969, 2.00 pm U.S.A., 3.00 pm Canada, Fort Kent, border between United States and Canada | 16 mm film, b/w, sound, 2'07" |
| 4 | Robert Smithson | Fossil Quarry Mirror with Four Mirror Displacements | March 1969, Cayuga Lake region, United States | 16 mm film, b/w, sound, 3'12" |
| 5 | Marinus Boezem | Sand Fountain | January 1969, Camargue, France | 16 mm film, b/w, sound, 4'11" |
| 6 | Jan Dibbets | 12 Hours Tide Object with Correction of Perspective | 1969, unspecified beach in the Netherlands | 16 mm film, b/w, sound, 7'32" |
| 7 | Walter De Maria | Two Lines Three Circles on the Desert | March 1969, Mojave Desert, United States | 16 mm film, b/w, sound, 4'46" |
| 8 | Michael Heizer | Coyote | March 1969, Coyote Dry Lake, United States | 16 mm film, color, sound, 4'20" |

Schum's second Fernsehausstellung, Identifications, was broadcast by Südwestfunk Baden-Baden on 30 November 1970. Twenty artists were represented in this 50-minute production. Only Richard Serra and Keith Sonnier's films were pre-existing works, the others were produced by Schum himself for this TV-exhibition. Daniel Buren and Hamish Fulton withdrew from the project after the first broadcast.

Works included in Fernsehausstellung II: Identifications (1970)
| No. | Artist | Title | Technical Aspects |
|---|---|---|---|
| 1 | Joseph Beuys | Filz TV (1970) | b/w, sound, 11'25" |
| 2 | Reiner Ruthenbeck | Excerpt from Papier (1970) | b/w, sound, 3'40" |
| 3 | Klaus Rinke | Untitled (1970) | b/w, silent, 50" |
| 4 | Ulrich Rückriem | Untitled (1970) | b/w, sound, 55" |
| 5 | Daniel Buren | Untitled (1970) | b/w, silent, 0'49" |
| 6 | Hamish Fulton | Untitled (1970) | b/w, silent, 0'30" |
| 7 | Gilbert & George | Excerpt from The Nature of our Looking (1970) | b/w, sound, 1'25" |
| 8 | Stanley Brouwn | One Step (1970) | b/w, sound, 1'57" |
| 9 | Ger van Elk | The Well Shaven Cactus (1970) | b/w, sound, 1'25" |
| 10 | Giovanni Anselmo | Torstone (1970) | b/w, sound, 1'10" |
| 11 | Alighiero Boetti | Untitled (1970) | b/w, sound, 2'05" |
| 12 | Pier Paolo Calzolari | Untitled (1970) | b/w, sound, 2'12" |
| 13 | Gino De Dominicis | Tentativo di volo (1970) | b/w, sound, 1'55" |
| 14 | Mario Merz | Excerpt from Lumaca (1970) | b/w, sound, 1'20" |
| 15 | Gilberto Zorio | Untitled (1970) | b/w, silent, 1' |
| 16 | Gary Kuehn | Untitled (1970) | b/w, sound, 1'25" |
| 17 | Keith Sonnier | Positive-Negative (1970) | b/w, silent, 2'19" |
| 18 | Richard Serra | Hand Catching Lead (1968) | b/w, silent, 2'54" |
| 19 | Franz Erhard Walther | Untitled (1970) | b/w, sound, 2'05" |
| 20 | Lawrence Weiner | To the Sea, on the Sea, from the Sea, at the Sea, Bordering the Sea (1970) | b/w, sound, 50" |

Schum intended to create a third Fernsehausstellung called Artscapes, but the program did not get approved by any broadcasters and was therefore never realized.

== Exhibitions (selection) ==
- 1969: Prospect 69, Kunsthalle Düsseldorf, Germany
- 1979: Gerry Schum. Stedelijk Museum, Amsterdam, The Netherlands
  - 1980: Museum Boijmans Van Beuningen, Rotterdam, The Netherlands
  - 1980: Kölnische Kunstverein, Cologne, Germany
  - 1980: Museum voor Hedendaagse Kunst, Ghent, Belgium
  - 1980–1981: Vancouver Art Gallery, Canada
  - 1980–1981: A Space Gallery, Toronto, Canada
- 1981: Gerry Schum: Video, Museum of Modern Art, New York City, United States
- 1988: Stationen der Moderne, Martin-Gropius-Bau, Berlin, Germany
- 2003/04: Fernsehgalerie Gerry Schum / Videogalerie Schum, Kunsthalle Düsseldorf, Germany
