= Ludwig Forum für Internationale Kunst =

Art museum in Aachen, Germany

Coordinates: 50°46′52″N 6°6′7″E

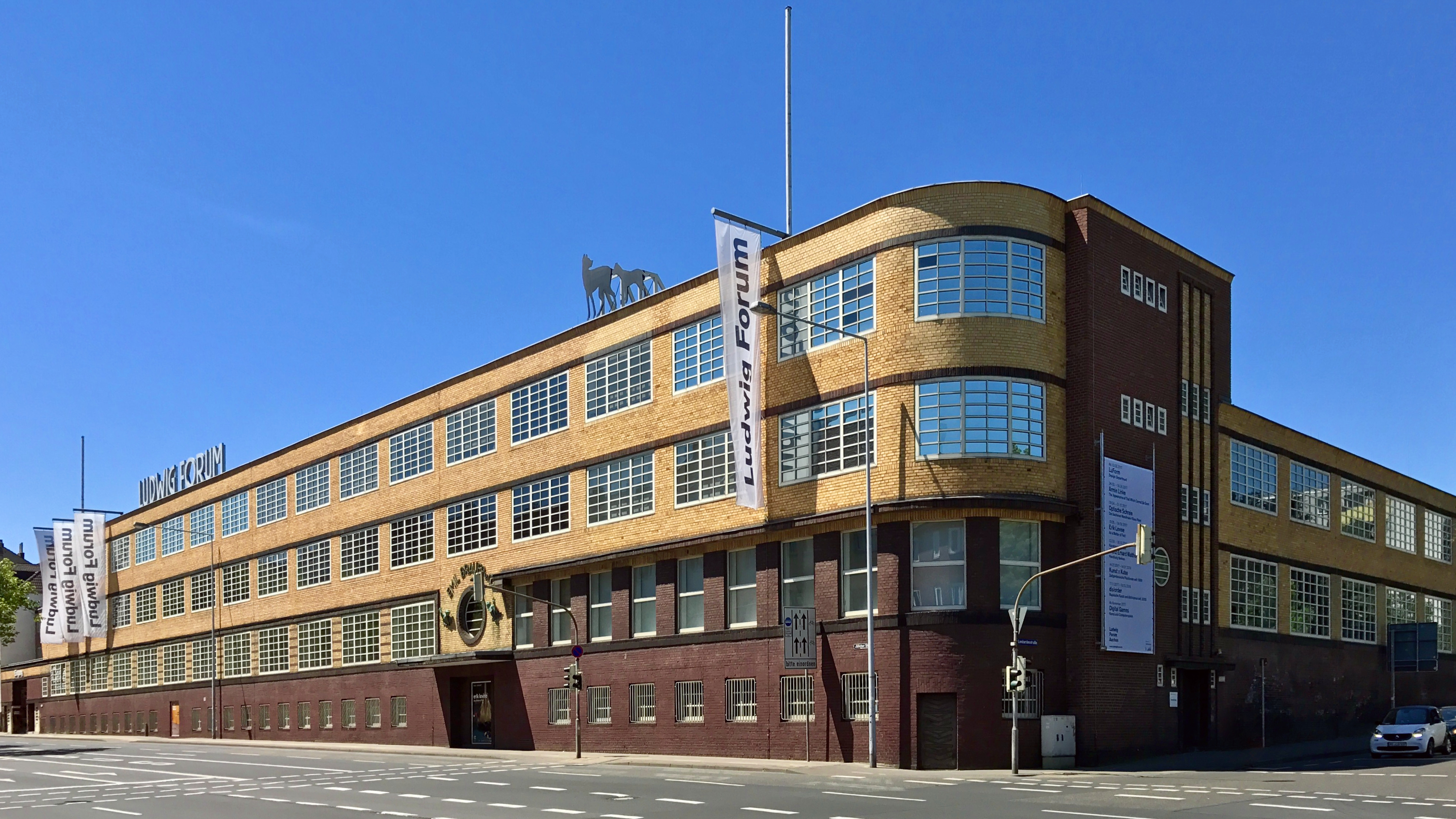
Ludwig Forum for International Art, Aachen

Ludwig Forum für Internationale Kunst, Aachen

The Ludwig Forum for International Art is a museum for modern art in Aachen. It is based on the Ludwig Collection, which was brought together by the Aachen collector couple Irene and Peter Ludwig, and is supported by the Peter and Irene Ludwig Foundation.

== Museum ==
=== History ===
Since 1968, founding director Wolfgang Becker has worked closely with the Ludwig collector couple and in 1970, the municipal museum Neue Galerie - Sammlung Ludwig was founded in Aachen from common ideas. It was one of the first museums for contemporary art in Germany and was originally located in the Alte Kurhaus Aachen. Conservative hostility motivated gynaecologist Hugo Jung and five other professors at RWTH Aachen University to found the Verein der Freunde der Neuen Galerie on 9 February 1971. In 1991, the museum moved into the rooms of Emil Brauer, an umbrella factory built in 1928 in the international style and shut down in 1988, and henceforth called itself the Ludwig Forum for International Art. The Friends of the Ludwig Forum was formed from the friends' association.

Since the move, the museum has focused on contemporary art. By 2011, the number of visitors had increased to around 55,000 per year.

=== Collection ===
The Ludwig Forum's collection comprises more than 3,000 works, mainly from the collection of the collectors Peter and Irene Ludwig, from all genres of art and from many countries. The Ludwig Collection is particularly well known for its pop art collections and its focus on American art since the 1960s. In 1977, the collector couple first showed Pop Art in East Berlin. This led to a lively exchange with artists from Eastern Germany. In the 1980s and 1990s, the Ludwigs traveled to Russia and soon began collecting contemporary Soviet and Chinese art. Today, many of these positions and artist personalities are world famous, such as Ilya Kabakov, Erik Bulatov, Huang Yong Ping and Ai Weiwei. In addition, an important collection of video art was built up in the house, which today has some 200 works of art in the city.

Some of the works that the Ludwig Forum houses are not missing in any encyclopedia on modern art history and thus belong to a kind of world memory of 20th century art. These include, for example, the photorealistic painting Medici by Franz Gertsch or the sculpture group Bowery Bums by Duane Hanson, which shows three beggars of the Bowery in Manhattan. Both works were exhibited in 1972 at the now legendary documenta 5 by Harald Szeemann in Kassel. Hanson also produced the Mona-Lisa from Aachen, a hyper-realistic sculpture of a woman with a shopping trolley, affectionately known as the Supermarket Lady. Jonathan Borofsky's ballerina clown, which is set up in the courtyard of the Ludwig Forum, also looks far into history and over the continents. He has a twin in Los Angeles, set up on the roof of the Public Library of Santa Monica, directly on the Pacific Ocean. The clown was originally created for the Metropolis show, which is now regarded as the benchmark among experts. It was shown at the beginning of 1991 in the Gropius Bau in Berlin and from which the work for Aachen was acquired on the occasion of the reopening of the Ludwig Forum in the summer of the same year.

The video archive of the Ludwig Forum comprises a collection of approximately 200 video works by video artists such as Klaus vom Bruch, Peter Campus, Douglas Davis, Joan Jonas, Bruce Nauman, Nam June Paik, Ulrike Rosenbach, Wolf Vostell and William Wegman.

In addition to solo and group exhibitions of internationally renowned artists, the Ludwig Forum 2010 presented contemporary architecture for the first time under the title West Arch - A new Generation in Architecture. In 2011, the Ludwig Forum for International Art celebrated its 20th anniversary. The exhibitions Hyper Real - Kunst und Amerika um 1970 and Nie wieder störungsfrei - Aachen Avantgarde from 1964 onwards, covering the history of the museum and the collection to current artistic positions and issues, concluded the exhibition.

=== Administration ===
- Founding director Wolfgang Becker was in office from 1970 to 2001. Under his supervision, important exhibitions have taken place, such as Cliché/antique (1970), Robert Filliou: Commemor (1970) and the Havana Biennial (1998).
- From 2002 to 2008, Harald Kunde led the Ludwig Forum's fortunes and positioned the institution with monographic exhibitions of well-known contemporary artists such as Sophie Calle (2005), Franz Gertsch (2006), Chuck Close (2007) and the Atelier van Lieshout (2008).
- Brigitte Franzen was director of the Ludwig Forum from 2009 to 2015. The exhibition programme and the presentation of the collection at this time were based on annual leitmotifs, such as the 2009 video/film and 2010 architecture and space. In this context, the Ludwig Forum has positioned itself as an exhibition house and museum with a transdisciplinary profile. Franzen left the Forum to serve as the new managing director of the Peter and Irene Ludwig Foundation.
- Andreas Beitin has been director of the Ludwig Forum since February 2016. He was attracted by the challenge and work with the renowned collection of the house. However, he has refrained from presenting the collection in his own new way in favour of temporary exhibitions. Beitin's mission is to further develop the Ludwig Forum as a living house.

=== Exhibitions (selection) ===
- 2016–2017: Mies van der Rohe - The collages from the MoMA (curators Andreas Beitin and Holger Otten)
- 2017: LuForm - Design Department
- 2017: Erik Levine - As a Matter of Fact
- 2017: Franz Erhard Walther - Handlung denken
- 2017: Art X Cuba - Contemporary Positions since 1989
- 2017–2018: dis/order. Art and Activism in Russia since 2000, (17. November 2017 bis 18. February 2018)
- 2018: Flashes of the Future - The Art of the ’68ers or The Power of the Powerless

=== Building ===
The umbrella factory Brauer, Jülicher Straße 97-109, is a two- and three-storey building by the architects Josef Bachmann and Alexander Lürken from 1928, which was listed in 1977 as 3-storey skeleton building with rounded corners and flat roof; the facades are yellow bricked, the base with red clinker facing. The building, which was rather atypical for Aachen in its time, was borrowed from the Bauhaus style with its very striking designs. Typical features include the play with basic geometric shapes, such as the round window above the former main entrance.

In 1988, the building was fundamentally rebuilt and restored according to the designs of Aachen architect Fritz Eller.

=== Gallery ===
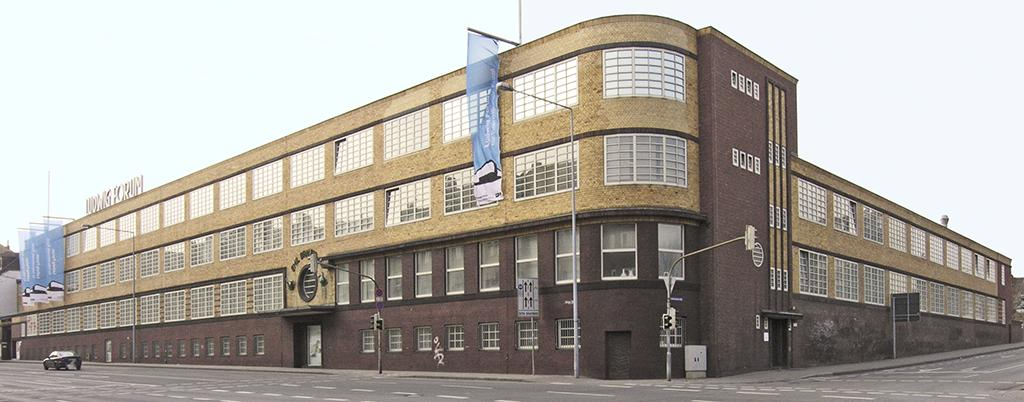
Ludwigforum für Internationale Kunst 2005

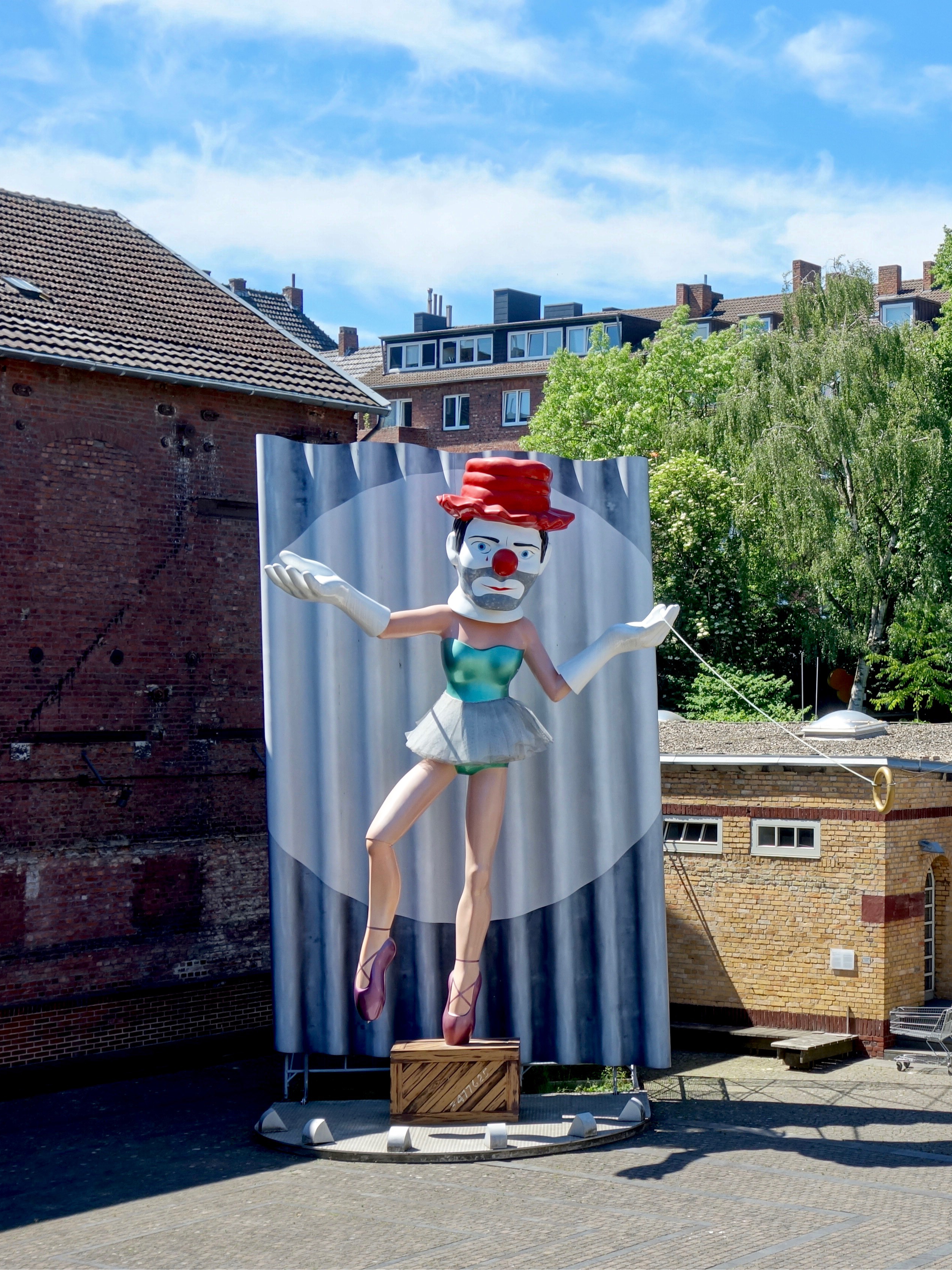
Ballerina Clown from Jonathan Borofsky at the Ludwig Forum für Internationale Kunst
