= Natalie Bieser =

American artist (born 1948)

- Born: 1948 (age 76–77); Grand Junction, Colorado, United States
- Other names: Natalie Bieser Goode, Natalie Bieser Collison
- Education: Chouinard Art Institute, California Institute of the Arts, (BFA)
- Occupation: Visual artist
- Known for: Watercolor paintings, assemblage
- Spouse: Joe Goode (m. 1978–?)
- Website: www.nataliebieser.com

Natalie Bieser (born 1948) is an American contemporary artist, known for her watercolor paintings and assemblage. She lives in Santa Fe, New Mexico, and previously lived in Los Angeles.

Bieser was a participant in Documenta 5 in Kassel in 1972, with wall objects made with strings of beads.

Her work is included in the collections of the Virginia Museum of Fine Arts, and the Whitney Museum of American Art. She married painter Joe Goode in 1978.
