= Stephen Posen =

- Born: 1939 (age 86–87); St. Louis, MO
- Education: Washington University; Yale University
- Website: www.stephenposen.com

Stephen Posen (born 1939) is an American painter and photographer who works in both New York City and Bucks County, Pennsylvania.

== Early life ==
Posen studied painting at Washington University, where he earned his BFA in 1962. Posen continued on to graduate studies at Yale University earning his MFA in 1964. At Yale, Posen was a part of a great confluence of talents including Brice Marden, Richard Serra, Nancy Graves and Chuck Close. After graduate school, Posen spent two years in Italy on a Fulbright Fellowship.

== Career ==
In 1966, Posen moved to New York City and became an integral part of the Soho art scene of the 1960s and 1970s, well-known for his Photorealism work. Posen's Photorealism works were exhibited in one-man exhibitions at Ivan Karp's OK Harris Gallery in 1969, 1971 and 1974, at Robert Miller Gallery in 1978, and in group exhibitions including the Sidney Janis Gallery and the 1972 Documenta V exhibition in Kassel, Germany, and the Yale University Art Gallery in 1974. Salvador Dalí and Andy Warhol were a few of the many supporters of Posen's early work. In 2018, select work from the 1960s and 1970s including his "Fabric over Boxes" and "Cutouts" series were exhibited at Vito Schnabel Projects in New York City, and at the Vito Schnabel Gallery in St. Moritz, Switzerland.

Beginning in the 1980s, Posen expanded into other stylistic approaches and mediums including drawing, trompe-l'oeil compositions, cartoon and pop culture iconography, mixed media, and photography. Posen had one-man exhibitions at the Jason McCoy Gallery in New York City in 1986 and 1990. In recent years Posen exhibited at the Drawing Center and the Deutsche Guggenheim in Berlin, Germany.

Posen has delved deeply into photography. "Ellipsis: Dual Vision," a book of his paired photographs, was published in 2015.

Posen has developed a visual language that moves freely between personal poetry and art historical references. His practice is one of constant reinvention that cannot be categorized as either figurative or abstract.

Posen's work is recognized in museum collections including the Museum of Modern Art (MoMA) and the Solomon R. Guggenheim Museum in New York City, and the Pennsylvania Academy of Fine Art (PAFA) in Philadelphia, Pennsylvania, and the Nelson- Atkins Museum in Kansas City, Missouri.

== Publications ==
- Stephen Posen: New Paintings. New York: Jason McCoy Gallery, 1990. Introduction by Lauren Sedofsky.
- Stephen Posen: Drawings 2003–2005. New York: Stephen Posen, 2006. Essay by Dore Ashton and Raphael Rubinstein.
- Stephen Posen: Dancer/Mirror. New York: The Drawing Center, 2006. Essay by Dore Ashton.
- Stephen Posen: Paint/Photo. New York: Churner and Churner, 2012. Exhibition catalogue.
- Ellipsis: Dual Vision. New York: Glitterati, 2015. ISBN 978-0-9903808-4-9. Texts by Alexandra Posen, Colin Cheney, Scott Indrisek, Zac Posen.
- Stephen Posen: Threads: Paintings from the 1960s and 1970s. Vito Schnabel Gallery, 2018. Exhibition catalogue. ISBN 978-0-9987228-6-3. Essay by Alex Bacon.
