= Hans Neuendorf =

German entrepreneur and art dealer

- Born: 1937 (age 88–89); Hamburg, Germany
- Occupations: Art gallery founder; art exhibitor; art dealer; entrepreneur; writer
- Years active: 1964–present

Hans Neuendorf (born 1937) is a German art gallery founder, art dealer and entrepreneur, he has also released several publications.

== Biography ==
=== Early life ===
Neuendorf was born in 1937 in Hamburg, Germany and grew up during the World War II. He started in the art business as a teenager by hitchhiking to Paris to purchase fine art prints by modernist Marc Chagall and Fernand Leger, which he took back to Hamburg to sell.

=== Art gallery and exhibitions ===
Neuendorf founded his first art gallery Galerie Neuendorf, in 1964 and hosting the first art pop exhibition in Germany. In 1967 he co-founded the first-ever art fair, which took place in Cologne, Germany. As an art dealer, Neuendorf mounted dozens of critically acclaimed exhibitions featuring seminal artists including Georg Baselitz, Cy Twombly, David Hockney, Francis Picabia, Lucio Fontana, and more. Neuendorf has cited his favourite artist as Cy Twombly.

=== Artnet.com ===
He founded the online website Artnet, a database of art prices, which became the first art site to go online in 1989. In 2012, he handed over the role of chief executive of the business to his son, Jacob Pabst. Two of his sons and daughter Sophie are also involved in the company, serving as vice president. Neuendorf became involved in the industry when he traveled to France in the 1960s. Artnet has also formed partnerships with the auction house Sotheby's.

Its sister project Artnet Magazine was after (Slate) the second publication to go online.

== Publications ==
- Georg Baselitz: Ein neuer Typ (Bilder 1965–66). Text: Günther Gercken. Hamburg 1973.
- Jörg Immendorf: Teilbau. Texte: R. H. Fuchs und Johannes Gachnang. Hamburg 1981.
- Georg Baselitz: Zeichnungen 1961–1983. Texte: Günther Gercken und Franz Dahlem. Hamburg 1983.
- Christa Dichgans: Bilder 1981–1983. Text: A. R. Penck. Hamburg 1987.
- Lucio Fontana: 60 Werke aus den Jahren 1938–1960. Text: Katharina Hegewisch. Frankfurt/M. 1987.
- Leon Golub. Text: Janis Hendrickson. Ausstellungskatalog Frankfurt/M. 1987.
- Picabia 1879–1953. Texte: Timothey Clifford und Richard Calvocoressi. In collaboration with the National Gallery of Modern Art, Edinburgh. Frankfurt/M. 1988.
- Georg Baselitz: Adler. 53 Gouachen + Zeichnungen. Text: Günther Gercken. In collaboration with Galerie Buchmann. Frankfurt/M. 1988.
- Georg Baselitz: 100 Zeichnungen + Gouachen. Frankfurt/M. 1989.
- Emilio Vedova. Text: Katharina Hegewisch. Catalogue, Frankfurt/M. 1989.
- David Hockney: Neue Bilder. Text: Anders Stephenson. Catalogue, Frankfurt/M. 1989.
- Robert Graham: Statues. Text: John McEwen. Frankfurt/M. 1990.
- Richard Artschwager: Gemälde, Skulpturen, Zeichnungen, Multiples. Text: Catherine Kord. Catalogue, Frankfurt/M. 1990.
- Morris Louis. Ausstellungskatalog Frankfurt/M. 1991.
- Duane Hanson: Sculptures. Texte: Karl Ruhrberg und Eckart Britsch. Catalogue, Frankfurt/M. 1992.
- Georg Karl Pfahler. Texte: Gerd Winkler und Hans J. Müller. Catalogue, Frankfurt/M. 1992.
- Billy Al Bengston: Malerei als visuelles Tagebuch. Text: Karen Tsujimoto. Frankfurt/M. 1993.
- Bernd Koberling: Ausgewählte Bilder 1963–1989. Texte: Eckart Britsch und Günther Gercken, 1989.
- Bernd Koberling. Ausgewählte Bilder 1991–1993. Texte: Eckart Britsch und Günther Gercken, 1993.
