= Donatella Mazzoleni =

Italian architect

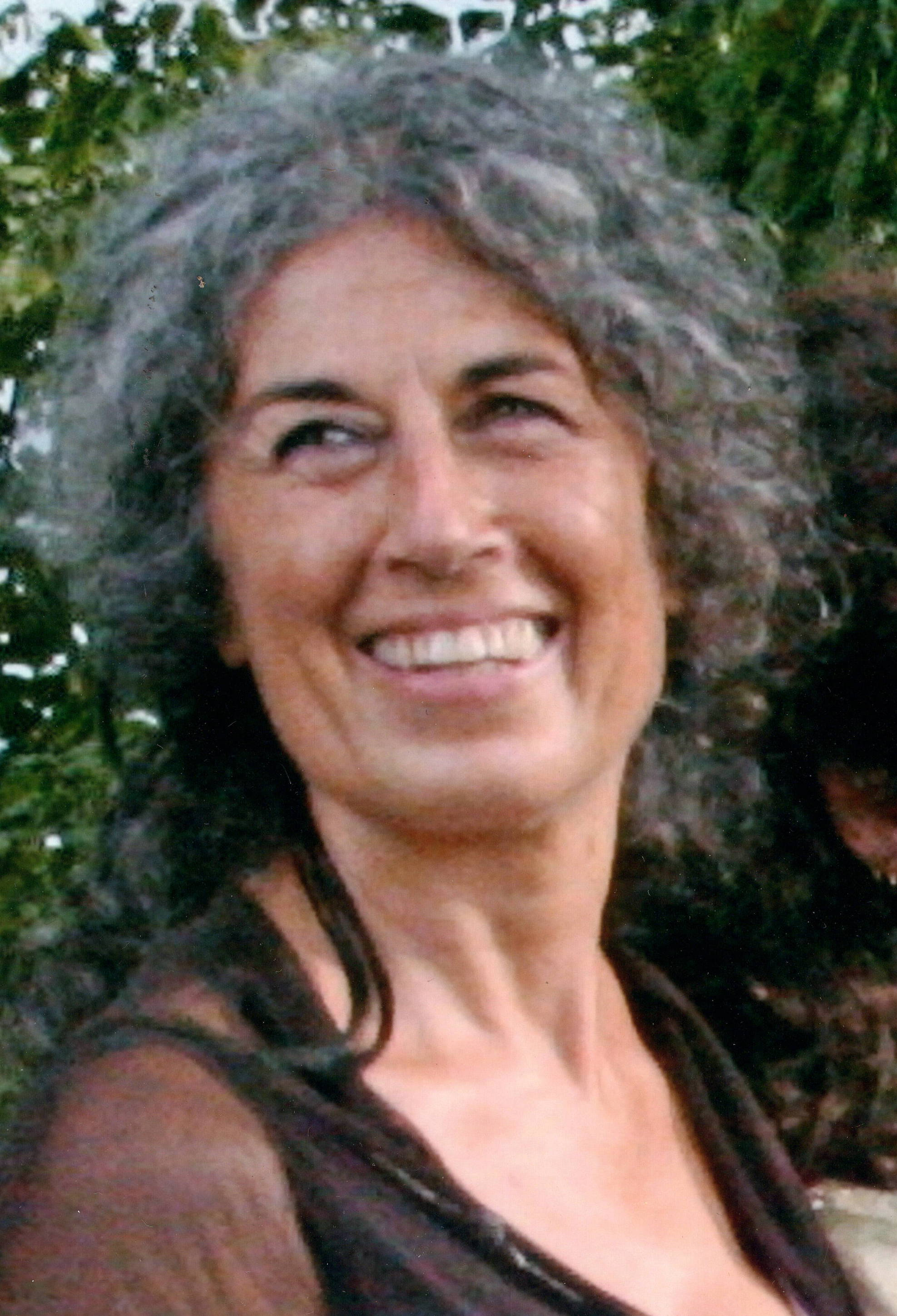
- Born: 14 May 1943 (age 83); Florence, Italy
- Education: PhD in Architecture, University of Naples Federico II
- Occupation: Architect

Donatella Mazzoleni (14 May 1943 in Florence, Italy) is an Italian architect and academic. She is a professor of Building design and has worked in architectural theory and urban design.

== Life and work ==
Mazzoleni studied architecture at the University of Naples Federico II, graduating in 1967. She subsequently undertook study trips across Europe, Asia, Africa, the Americas, and Australia.

She served as a professor of architectural design at the University of Naples and taught at various universities internationally. Her work has focused on Building design, urban planning, landscape architecture, Exhibit design, historical building research, and museum design.

From the 1960s, Mazzoleni collaborated with the Italian architect Aldo Rossi on the concept of the “Vertical City”, an experimental urban model proposing the concentration of urban functions within large-scale high-rise structures. The project envisaged self-contained buildings integrating production, distribution, transportation, and residential functions.

In 1972, she and Rossi presented this concept at Documenta 5 in Kassel, in the section “Parallel Visual Worlds: Utopia and Planning”, where it was shown through models and drawings.
