= Thomas Kovachevich =

American artist (born 1942)

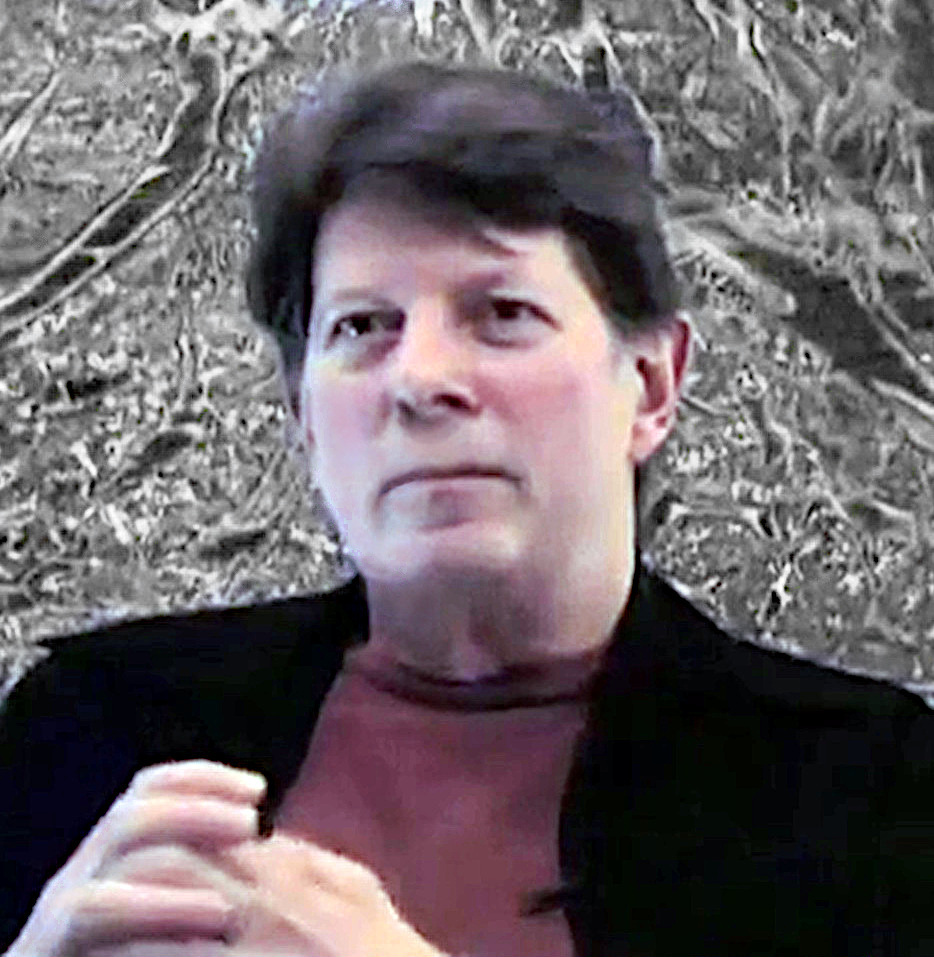
- Kovachevich Not Just a Row of Paintings 2012
- Born: March 11, 1942 (age 84); Detroit, Michigan
- Education: Michigan State University
- Known for: performance, installation, painting, sculpture, medicine

Thomas Kovachevich (born March 11, 1942) is an American contemporary visual artist and physician. Kovachevich's art practice is multi-faceted; exhibitions of paintings, sculptures, installations and performances have represented the lexicon of this artist.

Kovachevich earned a B.A. in social science at Michigan State University and received his medical diploma and board certification in Family Medicine at the Chicago Osteopathic School of Medicine where he became inspired by ordinary medical materials and began making small sculptures with tape, cotton balls, suture thread, gauze, glass microscope slides, tissue, etc.

In 1971, Kovachevich began his medical practice in Chicago. For the next thirty years medicine and art enhanced and intertwined both practices.

Kovachevich has lived and worked in New York City since 1983.

== Early work: 1960s and 1970s ==
The small sculptures were shown in 1969 at the Detroit Institute of Arts in an exhibition curated by Sam Wagstaff. In 1970 an exhibition of cardboard boxes and screens made of foam core were exhibited at the Museum of Modern Art in the Penthouse Gallery, curated by Pierre Apraxine.

At the 1972 documenta 5, curated by Harald Szeemann, the small sculptures were packed into a vintage hat box and exhibited in the Individual Mythology section of the exhibition in Kassel, Germany. The Hat Box traveled to the 1973 Biennale de Paris and the Musee de peinture et de Sculpture in Grenoble. In 1975 the curator A. James Speyer showed the sculptures in the Small Scale in Contemporary Art exhibition at the Art Institute of Chicago.

During this time Kovachevich became colleagues with artists Thomas Shannon, Balthasar Burkhard, Markus Raetz, Richard Tuttle, Walter De Maria, James Lee Byars and Scott Burton.

Kovachevich painted shadows in his first solo museum exhibition at the MCA Chicago in 1973, titled Rooms and Shadows. In 1976, paper cut-outs and gels attached to medical light boxes were exhibited in the Abstract Art in Chicago exhibition at the MCA Chicago. Paper wall installations realized from paper packaging tape made their debut to Kovachevich's body of work. The paper tape reacted in constant movement, opening and closing according to the given moisture in the air.

Performance art made a large impact on Kovachevich's practice after developing and receiving a patent, ‘Method to effect a continuous movement of a fibrous material,’ fueled by the power of evaporation. Kovachevich coined the term "K - Motion", meaning constant motion. With water, paper and a fabric, the movement of cut paper shapes acted out a "story." As the costume, set and lighting designer, Kovachevich also considered himself an observer like the audience. In 1977 Kovachevich developed a book and table top theater, K - Motion: Paper Comes Alive with an introduction by Peter Schjeldahl.

=== Exhibitions and performances ===
Artist residency at Art Park, in Lewiston, NY, daily performance in a silo, 1976
A six-week performance series at the Drawing Center, NY, 1977.
First solo exhibition in NY involving both performance and sculpture, at Droll/ Kolbert Gallery in 1978.
Notre Dame University, Hyde Park Art Center, Daley’s Tomb, Name Gallery, 1977,
A View of the Decade, MCA, Chicago, 1977,
Beyond Object, Aspen Center for the Visual Arts, 1977

== 1980s ==
In 1980, Kovachevich had his first solo gallery exhibition in Bern, Switzerland at the Toni Gerber Gallery. Four performance paintings that were made at the opening are in the collection of the Kunstmuseum Bern. Betsy Rosenfield Gallery in Chicago exhibited performance paintings in a solo exhibition in 1981.

In 1983, Kovachevich had exhibitions and performances at the Kunstmuseum Bern, Kunstmuseum Basel, and Hotel Wolfers/Herman Daled in Brussels. An artist residency in 1985 at the Vera and Albert List Art Center at MIT produced a four-week series of collaborative performances with scientists and professors and an exhibition of paintings.

In 1988 Kovachevich spent a year in France and Switzerland at the invitation of the Musee d’art et Histoire in Geneva, and the CIRVA (Center for Investigation and Research of Glass) in Marseille, where a series of glass sculptures were produced and exhibited at the Centre de la Vielle Charite, 1988. Museums in France and Asia have exhibited the glass.

=== Exhibitions and performances ===
Farideh Cadot Galerie, NY/ Paris
Dart Gallery, Chicago
Baskerville Watson, NY
MCA Chicago
Musée d'Art et d'Histoire (Geneva).

== 1990s ==
In 1990, Kovachevich collaborated with Jay Chiat, a collector and creator of Chiat/Day Advertising Agency, on a nationwide service titled ‘’Doctors’s By Phone’’. Kovachevich considered the project an artwork and described it as ‘conceptual realism.’ In an interview with Terri Sultan in 1991, for the catalogue of the exhibition, ‘’Thomas Kovachevich: Seeing Invisible Things’’ at the Corcoran Gallery of Art, Kovachevich said, "Conceptual realism refers to ideas as solutions to real problems, rather than to what we know as the conceptual art that developed in the 70’s, which was centered in pure idea." Doctor's By Phone provided a way for doctors to be available for consultation 24 hours a day by phone. A page in the Corcoran catalogue for the exhibition was a reprint from a full page ad in the New York Times for Doctor’s By Phone. The project received national press and media coverage.

=== Exhibitions and performances ===
Francesca Pia Gallery, 1996, Bern
Curt Marcus Gallery, 1991, NY
The Corcoran Gallery of Art, 1991, Washington DC
The French Embassy, 1999, NY
Galerie Berggruen, 1994, Paris
New Acquisitions show at the Musee d’art Contemporain de Marseille, 1997

== 2000s to present ==
In 2002, painted vacuumed-formed plastics were exhibited in a solo exhibition, Paper/Plastic/Paint at the Santa Monica Museum of Contemporary Art. Kovachevich exhibited painted Images of the plastics at Lightbox, LA in 2007.

In 2008 at the Zentrum Paul Klee in Bern, Kovachevich installed Self Portrait, a paper installation of his own DNA in a group show, Genesis. Kovachevich originally exhibited Self Portrait in 1992 at the Curt Marcus Gallery in NY.

In 2010 Kovachevich performed at midnight in Inchoative Listening + Centerless Portrayal, a day of performances curated by Jay Sanders at The Sculpture Center, Long Island City.

In 2012, Kovachevich had a solo exhibition showing his glass sculptures at the Abbey of Silvacane in La Roque d’Anthéron, France. Another solo show in 2012, Alpenglow, at Showroom 170 exhibited Kovachevich's paper gels on paper and a large scale paper tape ribbon installation. The gels are in the collection of the Hammer Museum, LA, where they were exhibited in 2013.

A group of cardboard and corrugated plastic sculptures were exhibited in 2014 at Showroom Gowanus and Callicoon Fine Arts NY, Lime Juice at Galerie de France in 2014, Paris, and Define at Tif Sigfrids in LA, 2016.

In 2016 a projection of Delancey Street was shown at Callicoon Fine Arts, NY, in a solo exhibition, January to February 2016. Later that year, Kovachevich exhibited a group of 12 x 12 inch paintings in Dark Star, a group show curated by Raymond Foye at Planthouse, NY in 2016. Other 12 x 12 paintings have been consistently exhibited at Callicoon Fine Arts, NY since 2014.

Thomas Kovachevich has been represented by Callicoon Fine Arts, NY since 2011.
