= Herbert Distel =

Herbert Distel, 2008

Herbert Distel (born 7 August 1942 in Bern) is a Swiss painter, sculptor, photographer, filmmaker and composer currently residing in Katzelsdorf near Vienna Austria. He is primarily known for his sculpture, sound art and conceptual art.

== Biography ==
Herbert Distel studied lithography in Paris at École nationale supérieure des Beaux-Arts from 1963 to 1964 and started creating sculptures with geometrical forms in the mid-1960s. Between 1968 and 1969, he started creating egg sculptures and in 1970 he launched a 3m long polyester egg on the West African coast that reached the Trinidad coast seven months later (Projekt Canaris). The same year he installed a 22-ton granite egg sculpture along the road from Basel to Chiasso entitled Monument Canaris.

From 1970 to 1977, he started working on his landmark 'Museum of Drawers' (Das Schubladenmuseum), a found cabinet with 20 drawers each containing 25 tiny rooms where he invited living artists to contribute a miniature work of art. Artists included were: Arnulf Rainer, Carolee Schneemann, Christian Megert, Pablo Picasso, Robert Cottingham, Billy Al Bengston, Joseph Beuys, John Baldessari, Carl Andre, Chuck Close, Tom Blackwell, Tom Phillips, Joe Goode, Charles Arnoldi, Camille Billops, Nam June Paik, Frederick J. Brown, Robyn Denny, Valie Export, Mel Ramos, Edward Ruscha, Dieter Roth and John Cage. The Museum of Drawers was first exhibited at Documenta 5 (Kassel, Germany) in 1972 and later at the Cooper-Hewitt Museum (New York, United States). Contemporaneously George Maciunas was working on his Fluxus Flux Cabinet (1975–77).

From 1985-1987, Distel studied in Berlin with polish film makers Krzysztof Kieslowski and Edward Zebrowski. In 1993, Distel and Peter Guyer completed the video die angst die macht die bilder des zauberlehrlings, based on found footage.

In 2003, Herbert Distel launched his Imagerie project, a cabinet of 20 drawers containing the name of 320 artists on clear plastic sheets.

== Soundwork ==
Distel's first sound art work was the LP We Have A Problem (1971) based on NASA recordings of Apollo 13 astronauts that were mixed with a live rendition of George Gershwin's Rhapsody In Blue' as played by the pianist: Peter Aronsky. In 1973, he completed the sound work The Love Room and later used it in his first short film A Pornographic Movie (1974).

Distel was included in Morgan Fisher's 1980 Miniatures compilation (the aural equivalent to the Museum of Drawers) with a track called Toscany In Blue (Last Minute).

== Die Reise (1985) ==
In between 1984 and 1985, Distel worked on Die Reise (The Trip), a stunning train and railroad field recording montage. Location recordings were made in the Zürich-Bern Intercity on a trip he recorded ten times to get the source material. Die Reise starts and is based on the train sound counterpointing with singing cicadas as well as birds and human voices. It seems the composer is recording the voice of the train to add to the choir of cicadas, birds, hissing electronic sounds and human voices. Ultimately this tour de force of musique concrète technique can also be considered as a paean to the Swiss railroad. In his liner notes to the 2003 CD reissue, Peter Niklas Wilson compared the music to Pierre Schaeffer's musique concrète.

== La Stazione (1990) ==
From 1986 to 1989, Distel took a series of photographs in the Staglieno Genoa cemetery in Italy - photographic close-ups of marble sculptures and tombs. The series was exhibited in 1990 in Bern with accompanying poems from Edgar Lee Masters's Spoon River Anthology. The cover for 'La Stazione' (The Station) is excerpted from this series. Source recordings for this sound work - a masterpiece of ambient musique concrète - were made in Milan's Central Station in 1987 with the help of his wife Gil Distel. It was created according to the model of Mario Peragallo's own opera La Collina (1947), itself based on the Spoon River Anthology, so that each part is dedicated to a certain Italian personality:

- Trecentocinquantatre to Arturo Schwarz - a Milanese art dealer and Marcel Duchamp specialist
- Torino-Ritardo to Malwida von Meysenbug - who introduced Lou Salome to the philosopher Friedrich Nietzsche
- Capocaponeralearti to Federico Paternina - a Rioja Spanish wine maker
- Transeuropexpress to Teresita Fontana - widow of the artist Lucio Fontana
- Diretto - Binario sette to Valeria Manzoni - mother of the artist Piero Manzoni

La Stazione can thus be considered an homage to Italian art and way of life, as Distel actually lived in Italy for some time. The five parts' subtitles are based on the train station's PA announcements.

The music is continuous, so that telling which part is which can prove difficult. One hears recordings of clattering trains slowly stopping on arrival, doors of cars shutting, PA announcements, whistles, people running to get their train. The sounds have been processed and layered – sometimes beyond recognition – to make the industrial sounds mingle in a surreal soundscape. The technique is well-known (drastically slowed-down speed, multi-layering, echo and reverb sound effects, pitch modification), but the result is totally unique. A reviewer compared the music on LA Stazione to Pauline Oliveros's own Deep Listening music.

Created 1987–90, La Stazione was premiered on Radio DRS 2 Bern, Switzerland, on May 16, 1990.

== Soundtrack (2004) ==
Originally commissioned in 2004 by a Japanese choreographer, this remix version of Herbert Distel's own Die Reise and La Stazione was broadcast on ORF, WDR and Deutschlandradio in 2007–8, but remains unreleased on disc format at time of writing. Composed for dancers and video, this Soundtrack (pun intended I assume) is a subtle and nuanced mix enhancing details from the originals and adding dramaturgy in the process. The result is a kind of psychological soundscape and less of a train trip or portrait of a train station, since the train sounds are used as a rhythm element here and no more as a psychological, hypnotysing sound. Actually the train sounds only appear 15 minutes into the mix, evidence of a new direction given to the whole project. The work is divided in 2 parts, the first one (till 39:00) being a remixing of Die Reise whilst the 2nd part (starting 39:00) is sourced from La Stazione.

The 15mns opening sequence is a kind of surreal vocals+insect chorale. A female singer returns at 23:00-24:00, a heavenly voice amid the concrète music sounds. Generally speaking, this mix stays true to the original La Stazione project, that is to say an opera (i.e. a composition for voices), enhancing and stressing the role of vocals in these 2 sound pieces. Another prominent element are the numerous electronic sounds brought into focus compared to the originals. Distel deliberately re-install his sound work in the electronic and musique concrète canon. And maybe the cheerful motorcycle engine at 47:30 signals another, noisier trip altogether. Obviously Soundtrack is a fine addition to the 2 previous works on train sounds and the ensemble makes for a perfect trilogy.
