= Museum Franz Gertsch =

Museum collection in Burgdorf in the canton of Bern, Switzerland

Coordinates: 47°03′29″N 7°37′30″E

Museum Franz Gertsch is an art museum in Burgdorf, Switzerland.

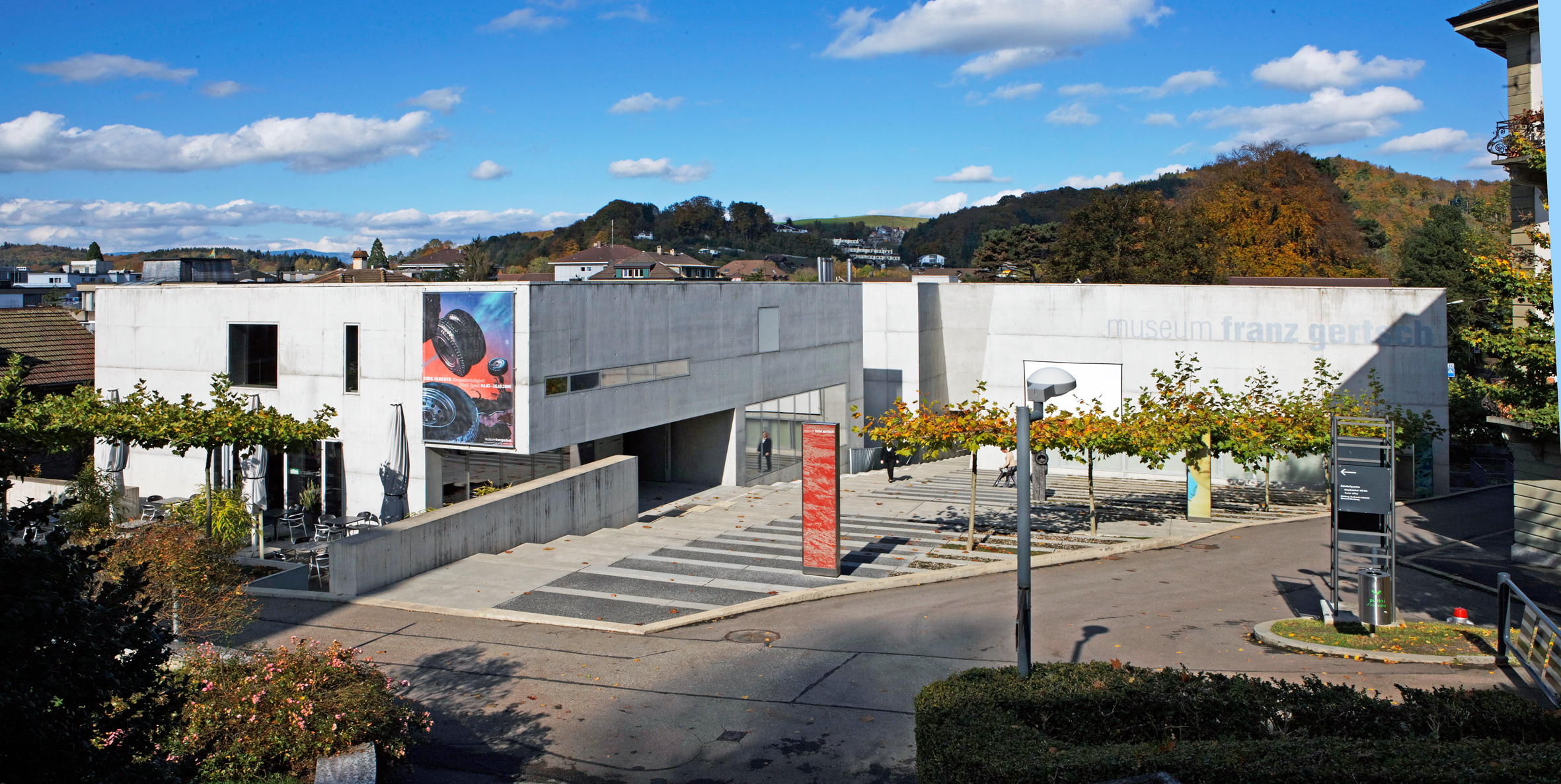
Burgdorf (Switzerland), Museum Franz Gertsch

== The architecture ==
In close cooperation with Franz Gertsch, the Swiss architects Hansueli Jörg and Martin Sturm designed exhibition spaces that are aligned in their function with reference to the works on display.The museum building, completed in 2002, is divided into two exposed concrete cubes, which stand at right angles to one another and surround a museum garden. The total exhibition area of some 1000 metres^{2}. (10,000 sq ft) is divided into five clearly proportioned rooms. With the material selection reduced to the minimum, the rooms appear as pure white cubes and stand entirely in the service of the works displayed. Apart from the exhibition rooms, there is a 50-seat artcafé at the visitors' disposal, and a video lounge, where a documentary on Franz Gertsch is shown during the day.

== The collection ==
In 1998, the Burgdorf industrialist Willy Michel made a decision, together with Franz Gertsch, to create a museum to be maintained by them both. Willy Michel secured the financing for the entire project and established the willy michel foundation, which provides the basis for the museum's collection. This collection comprises the complete works of Franz Gertsch dating from the past 20 years. These specifically include the paintings Silvia I and Gräser I-IV (Grasses I-IV) as well as many woodcuts, among them several large-scale triptychs. In addition, the museum expands its collection through the loan of additional works from other museums or privately, as well as attempting to purchase further works.

== Temporary exhibitions ==
Besides the presentation of Franz Gertsch's works, the museum is a regular venue for temporary exhibitions of a wide spectrum of contemporary art. Contemporaries and comparable younger colleagues, also contrasting approaches to reality are the exhibition themes, with the crossover between painting and photography giving a further emphasis.

== See also ==
- List of museums in Switzerland
