= Baudouin Oosterlynck =

Belgian composer, sound artist and visual artist (born 1946)

Baudouin Oosterlynck (born November 19, 1946, in Kortrijk) is a Belgian composer, sound artist and visual artist. He is notable for his early musique concrète works and his later installation pieces and objets d'art. Among his works are a series of 23 preludes, 3 overtures, 5 oratorios, and a sonata, collectively known as Variations du silence, that consist of recordings of the ambient sound in particular locations selected by the composer. He has also designed a variety of highly sensitive instruments for listening.

== Discography ==
- 1975-1978, 4 LP box / 4 CD box, Metaphon 001, 2008 + 78 page booklet : prepared piano, voice, objects

== Honours, decorations, awards and distinctions ==
He has been a member of the Royal Academy of Science, Letters and Fine Arts of Belgium since 2007.
