= Art fair =

Art fair may refer to:

- Art exhibition, a space in which art objects meet an audience
- Arts festival, a festival that can encompass a wide range of art genres
- The Art Fair, a 1996 American novel by David Lipsky
