= Riva Castleman =

American art historian & curator

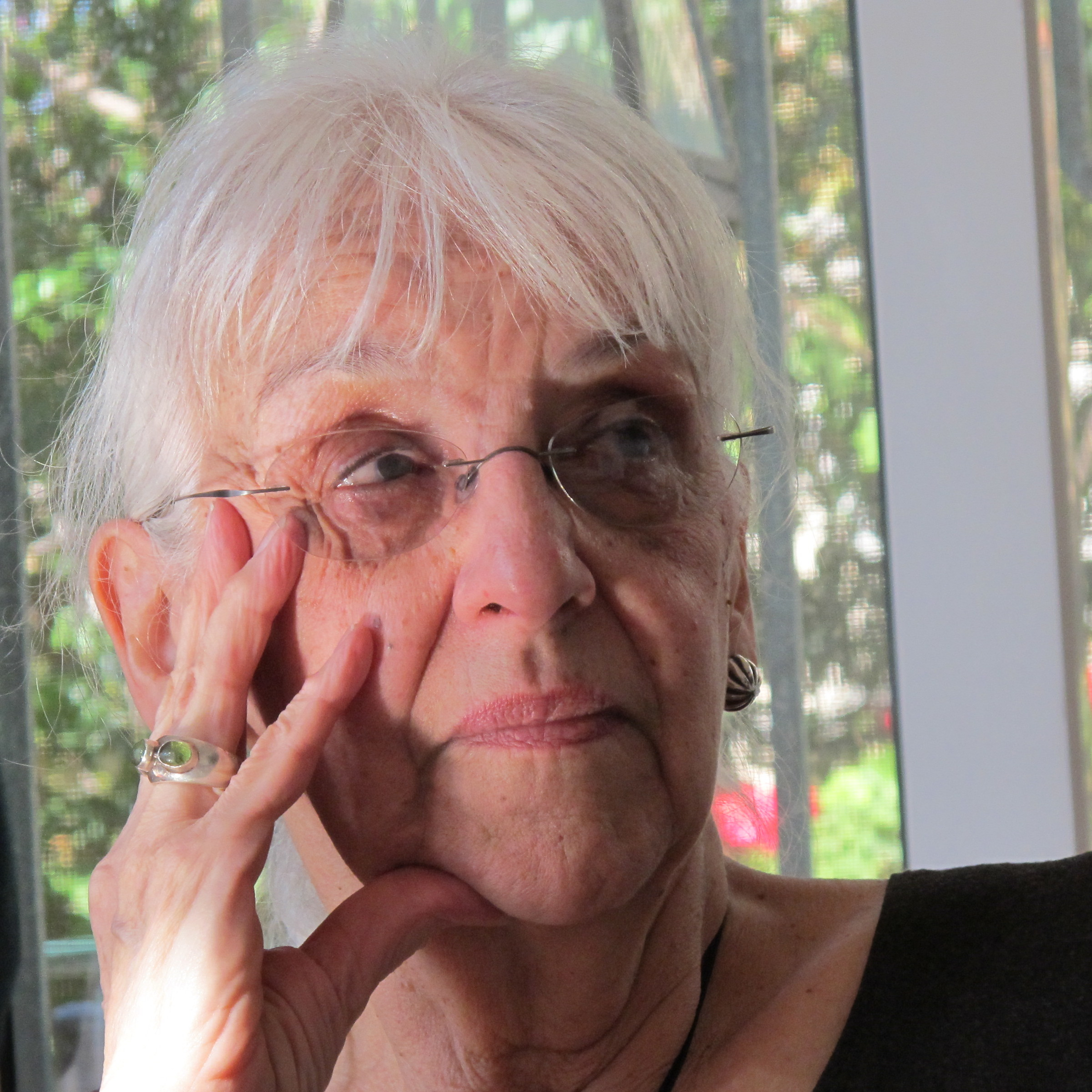
Riva Castleman, 2010 in Jerusalem, Israel

Riva Castleman (August 15, 1930 – September 4, 2014) was an American art historian, art curator, and author who is credited with promoting the mediums of printmaking and illustrated books as serious forms of fine art. From 1976–95 she was Director of the Department of Prints and Illustrated Books at the Museum of Modern Art in Manhattan.

== Life and career ==
Born Esther Riva Castleman in Chicago, Castleman was the daughter of William Castleman and Ann Castleman (née Steinberg). Her father was a printer and progressive activist who shared his love for printing and art with his daughter; passions which informed Castleman's career. After studying art and art history at the University of Iowa and the New York University Institute of Fine Arts, she joined the staff at the Museum of Modern Art (MoMa) in New York as a cataloger. She later became the director of MoMa's department of prints and illustrated books in 1976, a post she held until her retirement in 1995.

During Castleman's tenure at MoMa, she acquired many works by the world's leading printmakers, including Helen Frankenthaler, Robert Indiana, Jasper Johns, Robert Rauschenberg, Larry Rivers, Edward Ruscha, and Andy Warhol among others. The New York Times said that she "built the world’s pre-eminent collection of modern and contemporary prints". She also penned several books in relation to printmaking, including Contemporary Prints (1973), Prints of the 20th Century: A History (1976), American Impressions: Prints Since Pollock (1985), Jasper Johns: A Print Retrospective (1987), and Tatyana Grosman: A Scrapbook (2008). The patronage schemes Castleman initiated for the print department were equally innovative. She founded Print Associates in 1975, a collectors’ group charged with helping to fund acquisitions and organize programmes for MoMA’s print department. Riva instituted endowments allocated to print acquisitions for MoMA, an initiative not previously undertaken by any curatorial department at the Museum. Both of these systems of support established by Castleman for MoMA’s print department have been adopted by other major museums. She died at the age of 84 in Bridgewater, Connecticut on September 4, 2014.
