= Bill Moore (painter) =

American painter

Bill Moore is an American painter.

== Early life and career ==
Bill Moore was born in 1949 in Glendale, California. He received his early education from St. Dorothy's Grade School in Glendora. Between 1964 and 1967, he attended Damien High School. He majored in arts at St. Teresa College in Minnesota. Later, for seminary, he attended the Washington Theological Union.

His paintings were inspired by the Californian deserts, which he used to visit in childhood. Moore was also a priest and was ordained in 1975.

In October 2020, Moore died at the age of 71. He is known for The Banquet of Beauty and My Last Art Beat.
