= Klaus Rinke =

German artist (1939–2026)

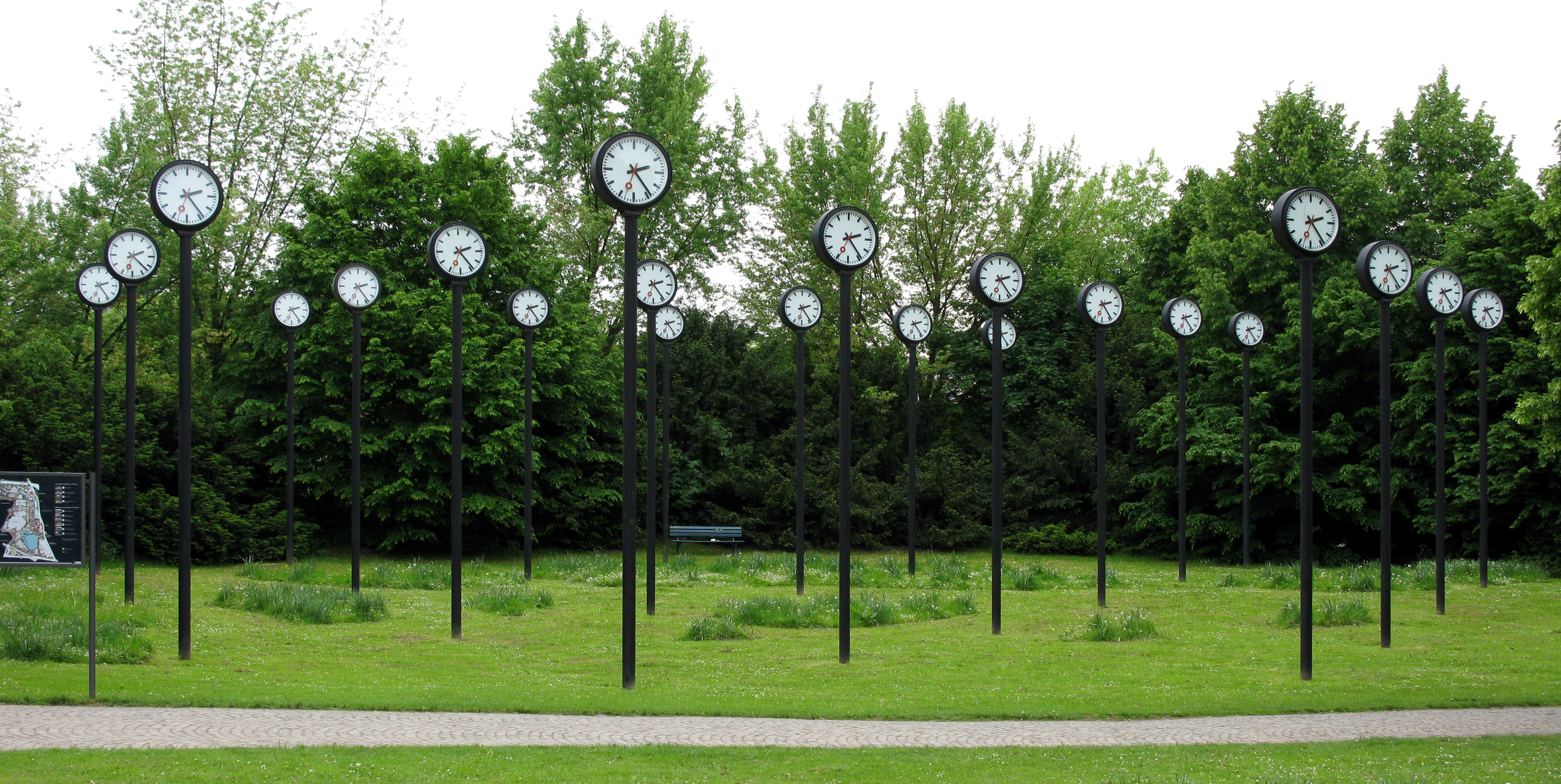
Zeitfeld (1987), an installation in the Südpark, Düsseldorf

Klaus Rinke (29 April 1939 – 20 January 2026) was a German artist.

== Life and work ==
Born in Wattenscheid, Rinke trained as a decorative artist and poster painter in Gelsenkirchen from 1954 to 1957. After studying painting from 1957 to 1960 at the Folkwang University of the Arts in Essen, he maintained various studios in Paris and Reims from 1960 to 1964. In 1962, he had his first solo exhibition at the Le Portulan Gallery in Le Havre, France.

In 1965, he returned to Düsseldorf and gave up painting to devote himself to his first water works ("12 barrels of scooped Rhine water", 1969) and first "primary demonstrations". He began an active international exhibition career. From 1970 to 1976, he organised performances and joint exhibitions with Monika Baumgartl.

From 1974 to 2004, Rinke was professor of sculpture at the Kunstakademie Düsseldorf. In 1980, he founded a 'centre for contemplation' in Haan and has had a studio and an apartment in Los Angeles since 1981. Rinke was chairman of the Malkasten artists' association from 1993 to 1998, and has been an honorary member since 1998. In 2007, Rinke moved from Haan near Düsseldorf, where he had lived and worked for almost 30 years, to Neufelden in Austria.

Rinke died after a serious illness on 20 January 2026, at the age of 86.

== Exhibitions ==
- 1969: Galerie Konrad Fischer, Düsseldorf
- 1972: Klaus Rinke. Der Versuch meine Arbeiten zu erklären, Kunsthalle Tübingen
- 1972: Biennale di Venezia, Venice
- 1972: documenta 5, Kassel
- 1973: Museum of Modern Art (MoMA)
- 1975: Museum Wiesbaden
- 1976: Museum Wiesbaden
- 1977: Biennale di Venezia, Venice
- 1977: documenta 6, Kassel
- 1985: Instrumentarium, Centre Georges-Pompidou, Paris
- 1992: Kunsthalle Düsseldorf
- 2006: Hagia Sophia Museum, Istanbul (Solo exhibition)
- 2011: Städel, Frankfurt
- 2016: The memories belong to me, Thomas Brambilla Gallery, Bergamo, Italy
- 2017: Solo Show, Art Basel Unlimited, Basel, Switzerland
- 2017: Derzeit, Skulpturenpark Waldfrieden, Wuppertal
- 2017: Instrumentarium, The Nave, CCCOD Tours, France
- 2019: Die vierte Kraft, Museum Küppersmühle für Moderne Kunst, Duisburg

== Awards ==
- 1972: Förderpreis des Landes Nordrhein-Westfalen für junge Künstlerinnen und Künstler
