= Documenta 5 =

1972 art exhibition in Kassel, West Germany

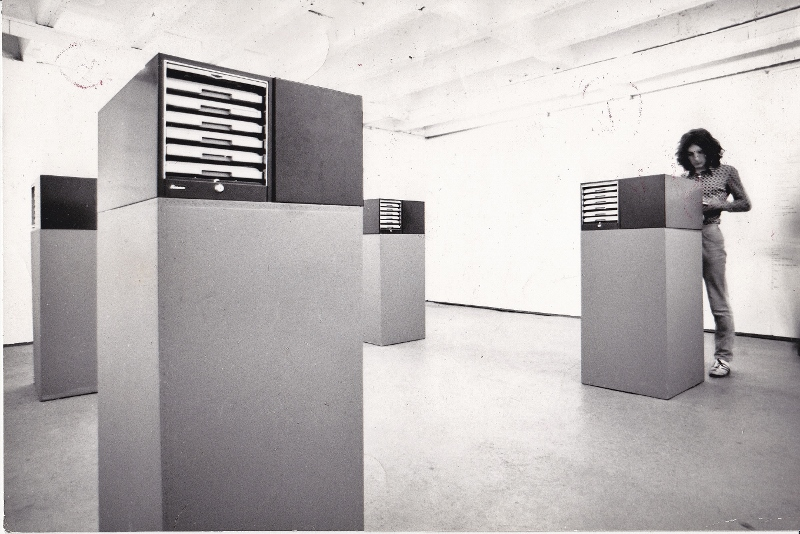
Art & Language, Index 01, documenta 5 1972

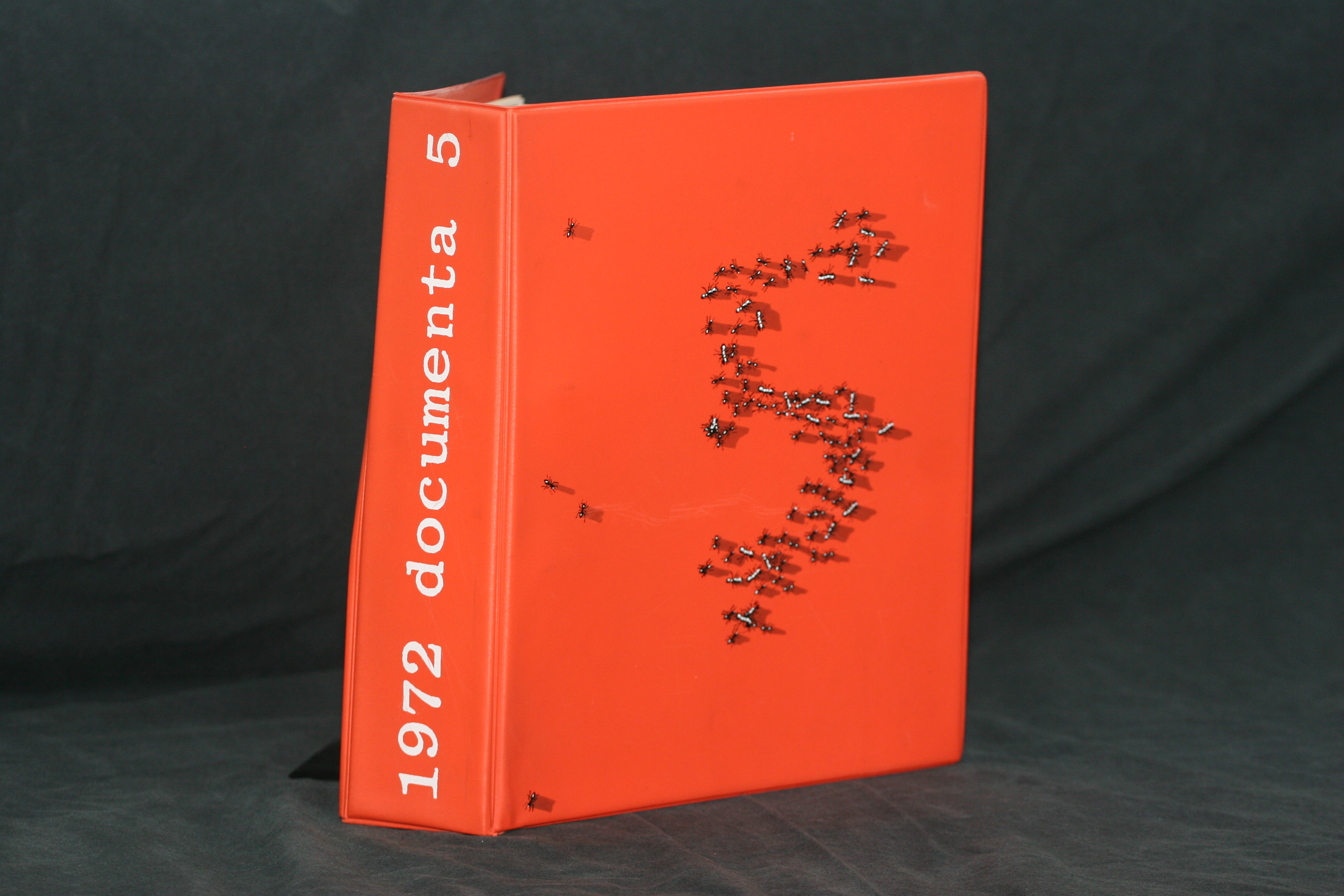
Katalog documenta 5 1972

documenta 5 was the fifth edition of documenta, a quinquennial contemporary art exhibition. It was held between 30 June and 8 October 1972 in Kassel, West Germany. The artistic director was Harald Szeemann. The title of the exhibition was: Befragung der Realität – Bildwelten heute / Questioning Reality – Pictorial worlds today.

Szeemann's curation is known for establishing a model for future art biennial events, with a central, thematic curatorial idea.

== Participants ==
A
Vito Acconci	Richard Aeschlimann	Vincenzo Agnetti	Peter Alexander	John De Andrea
Giovanni Anselmo	Anatol Herzfeld	Archigram	Siah Armajani	Charles Arnoldi
Art & Language	Richard Artschwager	Michael Asher
B
John Baldessari	Robert Barry	Georg Baselitz	Lothar Baumgarten	Monika Baumgartl
Bernd and Hilla Becher	Robert Bechtle	Gottfried Bechtold	Joseph Beuys	Natalie Bieser
Karl Oskar Blase	Mel Bochner	Alighiero Boetti	Marinus Boezem	Christian Boltanski
Stan Brakhage	Claudio Bravo	George Brecht	KP Brehmer	Marcel Broodthaers
Stanley Brouwn	Günter Brus	Daniel Buren	Victor Burgin	Michael Buthe
Eugenia Butler	James Lee Byars
C
Pier Paolo Calzolari	Luciano Castelli	Abraham David Christian	Christo and Jeanne-Claude	Chuck Close
Tony Conrad	Ron Cooper	William Copley	Joseph Cornell	Robert Cottingham
Paul Cotton
D
Hanne Darboven	Gino de Dominicis	Walter De Maria	Hermann Degkwitz	David Deutsch
Jan Dibbets	Herbert Distel	Ottomar Domnick	Dore O.	Marcel Duchamp
John Dugger	Stephen Dwoskin
E
Don Eddy	Franz Eggenschwiler	Ger van Elk	Richard Estes
F
Luciano Fabro	Hans-Peter Feldmann	John C. Fernie	Robert Filliou	Jud Fine
Joel Fisher	Barry Flanagan	Y. Fongi	Terry Fox	Hollis Frampton
Howard Fried	Hamish Fulton
G
Barry Gerson	Franz Gertsch	Vittorio Gigliotti	Gilbert & George	Ralph Goings
Hubertus Gojowczyk	Larry Gottheim	Dan Graham	Nancy Graves
H
Hans Haacke	Duane Hanson	Guy Harloff	Michael Harvey	Haus-Rucker-Co
Birgit Hein & Wilhelm Hein	Auguste Herbin	Eva Hesse	Ernst Hiestand & Ursula Hiestand	Rebecca Horn
Jean-Olivier Hucleux	Douglas Huebler
I
Jörg Immendorff	Will Insley	Rolf Iseli
J
Ken Jacobs	Neil Jenney	Alfred Jensen	Jasper Johns	Joan Jonas
K
Howard Kanovitz	Edward Kienholz & Nancy Reddin Kienholz	Imi Knoebel	Christof Kohlhöfer	Jannis Kounellis
Tom Kovachevich	Piotr Kowalski
L
David Lamelas	Owen Land	Jean Le Gac	Barry Le Va	Alfred Leslie
Sol LeWitt	Richard Long	Ingeborg Lüscher
M
Inge Mahn	Robert Mangold	Brice Marden	Agnes Martin	Donatella Mazzoleni
Étienne Martin	Richard McLean	David Medalla	Dieter Meier	Fernando Melani
Jim Melchert	Mario Merz	Gustav Metzger	Russ Meyer	Bernd Minnich
Malcolm Morley	Ed Moses
N
Bruce Nauman	Werner Nekes	Hermann Nitsch	Andrew Noren
O
Claes Oldenburg	Yoko Ono	Dennis Oppenheim
P
Robin Page	Blinky Palermo	Panamarenko	Giulio Paolini	A. R. Penck
Giuseppe Penone	Joachim Pfeufer	Elisabeth Pfund & Roger Pfund	Vettor Pisani	Sigmar Polke
Paolo Portoghesi	Stephen Posen	Rosa von Praunheim
R
Markus Raetz	Arnulf Rainer	Gerhard Richter	David Rimmer	Klaus Rinke
Dorothea Rockburne	Peter Roehr	Aldo Loris Rossi	Ulrich Rückriem	Allen Ruppersberg
Edward Ruscha	Reiner Ruthenbeck	Robert Ryman
S
John Salt	Salvo	Lucas Samaras	Günter Sarée	Paul Sarkisian
Jean-Frédéric Schnyder	Ben Schonzeit	Werner Schroeter	HA Schult	Armand Schulthess
Rudolf Schwarzkogler	Fritz Schwegler	Richard Serra	Paul Sharits	Alan Shields
Katharina Sieverding	Robert Smithson	Michael Snow	Holly Solomon & Bert Spielvogel	Irm & Ed Sommer
Keith Sonnier	Klaus Staeck	Paul Staiger	Jorge Stever	Robert Strübin
T
Paul Thek	Wayne Thiebaud	André Thomkins	David Tremlett	Richard Tuttle
U
Bernd Upnmoor
V
Ben Vautier
W
Franz Erhard Walther	Robert Watts	William Wegman	Bertram Weigel	Lawrence Weiner
Roger Welch	John Wesley	Horace Clifford Westermann	Joyce Wieland	William T. Wiley
Charles Wilp	Rolf Winnewisser	Adolf Wölfli	Tom Wudl	Klaus Wyborny
Y
La Monte Young	Peter Young
Z
Marian Zazeela	Gilberto Zorio
