= Artnet =

Art market website

Artnet AG
- Industry: Art market
- Founded: 1989; 37 years ago (as Centrox Corporation)
- Founder: Pierre Sernet
- Headquarters: New York and London
- Owner: Beowolff Capital
- Website: artnet.com

Artnet is an art market website based in New York City. Established in 1989 to provide consumers with access to databases of historical prices paid for works of art at auction, Artnet expanded in the 1990s to host its own online auctions and provide digital platforms for art galleries to publish their exhibitions online. The website has also hosted two successive digital publications focused on art world and market news, Artnet Magazine (1996–2012), and Artnet News (2014–present).

Previously owned by Artnet AG, a German company formerly listed on the Frankfurt Stock Exchange, Artnet was acquired by the American venture capital firm Beowolff Capital in 2025 and taken private before merging with the website Artsy in 2026.

== History and operations ==
=== 1989–1999: Founding and launch, magazine, dot-com era IPO ===
Pierre Sernet, a French art collector, developed a system in the late 1980s to share images of artworks and their associated prices at auction through a digital database. In 1989, he founded the Centrox Corporation in New York City to monetize his new system, providing customers software for home computers that connected them to Centrox's database of art and auction prices, which the company eventually called Artnet.

Hans Neuendorf, a German art dealer, began to invest in the company shortly after its founding in 1989, having first met Sarnet and learned about his database idea at an art fair in Paris. Neuendorf also secured additional investments from a range of art patrons whom he knew from his time as a dealer. By the mid-1990s, he owned around 85% of the company. Neuendorf closed his art gallery in 1995 and became chief executive officer of Centrox. The company changed its name to Artnet Worldwide Corporation the same year.

In 1996, the company launched Artnet Magazine, a digital publication on the Artnet website featuring art world and market reporting and criticism. Artist and critic Walter Robinson was hired as the founding editor. Artnet also established a new online system in 1996 for art galleries to display and sell work through the Artnet website.

The company struggled financially in the early to mid-1990s, with not enough customers paying for access to the art and auction database service. Financial losses throughout the decade eventually amounted to over $20 million and the primary investors mostly stopped contributing new funds. As the dot-com bubble began to build, however, market interest grew once again and a German investment firm signed on to help expand the company and plan for an IPO, bringing in additional investors in the process. Artnet AG, the new German parent company of Artnet Worldwide, was established in 1998 in preparation for an IPO.

In part to increase attention on the company in the lead-up to the IPO, Artnet launched an online auction system in March 1999, allowing buyers and sellers to transact completely digitally and bypass traditional auction houses. Artnet AG went public in May that year on the tech-focused stock exchange Neuer Markt, housed within the Frankfurt Stock Exchange, bringing in €26 million of investment. The stock opened at €46 a share, before rising briefly to €62. Several investors in the company who had purchased stock before the IPO were accused of selling their stakes when the shares had risen to their peak, before the end of the required lock-up period. Although the charges of prematurely selling shares were eventually refuted, the accusations, combined with renewed skepticism about the economic fundamentals of the company, led to significant sell-offs in the stock. By the end of the year, the stock was trading below €10 per share.

In the late 1990s, the company joined a lawsuit led by the American Civil Liberties Union to stop enforcement of the newly passed Child Online Protection Act in the United States, a federal law to restrict access on the internet for material deemed harmful to minors.

=== 2000–2009: Financial difficulties, ending and relaunching auctions ===
Artnet scaled back its online auctions in 2000 to cut costs, eliminating 17% of its work force and pivoting to auctions of exclusively prints and photographs, ending its sales of paintings and other art. It soon ended its auction services entirely, due in part to a lack of sufficient traffic to the website to sustain the sales, according to Neuendorf.

Within two years of going public, the company had spent the entirety of the funds raised from its IPO and lost a significant amount of its stock value. After debuting at €46 a share in 1999, the company was trading for 25 cents per share in 2003. Artnet was one of several art market and news websites that expanded rapidly in the 1990s before a sharp contraction in the early 2000s, in tandem with the trajectory of the broader dot-com bubble over the same period.

The company created a new financial index in 2006 to track the average prices at auction of works by the most commonly traded artists. Artnet relaunched its online auction service in 2008, with Neuendorf saying the website had gained enough viewers for the auctions to be financially sustainable.

=== 2010–2019: Neuendorf steps down, end of Artnet Magazine, launch of Artnet News ===
Neuendorf stepped down as chief executive in June 2012 and was succeeded by his son Jacob Pabst. The company simultaneously shut down Artnet Magazine, saying that the publication had struggled financially for too long. Also in 2012, Rüdiger Weng, a minority shareholder and owner of a German wholesale art business attempted to acquire a majority stake in the company with Russian financier Sergey Skaterschikov and Luxembourg company Redline Capital Management, but failed in his bid. Weng, who had owned stock in the company since the IPO, disagreed with Artnet's focus on unprofitable media ventures and lack of dividends for shareholders.

In late 2013, the year after closing Artnet Magazine, the company announced that it had hired critic and journalist Benjamin Genocchio as founding editor-in-chief of Artnet News, a new journalism-oriented digital publication on the Artnet website. Artnet News began publishing in February 2014.

Weng again began trying to purchase an ownership stake in Artnet in 2016 with venture capitalist Andreas Tielebier-Langenscheidt, later acquiring additional shares from investor Robert de Rothschild resulting in Weng's stake rising above 25%. Neuendorf and Artnet leadership accused Weng and Tielebier-Langenscheidt of speaking negatively about the company in the media despite being invested in the business.

Artnet acquired the art market analytics firm Tutela Capital in 2016 to expand its data analysis capacity. The following year, the company purchased the assets of the art sales platform Artlist.

=== 2020–present: Company taken private, merger with Artsy ===
Weng used his minority stake in Artnet AG to block a recapitalization of the company in 2020 that would have allowed for additional investments, alleging that Pabst's high compensation package and a large consulting contract awarded to Neuendorf's separate firm were draining the company's finances. The dispute between Weng and the Neuendorf family continued throughout the early 2020s, with several shareholder meetings canceled or postponed as the two parties attempted to take or keep control of the company; Weng again blocked a new recapitalization of Artnet in 2023.

In early 2025, Neuendorf announced his retirement from Artnet's board. Shortly after, following the accidental public release of an internal audit document alleging financial and legal mismanagement at Artnet, Weng again attempted to take control of the company's supervisory board, having become the largest single shareholder at 29%. The Neuendorf family allied with American venture capitalist Andrew E. Wolff, a minority shareholder, to constitute a new supervisory board without any of Weng's chosen members. Weng subsequently sold his stake in the company.

Wolff and his firm Beowolff Capital acquired a majority stake in Artnet in May 2025, buying out remaining shareholders to take the company private and delist it from the Frankfurt Stock Exchange. The month before taking ownership of Artnet, Beowolff Capital purchased a controlling stake in the separate art market website Artsy. Pabst resigned as CEO in September 2025 immediately before the company's annual general meeting, saying he and Wolff disagreed on Pabst's leadership.

In April 2026, Beowolff Capital combined Artnet and Artsy, elevating Jeffrey Yin, Artsy's CEO, as the new leader of the combined companies. The merger involved layoffs across Artnet's editorial division including Artnet News, as well as the formal closure of the company's Berlin office and German business entity.

== Digital publications ==
=== Artnet Magazine (1996–2012) ===
Artnet launched its first publication, Artnet Magazine, in 1996, naming Walter Robinson as the magazine's founding editor. Artnet Magazine was the first digital publication exclusively dedicated to art and featured art world and market reporting as well as art criticism and commentary. The publication also eventually launched French– and German–language versions of the magazine.

Notable contributors included Michèle C. Cone, Arthur Danto, Charlie Finch, Robert Rosenblum, Peter Schjeldahl, Barbara Pollack, Peter Halley, and Thomas Hoving. Painter and writer Steve Mumford embedded with American military units in the Iraq War beginning in April 2003 as a correspondent for the magazine, publishing commentary and illustrations about his experiences during the conflict.

Artnet shuttered the publication in June 2012 after sixteen years because of long-term financial losses. The company also closed the French– and German–language editions.

=== Artnet News (2014–present) ===
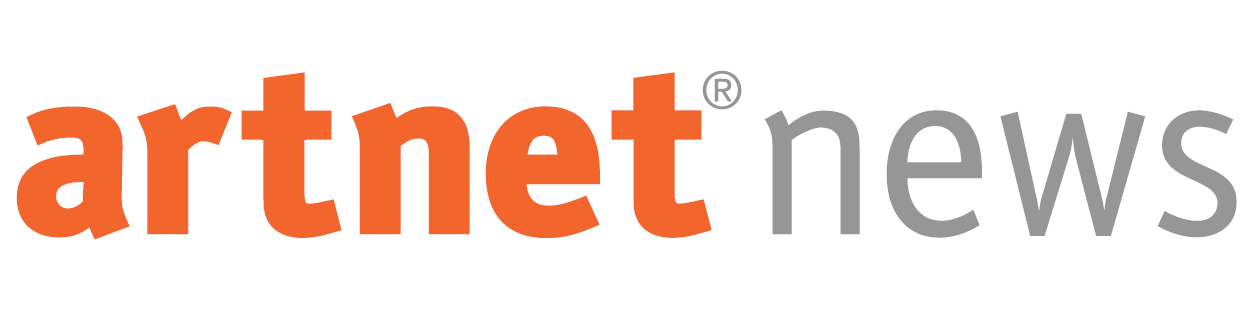
Artnet News logo

Shortly after Artnet Magazine was closed, the company hired Benjamin Genocchio to launch Artnet News, a new digital publication. The CEO at the time said that the new publication would not include reviews or criticism, focusing exclusively on news and original reporting. Artnet News first published in February 2014.

Genocchio left the publication in December 2015 to become the head of The Armory Show, a New York art fair. After Genocchio left Artnet News, several of his colleagues and employees accused him of sexual harassment and misconduct during his tenure at the publication, including nonconsensual groping and verbal abuse, which he denied.

Rozalia Jovanovic, formerly a deputy editor of Artnet News, became editor-in-chief of the publication after Genocchio departed. Jovanovic left Artnet News in 2017 and was succeeded as editor by Andrew Goldstein, who had previously worked as editor-in-chief of the art market website Artspace's editorial content. Goldstein left Artnet News in September 2023. Andrew Russeth was named interim editor of Artnet News after the company merged with Artsy in April 2026.

== Products and services ==
=== Price databases ===
Artnet's original core services are its databases of art prices, primarily from public auctions, giving subscribers access to historical sales results. The New York Times described Artnet's database system as the "Bloomberg terminal of the auction business".

At its start and throughout the 1990s, the company provided subscribers with a software for their home computers that would allow them to access Artnet's databases through a modem internet connection. Although the software was free, Artnet charged customers between $1.25 and $1.75 a minute to access the price databases.

In 1996, the company said its databases had prices for 1.4 million artworks. That figure rose to over 2 million in 1999, 3.5 million in 2007, and 10 million in 2016.

=== Online auctions ===
Artnet first launched a system for online auctions in 1999, immediately prior to launching an IPO in Germany. The company claimed that it sold over $1 million worth of art within six months of launching the auctions. Although the auctions helped raise investment interest in the company, they failed to attract significant enough numbers of buyers and sellers of art to be sustainable. The company scaled back its auctions in late 2000 before ending them completely soon after. The auctions lost a total of $11 million for the company.

The company relaunched its online auctions in 2008. In 2011, a work by Andy Warhol became the first piece to sell for over $1 million in an online Artnet auction, though the average price of works sold in their auctions at the time, $6,800, was much lower. Online auctions made up around 14% of the company's income by 2011. They constituted the majority of the company's revenue by the 2020s.

=== Gallery network ===
In 1996 the company created an online system for art galleries to display and sell work digitally, which eventually developed into the company's gallery network. Within several weeks of launching, around 150 galleries joined the platform, mainly in New York and Germany. It originally cost galleries close to $1000 to list a full exhibition on the platform. At its launch, very few galleries were willing to publicly add prices to artworks displayed on Artnet. More than 1700 galleries had joined the service to create online showrooms by 2007.

=== Auction and art fair collaborations ===
Artnet has also developed online art viewing and purchasing platforms in collaboration with art fairs. In 2007, the company launched a collaboration with the Swiss art fair Art Basel and its subsidiary Art Basel Miami Beach to document and display art from the fairs online.
