= Galerie Vallois =

French art gallery

Coordinates: 48.8552°N 2.3367°E

Galerie Georges-Philippe et Nathalie Vallois
- Established: 1983
- Location: 36, rue de Seine, Paris, France
- Type: Art Gallery
- Collections: Nouveau réalisme Contemporary art
- Website: www.galerie-vallois.com/en/

The Galerie Georges-Philippe et Nathalie Vallois is a contemporary art gallery owned by Georges-Philippe and Nathalie Vallois and is located in Paris, France. The gallery has two spaces Rue de Seine in Paris, France, at the 36th and the 33rd.

In addition to recent contemporary art, the gallery also specializes in works by Nouveaux réalistes such as Arman, César or Jacques Villeglé.

Since 2022, Georges-Philippe Vallois has been serving on the selection committee of Art Basel's Paris edition.

== Artists represented by the gallery ==
- Pilar Albarracín
- Arman
- Julien Berthier
- Julien Bismuth
- Alain Bublex
- Robert Cottingham
- John DeAndrea
- Massimo Furlan
- Eulàlia Grau
- Taro Izumi
- Richard Jackson
- Adam Janes
- Jean-Yves Jouannais
- Martin Kersels
- Paul Kos
- Zhenya Machneva
- Jeff Mills
- Henrique Oliveira
- Peybak
- Lucie Picandet
- Emanuel Proweller
- Duke Riley
- Lázaro Saavedra
- Niki de Saint Phalle
- Peter Stampfli
- Jean Tinguely
- Keith Tyson
- Tomi Ungerer
- Jacques Villeglé
- William Wegman
- Winshluss
- Virginie Yassef

== Publications ==
The gallery offers a large selection of publications to accompagny some exhibitions. Here is a selection :

- Catherine Francblin, Samuel Gross, Pavel Schmidt, Daniel Spoerri. Les choses de la vie, Le Métayer Vallois Editions / Les presses du réel, 2026.
- Julián Zugazagoitia, Bernard Blistène, Arman. Tout ce qui reste, Galerie GP & N Vallois / Les Presses du réel, 2025.
- Agate Bortolussi, Eulàlia Grau. Etnografias-Collages, Le Métayer Vallois / Les presses du réel, 2024
- Jeanne Benameur, Elisabeth Brami-Prowelleur, Emanuel Proweller, Eric Verhagen, Emanuel Proweller. Un souvenir de soleil, Galerie GP & N Vallois / Editions courtes et longues, 2024.
- John DeAndrea, Elaine Eldridge, Catherine Millet, John DeAndrea. Grace, Galerie GP & N Vallois / Les presses du réel, 2023.
- Sasha Kalter-Wasserman, Niki de Saint Phalle, Annabelle Ténèze, Niki de Saint Phalle. Tableaux éclatés, Galerie GP & N Vallois / Salon 94 / Les presses du réel, 2021.
- Rita Cusimano, Samuel Gross, Marco Livingston, Catherine Millet, Nouveau Réalisme = Nouvelles approches perspectives du réel, Galerie GP & N Vallois, 2021.
- Harry Bellet, Ariel Wizman, Jacques Villeglé. Jeune, Gay et Impudique, Galerie GP & N Vallois, 2019.
- Camille Morineau, Jean Tinguely '60s, Galerie GP & N Vallois, 2016.

== Exhibitions selection since 2013 ==
=== 2026 ===
- Daniel Spoerri, « Les choses de la vie », 36 rue de Seine, Paris, France
- Pilar Albarracín, Evelyne Axell, Pamela Berkovic, Louise Bourgoin, John Kayser, Christian Louboutin, Pierre Molinier, Helmut Newton, Emanuel Proweller, Peter Stämplfi, Tomi Ungerer, Ellen von Unwerth, William Wegman, Winshluss, « Tout en jambes » (curator : Jonathan Lambert), 33 rue de Seine, Paris, France
- Pilar Albarracín, William Amor, Arman, Julien Berthier, François Dufrêne, Perrine Guyonnet, Raymond Hains, George Herms, Martin Kersels, Louise Nevelson, Henrique Oliveira, Duke Riley, Niki De Saint Phalle, Moffat Takadiwa, Jean Tinguely, Jacques Villeglé, « Tendres Débris », 33 & 36 rue de Seine, Paris, France
- Shirley Cao, Robert Cottingham, Eulàlia Grau, Charlotte Hailstone, Richard Jackson, Martin Kersels, Gabrielle Mar, Dana Nechmad, « Through the prism », 1018 Madison Av., New York, United States

=== 2025 ===
- Emanuel Proweller, « Focus #3 - Emanuel Proweller, avec éclat ! », 33 rue de Seine, Paris, France
- Duke Riley, « Baigné de vos langueurs », 36 rue de Seine, Paris, France
- Arman, « Tout ce qui reste » (curator : Bernard Blistène), 33 & 36 rue de Seine, Paris, France
- Arman, Julien Bismuth, Alain Bublex, Robert Cottingham, Richard Estes, Ralph Goings, Martin Kersels, Duke Riley, William Wegman, « A Journey in America », 1018 Madison Av., New York, United States
- John Baeder, Robert Bechtle, Charles Bell, Robert Cottingham, John DeAndrea, Ralph Goings, Duane Hanson, John Salt, « Focus #2 - Hyperréalisme Américain », 33 rue de Seine, Paris, France
- Robert Cottingham, « Cameras, Typewriters & Components », 36 rue de Seine, Paris, France
- Julia Wachtel, Wendy White, Jason Yates, « Windchimes and Prayers », 1018 Madison Av., New York, United States
- Pilar Albarracín, Evelyn Axell, Julien Bismuth, Alain Bublex, Robert Cottingham, John DeAndrea, Erik Dietman, Claude Gilli, Eulàlia Grau, Raymond Hains, Richard Jackson, Alain Jacquet, Martin Kersels, Paul Kos, Zhenya Machneva, Louise Nevelson, Henrique Oliveira, Peybak, Emanuel Proweller, Niki de Saint Phalle, Pierre Seinturier, Peter Stämpfli, Keith Tyson, Tomi Ungerer, Winshluss, William Wegman and Virginie Yassef, « Conversation pieces », 36 rue de Seine, Paris, France
- César, « Focus #1 - César », 33 rue de Seine, Paris, France
- Marion Mailaender, « Mi casa es tu casa », 33 rue de Seine, Paris, France
- Julien Berthier, « Passion potelet », 36 rue de Seine, Paris, France
- Pilar Albarracín, Leonora Carrington, Eulàlia Grau, Zhenya Machneva, Lucie Picandet, Niki de Saint Phalle, Julia Wachtel, Virginie Yassef, « Elles », 1018 Madison Av., New York, United States
- Hans Bellmer, Robert Cottingham, Jorge Camacho, Jim Dine, Jean Dubuffet, Marcel Duchamp, Eulàlia Grau, Richard Jackson, Martin Kersels, Pierre Molinier, Claes Oldenburg, Wolfgang Paalen, Francis Picabia, Man Ray, Tomi Ungerer, Jacques Villeglé, « Face à Face », 1018 Madison Av., New York, United States
- Jean-Michel Basquiat, Julien Berthier, Blutch, Alain Bublex, Robert Cottingham, Gilles Elie, Douglas Gordon, Charles Hascoët, Gregor Hildebrandt, Jim Jarmusch, Mike Kelley, Martin Kersels, Elodie Lesourd, Christian Marclay, Jeff Mills, Duke Riley, Erin M. Riley, Pierre Seinturier, Reeve Schumacher, Tomi Ungerer, Jacques Villeglé, Julia Wachtel, Winschluss, « Musicology », 33 & 36 rue de Seine, Paris, France

=== 2024 ===
- Richard Jackson, « Wretched Excess », 36 rue de Seine, Paris, France
- Pierre Seinturier, « Cher Monsieur Peinturier », 33 rue de Seine, Paris, France
- Emanuel Proweller, « Proweller, un souvenir de soleil », 36 rue de Seine, Paris, France
- Lucie Picandet, « Charnières », 33 rue de Seine, Paris, France
- Alain Bublex, « Landscaping », 36 rue de Seine, Paris, France
- Jacques Villeglé, « STAR », 33 & 36 rue de Seine, Paris, France

=== 2023 ===
- Velerio Adami, Evelyne Axell, Matthew Brannon, Alain Bublex, Robert Cottingham, Antoine de Margerie, Gilles Elie, Bertrand Lavier, Emanuel Proweller, Peter Stämpfli, Emilio Tadini, Hervé Télémaque, William Wegman, « Aplatitudes! », 33 et 36 rue de Seine, Paris, France
- Tomi Ungerer, « Tomi l'Alchimiste - Le Grand Oeuvre », 33 & 36 rue de Seine, Paris, France
- John DeAndrea, « Grâce », 36 rue de Seine, Paris, France
- Ben Sakoguchi, « oranges ● pancartes ● cartes postales », 33 rue de Seine, Paris, France
- Niki de Saint Phalle, « Masterworks 1961-1970 », 1018 Madison Av., New York, United States

=== 2022 ===
- Peybak, « Strange Aeons - We will meet you there », 36 rue de Seine, Paris, France
- Julien Bismuth, « Harlequinades », 33 rue de Seine, Paris, France
- Virginie Yassef, « Dogs Dream », 36 rue de Seine, Paris, France
- Enrico Baj, Martin Kersels, « Home Sweet Home », 36 rue de Seine, Paris, France
- Eulàlia Grau, « Etnografias », 33 rue de Seine, Paris, France

=== 2021 ===
- Jacques Villeglé, « Alphabets », 36 rue de Seine, Paris, France
- Arman, César, Christo, Gérard Deschamps, François Dufrêne, Raymond Hains, Yves Klein, Martial Raysse, Mimmo Rotella, Niki de Saint Phalle, Daniel Spoerri, Jean Tinguely, Jacques Villeglé, « Nouveau Réalisme = Nouvelle approches perspectives du réel », 33 & 36 rue de Seine, Paris, France
- Emanuel Proweller, « Le Vif du sujet », 36 rue de Seine, Paris, France

=== 2020 ===
- Gilles Barbier, Bianca Bondi, Alice Guittard, Matthieu Haberard, Charlotte Heninger, Edward Kienholz, Benjamin Loyauté, Gaspard Maîtrepierre, Lucie Picandet, Niki de Saint Phalle, Daniel Spoerri, « Le Vaisseau d'or », (curator: Gaël Charbau), 36 rue de Seine, Paris, France

=== 2019 ===
- Pilar Albarracín, Bianca Argímon, Lauren Coullard, Aurélie Gravas, Vivian Greven, Lucie Picandet, Niki de Saint Phalle, « Ladies Only », 33 rue de Seine, Paris, France
- Jacques Villeglé, « Jeune, Gay et Impudique », 36 rue de Seine, Paris, France
- Jean Tinguely, « Bricolages et Débri(s)collages », 36 rue de Seine, Paris, France

=== 2018 ===
- Paul Kos, « Kinetic Landscape(s) », 36 rue de Seine, Paris, France
- Pilar Albarracín, Pat Andrea, Hans Bellmer, VALIE EXPORT, Claude Gilli, Michel Journiac, Annette Messager, Jeff Mills, Jules Pascin, Françoise Pétrovich, Francis Picabia, Maria Isabel Rueda, Niki de Saint Phalle, Cindy Sherman, Jacques Villeglé & Julia Wachtel, « La Maman et la Putain », 36 rue de Seine, Paris, France
- Alain Bublex, « An American Landscape », 36 rue de Seine, Paris, France

=== 2017 ===
- Peter Stämpfli, « Ligne continue », 33 rue de Seine, Paris, France
- Taro Izumi, « Night lie », 36 rue de Seine, Paris, France
- Keith Tyson, « Les Fleurs », 36 rue de Seine, Paris, France
- Niki de Saint Phalle, « Belles ! Belles ! Belles !, Les femmes de Niki de Saint Phalle », 33 & 36 rue de Seine, Paris, France

=== 2016 ===
- Jean Tinguely, « Jean Tinguely, '60s », 33 & 36 rue de Seine, Paris, France
- Lázaro Saavedra, « Pensamiento Visual », 33 rue de Seine, Paris, France
- Jacques Villeglé, « Pénélope à Quimper ou Le Retour d’Ulysse », 33 & 36 rue de Seine, Paris, France

=== 2015 ===
- Adam Janes & Pierre Seinturier, « Memory Song » / « It's a way of life! », 36 rue de Seine, Paris, France
- Henrique Oliveira, « Fissure », 36 rue de Seine, Paris, France
- Alain Jacquet, « Des Images d'Epinal aux Camouflages (1961 - 1963) », 36 rue de Seine, Paris, France
- Winshluss, « Pas la peine de pleurer, personne ne te regarde... », 36 rue de Seine, Paris, France
- Peybak, « Abrakan (naissance) », Project Room, 36 rue de Seine, Paris, France
- Arman, Julien Berthier, Alain Bublex, César, José Davila, Jimmie Durham, Peter Fischli & David Weiss, Richard Jackson, Alain Jacquet, André Komatsu, Paul Kos, Arnold Odermatt, Pierre Seinturier, Jean Tinguely, « Carambolages », 36 rue de Seine, Paris, France
- Pilar Albarracín, « La Calle del Infierno », 36 rue de Seine, Paris, France
- Julien Berthier, « Public Sculptures », 36 rue de Seine, Paris, France

=== 2014 ===
- Alain Bublex, « Arrière-plan », 36 rue de Seine, Paris, France
- Richard Jackson, « Darker Room », 36 rue de Seine, Paris, France
- Jacques Villeglé, « Graffitis Politiques 1962-1991 », 36 rue de Seine, Paris, France

=== 2013 ===
- Niki de Saint Phalle, « En joue ! Assemblages & Tirs (1958-1964) », 36 rue de Seine, Paris, France
- Pilar Albarracin, Gilles Barbier, Fredi Casco, Marina de Caro, Matias Duville, Ana Gallardo, Juan Fernandez Herran, Martin Kersels, Henrique Oliveira, Paulina Silva Hayon, Walter Andrade, Virginie Yassef, « La Distance Juste » (curator : Albertine de Galbert), 36 rue de Seine, Paris, France
- Julien Bismuth, « Perroquet », 36 rue de Seine, Paris, France
- Mike Cooter, « Set theory », Project Room, 36 rue de Seine, Paris, France
- Taro Izumi, « The Source of Wrinkles », 36 rue de Seine, Paris, France
