= Jamian Juliano-Villani =

American painter (born 1987)

- Born: 1987 (age 38–39); Tewksbury, New Jersey, U.S.
- Education: Rutgers University
- Known for: Painting

Jamian Juliano-Villani (born 1987) is an American painter. Juliano-Villani painting's pull from a wide range of references including fashion, photography, illustration, and art history to create hyper-saturated scenes and portraits. Juliano-Villani lives and works in New York, NY.

== Early life and education ==
Juliano-Villani grew up in Tewksbury, New Jersey. As a daughter of commercial painters, Juliano-Villani spent much of her childhood in her parents silk-screening factory familiarizing herself with 1970s and 1980s graphic design.

Juliano-Villani graduated from Rutgers University in 2013.

== Work ==
=== Painting ===
Juliano-Villani's first solo exhibition, Me, Myself and Jah, opened at Rawson Projects in 2013. In an interview with Jonathan Griffin, featured on ARTnews, Juliano-Villani says of her work,

"My paintings are meant to function like TV, in a way. The viewer is supposed to become passive. Instead of alluding or whispering, like a lot of art does, this is art that tells you what's up. It kind of does the work for you, like TV does."

The following year, Juliano-Villani was included in the group show, Puddle, Pothole, Portal, curated by Camille Henrot and Ruba Katrib at SculptureCenter in Queens.

In 2015, Juliano-Villani had her first solo museum show at Museum of Contemporary Art Detroit. Later that year, the artist presented new works at JTT gallery, titled Crypod. Writer and art critic Sarah Nicole Prickett writes for Artforum, "The best painting is the one that looks you square in the eyes, but its own eyes are scratched right out: Penny's Change is a smear-up of a puffer-jacketed graffiti artist's selfie and Peter Saul's Mona Lisa Throws Up Pizza, 1995, with the kind of teeth—big but mostly missing—that appear to you in nightmares about money." The artist has lectured at the Cranbrook Academy of Art and at the Swiss Institute alongside Brian Belott.

In early 2018, Ten Pound Hand, Juliano-Villani's second show at JTT gallery, opened with positive reviews. Critic Zoë Lescaze writes that, "In Gone with the Wind (all works 2018), a cartoon fish gluts itself on Coca-Cola while a helpless-looking firefighter floats above burning California. October depicts an ash-choked Pompeian infant blowing across an empty school hallway. The linoleum floor is littered with shattered glass, in an eerie evocation of recent school shootings. Together, these works convey a loss of control, of entropy overriding security, idealism, and best-case scenarios."

Juliano-Villani was included in the 2022 Venice Art Biennale, The Milk of Dreams, curated by Cecilia Alemani. The artist and writer, Neil Harvey, described the work as "brash, beautifully crafted collisions between cartoonland and banal interiors." Madeline Weisburg and Ian Wallace explain that the "expansive, bright, chaotic, and bawdy" paintings by Juliano-Villani utilize her process of borrowing from "movies, memes, stock photography, art history, and collected printed matter" to "beckon you in."

Juliano-Villani sources, and was included in a wide range of artists, animators, and illustrators in her work such as Chuck Jones, Marcell Jankovics, Ralph Bakshi, Bernard Szajner, R. Crumb, and more. She approaches each painting with a "hyper-specific" concept in mind spending, workshopping various concepts together from archival and internet research. Juliano-Villani has described her process as a "poor man's Photoshop."

Juliano-Villani names Mike Kelley, John Wesley, Giorgio Morandi, Wendy White, and Gertrude Abercrombie as some of her favorite artists.

=== O'Flaherty's gallery ===
In 2021, Villani opened a project-space-gallery with painter and video artist Billy Grant and musician Ruby Zarsky of Sateen.

== Exhibitions ==
=== Solo exhibitions ===
- Sincerely, Tony, Massimo De Carlo, Milan, IT, 2017
- The World's Greatest Planet on Earth, Studio Voltaire, London, UK, 2016
- Detroit Affinities: Jamian Juliano-Villani, Museum of Contemporary Art Detroit, Detroit MI. Curated by Jens Hoffman, 2015
