= Wendy White =

Wendy White may refer to:

- Wendy White (artist) (born 1971), American artist
- Wendy White (mezzo-soprano) (born 1953), American opera singer
- Wendy White (netball) (born 1940), Welsh netball player, coach, administrator
- Wendy White (tennis) (born 1960), American tennis player
- Wendy Tan White (born 1970), British businesswoman
