= Ruytchi Souzouki =

Japanese artist

- 鈴木龍一
- Born: August 2, 1904; Yokohama, Japan
- Died: 1985 (aged 80–81); Paris, France
- Burial place: Cimetière parisien de Thiais
- Other name: Ryuichi Suzuki
- Occupations: painter, decorator, illustrator, lithographer, engraver and art critic

Ruytchi Souzouki (August 2, 1904, Yokohama – 1985, Paris), also written Ryuichi Suzuki (Japanese: 鈴木龍一), was a Japanese painter, decorator, illustrator, lithographer, engraver and art critic.

== Biography ==
Ruytchi Souzouki was introduced to painting by Sanzo Wada (1883–1967), a well-known artist in Japan. His banker father moved to Brazil in the 1920s and the young Ruytchi continued his artistic training at the School of Fine Arts in Rio de Janeiro. The poet Paul Fort, visiting Brazil, became interested in the creative intensity of the young man and convinced him to settle in Paris in the early 1920s.

Souzouki met the world of Japanese artists living in Paris in the Montparnasse of the Roaring Twenties. He became close to Tsuguharu Foujita, who made a portrait of Souzouki and introduced him to the patron Jirohachi Satsuma (1901–1976). In 1922, Souzouki presented his first solo exhibition at the Galerie Manuel Frères in Paris, with a catalog prefaced by the art critic André Salmon. Starting from 1923, he exhibited regularly at the Salons d'Automne, the Salon des indépendants and the Tuileries. In particular at the Salon des indépendants, he presented Dames à la Terrasse in 1928 and, Piano et Chant. in 1930.

In 1936, Foujita had one of Souzouki's paintings acquired by the National Gallery in Prague. His pictorial approach became increasingly influenced by the various currents of the figurative avant-garde. He became associated with the painters of the School of Paris and connected with Jules Pascin and Max Ernst. His research on the expression of the psyche led him to adhere to the surrealist approach, which became pivotal for all his work, leading him to become interested in automatic drawing and collage.

He received the prize of the Japanese Embassy in Paris in 1939. After the Second World War, he further made himself known with works at the Salon d'Automne, the Salon des Tuileries and the Salon des Indépendants. His fame thrived and in 1954, he exhibited surrealist collages at the Galerie Paul Petrides and the Galerie Romanet. Respectively in 1969 and 1971, he presented L'invitation par la Déesse Shakti and Poids de la modestie at the Salon des Indépendants. He published articles in the magazine Bizarre. The originality of his artistic expression laid in the integration of popular elements (press, soap operas, crime novel), from which he made portrait collages of Martine Carol, Brigitte Bardot and Marcel Proust, with an Arcimboldo influence. The editor Eric Losfeld, published a collection of his drawings devoted to Brigitte Bardot (1960, prefaced by Jacques Sternberg).

Gradually, he became estranged to the world and continued his research alone in his workshop, rue Mouton-Duvernet. He played a Japanese tourist in The Holes a film by Pierre Tchernia in 1973 and received the City of Paris Silver Medal in 1980.

He died poor and forgotten, in 1985 and is buried in the mass grave of the Cimetière parisien de Thiais. His work, recovered by his janitor, was auctioned at the Hôtel Drouot Auction House in March 1986, the unsold being dumped.

He was gradually rediscovered in the 2000s. The Galerie Vallois (Paris, New York) devoted an exhibition, organized by Henri Enu. Some of his works are sold in public markets. The painter Albert Mescam became aware of his drawings which he published a book about at the Éditions de L’Usine Souzouki, les dessins de 1935. The gallerist François Deneulin revisited his work with an exhibition in 2016 and a website. Ruychi Souzouki is sometimes mistaken with Ryozo Souzouki (1898–1958), a contemporary Japanese painter who also lived in France. Some of Ruychi Souzouki's paintings have been attributed to Ryozo.

== Bibliography ==
- Dimitri Salmon, Souzouki, les dessins de 1935, les Éditions de l'Usine, 2015
- Kikuko Ogawa, Yoshihide Egawa, Salon Des Artistes Japonais and Baron Satsuma: Japanese Artists in Europe Before World War 2, Tokushima Modern Art Museum, Nara Sogo Museum of Art, Kyodo News, 1998
