= Brett Gallaway =

American trial lawyer and partner at McLaughlin & Stern

Brett R. Gallaway is an American trial lawyer and partner at McLaughlin & Stern in New York City. He has worked on employment, commercial, housing and sports-related litigation.

== Career ==
Gallaway earned a BS from New York University and a JD from Tulane University Law School.

Gallaway previously worked at Klafter Olsen & Lesser LLP and LaSasso Griesmeyer Law Group. He joined McLaughlin & Stern in January 2013 and became a partner in September 2014.

Gallaway represented employees in Frlekin v. Apple Inc., a case concerning compensation for mandatory security searches at Apple stores. In 2020, courts ruled in favor of the employees on the issue of compensable working time.

Gallaway also acted on behalf of workers in Ferreras v. American Airlines, Inc., a wage case in which the Third Circuit vacated class certification in 2019. There was also Wilson v. Jamaica Service Program for Older Adults, an overtime case involving the use of representative testimony. Other cases involved RiverBay Corporation, which operates Co-op City, and the Monarch Condominium in Manhattan. In 2022, a $912,500 settlement involving 35 Monarch employees was approved by a federal court.

In 2022, Gallaway represented the plaintiff in a wage lawsuit against Endicott Coil Company. He was also counsel in Onate v. AHRC Health Care, Inc., filed in 2020. His law firm stated in December 2025 that a court had approved a $5.15 million settlement in connection with about 8,800 current and former workers.

In 2020, Gallaway represented James Oliver, the former director and minority owner of the Mary Boone Gallery, who sued the art dealer Mary Boone over alleged unpaid compensation and misuse of art sale proceeds. In 2021, an appellate court allowed several of his claims to proceed.

In 2023, Gallaway represented the tenants who were displaced because of a fire in a building in Sunnyside, Queens, that occurred in December 2023. About 200 people were displaced. In June 2024, the tenants sued their landlord for alleged negligence and losses suffered because of it. The case continued in 2025 and 2026. People demanded repairs and compensation.

In 2016, Gallaway represented the football players and coaches involved in the wage lawsuit against the Fall Experimental Football League.

In 2024, Gallaway represented NFL kicker Brandon McManus in a sexual assault case. He rejected the allegations on behalf of his client. Afterward, the plaintiffs filed an amended complaint, while the NFL conducted its own investigation but did not take disciplinary action. Gallaway also represented Deven Thompkins, the former Tampa Bay Buccaneers player, who sued his estranged wife and her mother for defamation following domestic abuse allegations.
