= Jeff Schneider (artist) =

American artist

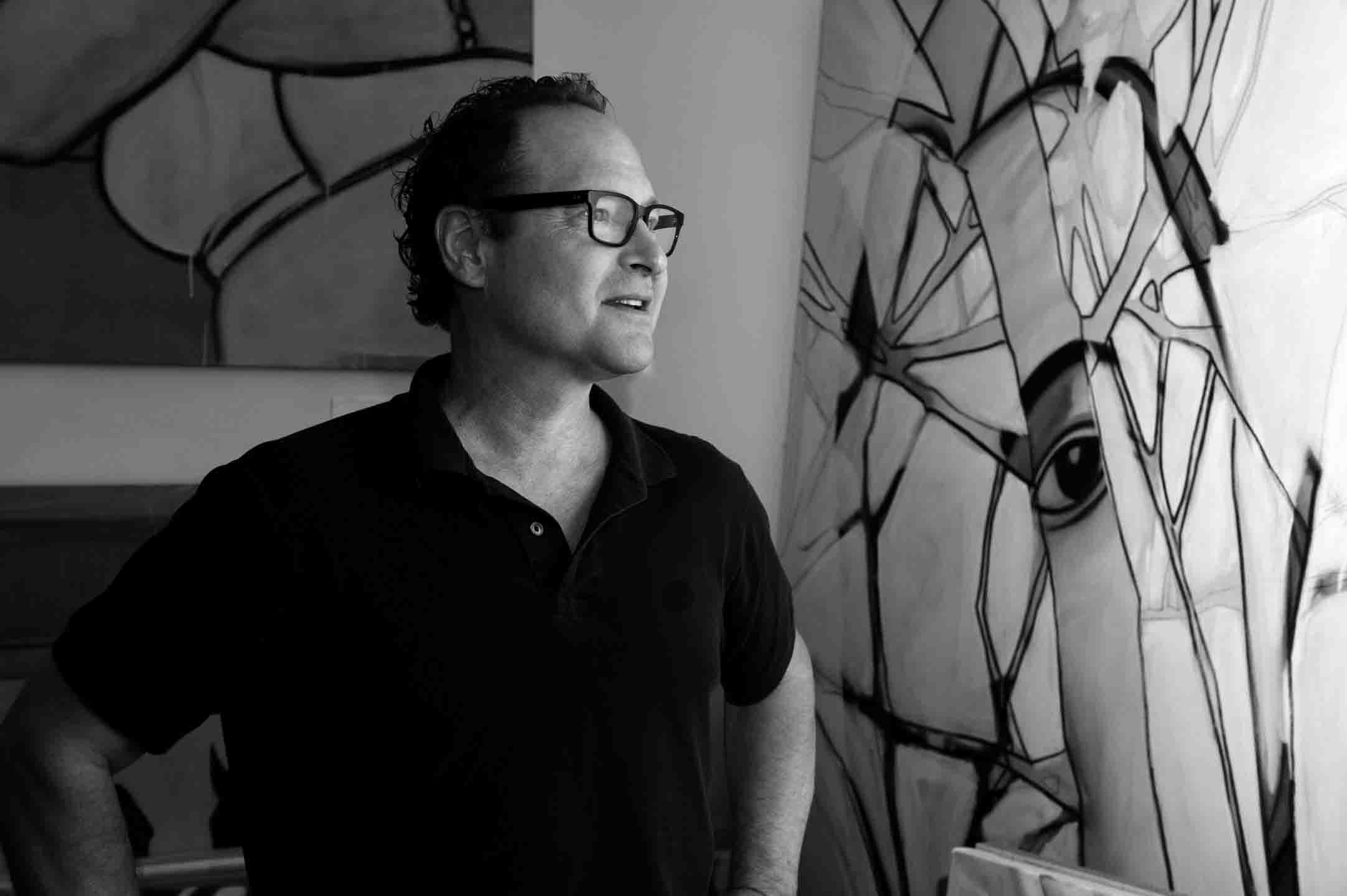
Jeff Schneider

Jeff Schneider (born 1960, Bethesda, Maryland) is an American artist.

== Life and work ==
Early on, Schneider showed a keen interest in photography often shooting and processing up to one hundred feet of black & white film a week. Growing increasingly tired of the representational aspects of photography, through darkroom manipulations, Schneider began to essentially abstract the "objectivity" of the camera lens. One of his professors at the University of South Florida suggested he enroll in a figure drawing and art theory class. Not long after these initial steps into fine art, Schneider attended the 1980 Picasso Retrospective at the Museum of Modern Art in New York City. This exhibition confirmed his desire to become an artist.

After he received his BFA in 1983 from Miami University, he worked as an Art Director in commercial design, painting at night in garages and basements until he acquired a studio in downtown Cincinnati. Soon after, he received a scholarship to the graduate painting program at the University of Cincinnati. Working with Robert Knipschild and Frank Herrmann he received his master's degree of Fine Art in 1989. Schneider moved to New York City in 1990 to pursue his career in art and quickly became an integral part of the vibrant painting scene there.

Early in New York, Schneider worked as a studio assistant for many of New York's most recognized artists, notably Moira Dryer, Ron Gorchov, Dorothea Rockburne, Janet Fish, Chuck Close and David Salle. By taking advantage of their generational perspectives, this allowed the young artist to see first hand the inner workings of not only their relevant studios but also the gallery system that these artist's worked within.

His early exhibitions included "Presentational Painting" curated by Sanford Wumfeld and Eileen Roaman at Hunter College and the “East-West Cultural Studies” painting show curated by Robert Storr, a relationship that led to numerous projects with Storr at the Museum of Modern Art. As scenes shifted, Schneider began to show his work with a gallery in Williamsburg, Brooklyn formed by Leah Stuhltrager and Cris Dam, which would lead to three group exhibitions. Schneider's work was seen as “A blending of male androgyny and American pop cultural” his reference to the "Cowboy Philosopher" "...reinforced the patriarchal power dynamic juxtaposed with the sometimes vulnerable and otherwise unassuming female character.” His canvases, "...Sophisticatedly staged by the artist, draw on inferences through association in our society and culture." The narratives struck an accord in the Brooklyn art scene as Schneider continued to exhibit throughout the borough as well as, Manhattan. The relationship with the Dam Stuhltrager Gallery led to his first international exhibition in Madrid, Spain. Schneider, along with Loren Munk, Cris Dam and William Powhida exhibited at Galeria ArteVeintiuno, curated by Javier Duero from the Museo Reina Sofia.

After the exhibition in Madrid Schneider continued to focus on the European art scene which led to numerous exhibitions with Hillsboro Fine Art in Dublin, Ireland. Aidan Dunne of the Irish Times declared Schneider's work as “lively explorations of the mythology of the cowboy-gunslinger, treated humorously and with deftness of touch.” Schneider has continued to exhibit in art fairs and galleries throughout Europe, as well as, exhibitions in Chicago, Miami and New York. He has exhibited with noted artists, Julian Schnabel, Ross Bleckner and Donald Baechler as well as other New York artists and has lectured on his work at Hunter College in New York and the Dun Laoghaire Institute of Art in Dublin.

The Oliver Sears Gallery represents Schneider's work in Europe and in the United States.

Schneider currently resides and works in New York City.

=== Selected exhibitions ===
- 2026 Lichtundfire Gallery / The Unknown / New York, NY
- 2026 Lichtundfire Gallery / Theseus's Craft / New York, NY
- 2025 Mosaic Art Space / Reflections on Disintegration / Queens, NY
- 2025 Oliver Sears Gallery / From the Land / London, Miami, Los Angeles
- 2023 Oliver Sears Gallery / In Residence III / London, UK
- 2022 HBU Art Museum / Ground Zero 360 / Houston, Texas
- 2021 Museum of Biblical Art / Ground Zero 360 / Dallas, Texas
- 2020 Oliver Sears Gallery / The Time of our Lives / Dublin, Ireland
- 2019 VUE art fair / Oliver Sears Gallery / Dublin, Ireland
- 2019 Mosaic Art Space / Solo Exhibition / Queens, New York
- 2019 SO Fine Art Editions / Summer Group Show / Dublin, Ireland
- 2019 Oliver Sears Gallery / In Living Memory at Emo Court / County Laois / Ireland
- 2019 Oliver Sears Gallery / Press Play / Dublin, Ireland
- 2018 VUE art fair / Oliver Sears Gallery / Dublin, Ireland
- 2018 Oliver Sears Gallery / Salon, Selected works / Dublin Ireland
- 2018 The Factory LIC / Summer Exhibition 2018 / Long Island City, NY
- 2017 ArtProv Gallery / Figure & Form / Providence, RI
- 2016 Oliver Sears Gallery / London Art Fair / London, UK
- 2015 ArtProv Gallery / Art Basel Miami Beach / Miami FL
- 2015 Oliver Sears Gallery / In Residence / London, UK
- 2015 ArtProv Gallery / Clothing Optional / Providence, RI
- 2015 One Art Space / Williamsburg on Warren / New York, New York
- 2015 Royal Hibernian Academy 185th Annual Exhibition / Dublin, Ireland
- 2015 Oliver Sears Gallery / Jeff Schneider & Nest Design / Dublin, Ireland
- 2014 ArtProv Gallery / Patterns and Perspectives / Providence, RI
- 2013 So Fine Art Editions / National Contemporary Art Fair 2013 / Dublin, Ireland
- 2012 Royal Hibernian Academy 182 Annual Exhibition (invited artist) / Dublin, Ireland
- 2011 Hillsboro Fine Art / New York Paintings / Ross Bleckner and Jeff Schneider / Dublin, Ireland
- 2011 Allen Gallery / Brooklyn Academy of Music / Annual Benefit Auction / Brooklyn, New York
- 2010 Allen Gallery / Brooklyn Academy of Music / Annual Benefit Auction / Brooklyn, New York
- 2009 Hillsboro Fine Art / New York Contemporary / Donald Baechler, Ross Bleckner, Julian Schnabel, Jeff Schneider / Dublin, Ireland
- 2009 Allen Gallery / Private ROOM / New York, New York
- 2008 Allen Gallery / Up For Grabs / New York, New York
- 2008 Dam Stuhltrager Gallery / Palette-Poles / Brooklyn, New York
- 2006 Galeria ArteVeintiuno / Swap-Americana / Madrid, Spain
- 2005 Dam Stuhltrager Gallery / These Days / Brooklyn, New York
