= Will Cotton =

American painter (born 1965)

- Born: 1965 (age 60–61); Melrose, Massachusetts
- Education: Cooper Union; New York Academy of Art
- Known for: Painting, sculpture
- Awards: Princess Grace Foundation award for contemporary art
- Website: https://willcotton.com/

Will Cotton (born 1965 in Melrose, Massachusetts, U.S.) lives and works in New York. The artist belongs to the generation of American painters who have taken the language of figurative style painting in a totally new direction. He works in his studio building giant confectionary-based assemblages, such as gingerbread houses, sweets, cake mountains and chocolate seas, opening the door to the creation of a new reality. Cotton sees his works as utopias that explore the notions of temptation and excess.

== Work ==
Cotton's works from the 1990s depicted pop icons sourced from contemporary advertisements such as the Nestlé Quick bunny - directly referencing visual modes aimed at evoking desire. Cotton described his early works in a 2008 interview, saying "My initial impulse to make these paintings really came out of an awareness of the commercial consumer landscape that we live in. Every day we're bombarded with hundreds, if not thousands of messages designed specifically to incite desire within us."

In 1996, Cotton began to develop an iconography in which the landscape itself became an object of desire. The paintings often feature scenery made up entirely of pastries, candy, and melting ice cream. He creates elaborate maquettes of these settings from real baked goods made in his Manhattan studio as a visual source for the final works. Since about 2002, nude or nearly nude pinup-style models have occasionally populated these candy-land scenes. As in the past, the works project a tactile indulgence in fanciful glut. The female characters are icons of indulgence and languor, reflecting the feel of the landscape itself. "These paintings are all about a very specific place," says Cotton, "It's a utopia where all desire is fulfilled all the time, meaning ultimately that there can be no desire, as there is no desire without lack."

== Influences ==
Interested in cultural iconography, Cotton's art makes use of the common language of consumer culture shared across geographical boundaries. He considers the visual threads in his work, drawn from imagery ranging from the Candy Land board game and gingerbread houses to pinup art and cotton candy, to be part of the popular culture lexicon. Cotton’s work also builds upon and updates the idea of land of milk and honey in European literature and art. Cotton states “The dream of paradise, of a land of plenty, is a thread that runs through all of human history, not just in the affluent times but in fact very often in the lean as well.” He has also been inspired by painters Frederic Edwin Church, François Boucher, and Fragonard, the photographer Carleton Watkins, as well as pin-up painters such as Gil Elvgren. Of his landscape painting influences, Cotton says,

I was initially drawn to the Hudson River School when I learned that many of the paintings were made specifically to incite a feeling of awe and a desire to experience the new frontier. This struck me as a particularly American kind of propagandist message that I wanted to reference in my paintings. I love the idea of showing ... what it might be like to experience such a place. —Will Cotton

== Career ==
Will Cotton has exhibited throughout the United States and Europe. He was represented by Mary Boone Gallery, New York, from 2000 until the gallery's closure in 2019. He is currently represented by Galerie Templon, Paris, Brussels, and New York and Baldwin Gallery, Aspen, Colorado. He has held solo exhibitions at the Cornell University College of Architecture, Art, and Planning, Ithaca (NY) (2015); the Orlando Museum of Art; and the Ringling College of Art & Design, Sarasota (FL) (2018). He has been a part of several group exhibitions at the San Francisco Museum of Modern Art (2000); the Seattle Art Museum (2002), the Kunsthalle Bielefeld, Germany (2004); the Hudson River Museum (2007); the Triennale di Milano, Italy (2007) the Musée Marmottan Monet, Paris (2008); the Museo Nacional de Bellas Artes, Havana (2009); the Kunstraum Potsdam, Germany (2021); and the Louvre-Lens Museum, Lens, France (2023).

His work is in the collections of the Seattle Art Museum, Washington, the Smithsonian American Art Museum, the Columbus Museum of Art, Ohio, the Orlando Museum of Art, Florida, The National Portrait Gallery, Washington D.C., and the Hallmark Collection, Kansas City.

In 2004 he received the Princess Grace Foundation award for contemporary art in Monaco. Will Cotton was awarded an honorary Doctorate from the New York Academy of Art where he was a senior critic in 2012.

== Other projects ==
Will Cotton installed a pop-up (model) French bakery art installation at Partners & Spade in Manhattan, New York. Confections and baked goods the artist used for visual reference were baked on site and were for sale over three weekends in November 2009. Bakery staff were fitted with custom-made tiaras of the kind Cotton paints atop the heads of many women in his paintings.

Cotton was the Artistic Director for Katy Perry's 2010 music video, California Gurls, which was based on themes and imagery from his paintings and painted the album cover for her 3rd studio album Teenage Dream.

In 2011, he debuted performance art work, Cockaigne for Performa 11, where he employed the forms of both ballet and burlesque to create a celebration of whipped cream and cotton candy.

In December 2012, Works & Process at the Guggenheim Museum collaborated with Cotton to present ten performances of Sergei Prokofiev's Peter & the Wolf as part of an annual tradition. Cotton brought the production to life with a newly commissioned installation, featuring free-standing, hand-painted characters set within a kinetic gingerbread chalet. Fashion designer Isaac Mizrahi narrated the performances, while George Manahan conducted the Juilliard Ensemble.

Cotton photographed actress Elle Fanning for the Spring 2013 Fashion Issue of New York Magazine, capturing her within sets he designed. In these photos, Fanning is often seen wearing clothing and accessories created by Cotton, which were inspired by the Spring 2013 collections.

At Will Cotton's suggestion, Ladurée's chefs created a new macaron flavor, Ginger-infused whipped cream. Inspired by this, Cotton painted an image of one of his favorite models, singer Hannah Cohen, wearing a whipped cream dress to embody the new confection. The painting was featured on a Ladurée box, which was sold at the "colette art DRIVE-THRU at alchemist" during Art Basel Miami and at Ladurée's New York Madison Avenue boutique in 2013.

In 2015, Will Cotton's painting was featured on the cover of the 25th Anniversary Issue of Martha Stewart Living. The collaboration between Cotton and Martha Stewart, which she described as "a painterly journey" to a confectionary fantasyland, resulted in an exquisite portrait and inspired a collection of dreamy holiday desserts.

Cotton participated in Art x Puzzles' "Puzzles with Purpose" initiative in 2020, a project designed to support contemporary artists during the COVID-19 pandemic. His painting Cotton Candy Cowboy was featured as part of an Unlimited Collector Edition jigsaw puzzle, helping raise funds for artists during the global crisis.

In 2025, Cotton presented a site-specific installation at Rockefeller Center as part of the Art in Focus program. The exhibition included a 125-foot mural installed beneath 45 Rockefeller Plaza, as well as sculptural displays in the building’s vitrines. The work featured recurring motifs from Cotton’s practice, such as cowboys, unicorns, and dessert-themed imagery. The installation was on view across multiple locations within the Rockefeller Center campus.
