= Gilles Barbier =

Vanuatuan artist

- Born: February 6, 1965 (age 61); Port Vila, New Hebrides, (now Vanuatu)
- Years active: 1992–present
- Known for: Contemporary Artist
- Website: https://www.studio-gilles-barbier.fr/

Gilles Barbier de Preville (born February 6, 1965) is a French contemporary artist and visual artist originally from Port Vila, New Hebrides, now the South Pacific nation Vanuatu. Gilles Barbier is known for his artwork in Marseille, France.

== Biography ==
Gilles Barbier was born on February 6, 1965, in Port Vila, New Hebrides, an Anglo-French condominium. When New Hebrides gained independence in 1980 and became the nation Vanuatu. At the age 20, he arrived at Europe in 1985, in France. Barbier then arrived at Marseille in 1989. On the same year, Barbier enrolled into the Faculty of Arts in Aix-en-Provence, than enterted the Marseille Luminy Art School.

== Exhibitions ==
- Le Cockpit, le Vaisseau, ce que l'on voit depuis le hublot, Espace Claude Berri, Paris, 2008
- Gilles Barbier, Galerie Vallois, Paris, 2007
- Gilles Barbier, curator: F. Cohen, Carré d'Art, France, 2006
- Marcel Duchamp Prize exhibition, Paris, 2005
- Gilles Barbier, Kunstverein Freiburg, Freibourg, Germany, 2004
- Gilles Barbier, Galerie Vallois, Paris, 2003
- Picnic Along the Path, Rena Bransten Gallery, San Francisco
- Le Bénévolat dans l'action, Galerie Vallois, 2001
- Pique-nique au bord du chemin, MAC Marseille, France 2001
- Jour de fête, Centre Georges Pompidou, Paris, 2000
- One Man Show, Galerie Vallois, Paris, 2000
- Venice Biennale, 1999
- Copywork: The Dictionary Pages and Other Diversions, curator: Diana C. du Pont, Santa Barbara Museum of Art, Santa Barbara, 1999
- Clones, Henry Art Gallery, Seattle, 1999
- Environnements corrigés, Espai Lucas, Valencia, Spain, 1999
- Hyper désir, Galerie Vallois, 1999
- Aux armes, etc., Kunstlerwerkstatt, Munich, 1998
- L'Autre, 4^{e} Contemporary Art Biennale, Lyon, 1997
- Containerize, Kunst-Werke, Berlin 1997
- Les Pages Roses: Eine Kopie der Welt von A-Aa, Offenes Kulturhaus, Linz, Austria, 1996
- Comment mieux guider notre vie au quotidien, Galerie Vallois, Paris, 1995

== Decorations ==
- Chevalier of the Order of Arts and Letters (2016)
