= Margaret Synge Dryer =

Canadian architect

Margaret "Pegeen" Synge Dryer (1921–1963) was a Canadian architect.

She was born Margaret Synge in Toronto and was educated in Dublin from 1925 to 1930 and in Toronto from 1930 to 1945, when she graduated from the University of Toronto with a BArch degree. Dryer received the Royal Architectural Institute of Canada gold medal on graduation. She also received a scholarship from the Ontario Association of Architects and the Toronto Brick Prize. She worked with architecture firm Mathers and Haldenby from 1945 to 1947 and with Fleury and Arthur from 1950 to 1951. During the 1940s, she presented weekly broadcasts on CBC Radio on renovation, house design and community planning. From 1952, she worked on her own as an architect.

Her projects included the Campbell Soup building in Simcoe, the Bell Telephone building, the Parisian laundry in Toronto and the Regent Park housing development.

In 1946, she married Douglas Dryer, a professor at the University of Toronto; the couple had three children. Her daughter Moira became an abstract artist. Her son Matthew Dryer is a professor of linguistics at the University at Buffalo. Her father was John Lighton Synge, an Irish mathematician and physicist. Her sister Cathleen Synge Morawetz is also a mathematician.

Dryer died in Toronto at the age of 42.
