= Hilary Harkness =

American painter (born 1971)

- Born: 1971 (age 54–55); Detroit, Michigan, U.S.
- Education: University of California, Berkeley, Yale University
- Occupation: Painter
- Spouse: Ara Tucker

Hilary Harkness (born 1971) is an American artist whose paintings frequently depict surreal worlds inhabited solely by women. She often portrays her female subjects as miniaturized figures set within complexly arranged mechanical or military environments, usually engaged in erotic, violent, or sado-masochistic scenarios. Her work has dealt with themes such as power, war and gender while exploring the subject of queerness through historical and fictionalized storytelling. Harkness has work included in the Whitney Museum of American Art collection, and she has had solo shows at the Mary Boone Gallery (now defunct) as well as the P.P.O.W. Gallery in Manhattan. She has lectured at institutions such as Colombia University, Yale University, the Baltimore Museum of Art, and the Herron School of Art at Indiana University Indianapolis. Harkness graduated with an undergraduate art degree from University of California, Berkeley and a master's in fine arts from Yale University.

== Early life and education ==
Hilary Harkness was born in 1971 in Detroit, Michigan. Her father worked at a paper mill and provided her with access to art materials, including large pieces of paper that Harkness would spread over her family's basement ping-pong table and draw on with crayons. She was encouraged to pursue art at a young age by her crafty parents and upstairs neighbor, an art teacher who would paint watercolors with young Harkness. After finishing her math and science studies early in high school, Harkness was able to spend ample time in her school's art classroom where she had the freedom to work on whatever artist project she wanted. Harkness also utilized this free time to further pursue her musical studies with the violin.

In 1993, Harkness graduated with a B.A. degree from University of California, Berkeley. When Harkness began attending university at UC Berkeley, she was a pre-med student aiming for a biochemistry degree path, however, she ended up switching over last minute to the art program. While pursuing her undergraduate degree, Harkness was strongly encouraged by her professor and fellow artist, Drew Beattie, to continue to study the arts instead of pivoting back to med school. Harkness's interest in learning how to paint took her to Paris in 1993 and, upon her return to the United States, she applied for Yale University where she earned an MFA degree in 1996.

In 2018, she was accepted to participate in the Metropolitan Museum of Art Copyist Program where she first began her exploration of Winslow Homer's "Prisoners from the Front” before creating her own series of 18 small scale works based on the Civil War era painting.

== Career ==
In 1999, Harkness moved to New York City in order to pursue her artistic endeavors to the best of her ability before deciding whether or not to pivot to a different field of work. In the city, Harkness visited galleries door to door with slides of her work. One of the dealers that Harkess was particularly persistent with kept one of her paintings over a weekend. leading to its purchase by Beth Rudin DeWoody from the art dealer's back room in the Bill Maynes Gallery (now defunct). The Bill Maynes Gallery also held Harkness's first solo show.

Harkness was first introduced to the art dealer Mary Boone in 2001 after curator Max Henry placed Harkness in a group show called "View (Five): Westworld" at Mary Boone's Gallery in New York. It wasn't until 2003, after Harkness and a friend crashed a Mary Boone dinner party at Bottino, that Harkness was invited to be a part of Boone's gallery. The Mary Boone Gallery was closed in 2019 after founder Mary Boone was sent to federal prison for tax fraud, leading Harkness to join P.P.O.W Gallery in Manhattan. At P.P.O.W, Harkness had a solo exhibit in 2023. This show was Harkness's largest showcase as of 2023, and it featured her work from 2007-2023 including the artist's "Arabella Freeman Series", "At Home, At War: Life with Alice and Gertrude" series, and 2018 painting "Experienced People Needed".

Harkness's work has been featured in a variety of exhibitions at several other notable institutions such as Museo Thyssen-Bornemisza (Madrid, Spain), American Academy of Arts and Letters (New York, NY), Portland Institute for Contemporary Art (Portland, OR) and The Aldrich Contemporary Art Museum (Ridgefield, CT). In 2015, Harkness was also featured in the FLAG Art Foundation's "Disturbing Innocence" exhibition alongside artists Cindy Sherman and Roy Lichtenstein. Acclaimed artist Eric Fischl was the curator and a featured artist in the "Disturbing Innocence" exhibition. Harkness herself co-curated "Roy Lichtenstein: Nudes and Interiors" at The FLAG Art Foundation in 2014.

Harkness draws on literature, history, and women’s studies to create detailed technical paintings. Due to the high level of detail found in Harkness's work, she typically produces no more than five paintings a year. Her small paintings are usually priced at US$250,000, making her one of the most highly valued artists per square inch, at just age 31.

In her early artwork, Harkness created lesbian utopias that are populated exclusively with women depicted in re-imagined World War II historical scenes inspired by the death of Harkness's WWII veteran grandfather's death in 1999. These early artworks consisted of small drawings and oil paintings that are scientifically detailed creating futuristic industrial worlds filled with sexy doll-like figurines as seen in artworks like wavy "Sinking the Bismark" (2003). The characters within the artworks are not giggling and gossiping rather they are often violent and overtly sexual creating a world where violence and sex are intertwined and have no consequences. Harkness's early artwork can be characterized as cross-sections of buildings and battleships with hyper specific scenic details based on historical research with lots of small figures depicted in them.

In the mid-2000s, Harkness began to change and evolve her signature style with the goal to create medium-sized paintings larger figures. Harkness's 2007-2016 series, "At Home, At War: Life with Alice and Gertrude", consisted of six painting that explored a different narrative behind the historically tumultuous homosexual relationship between Alice B. Toklas and Gertrude Stein. Harkness's 2019 - 2023 series on the fictional Arabella Freeman and the imagined Freeman family based on Ara Tucker, Harkness's wife, questioned historical omissions about Civil War era life for Black and queer Americans. The Arabella Freeman Series was inspired by Winslow Homer's "Prisoners from the Front” which Harkness confronted during her time in the Metropolitan Museum of Art Copyist Program.

== Personal life ==
Harkness married Ara Tucker, the woman who inspired the artist's "Arabella Freeman" series, in 2015. This was the second marriage for Harkness.

== Awards ==
- Willard L. Metcalf Award (2002)
- Louis Comfort Tiffany Foundation Award (2003)
- Rosenthal Family Foundation Award (2009)
- Henry Clews Award (2017)

== Further readings ==
- "Hilary Harkness: Everything for You", Black Dog Press, 2024
