= George Herms =

American artist (1935–2026)

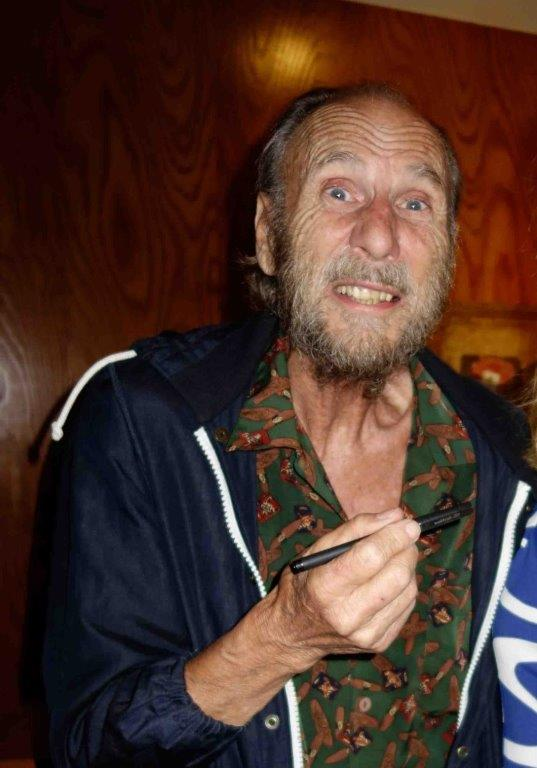
- Herms in 2015
- Born: George Herbert Herms; July 5, 1935; Woodland, California, U.S.
- Died: April 24, 2026 (aged 90); Irvine, California, U.S.
- Education: University of California, Berkeley
- Known for: Assemblages, paper works, poetry
- Style: Assemblage
- Movement: Beat Generation
- Partner(s): Sue Henger (since c. 2007)
- Children: 4

George Herbert Herms (July 5, 1935 – April 24, 2026) was an American artist best known for the assemblages he created out of discarded, often rusty, dirty or broken every-day objects, and juxtaposing those objects so as to infuse them with poetry, humor, and meaning. He was also known for his works on paper, including works with ink, collage, drawing, paint, and poetry. The prolific Herms also created theater pieces, about which he said, "I treat it as a Joseph Cornell box big enough that you can walk around in. It's just a continuation of my sculpture, one year at a time." Prominent curator Walter Hopps, who met Herms in 1956, "placed Herms on a dazzling continuum of assemblage artists that includes Pablo Picasso, Kurt Schwitters, Marcel Duchamp, and Joseph Cornell, as well as California luminaries Wallace Berman and Edward Kienholz", according to the Santa Monica Museum of Art; the Museum identified Herms as a member of the West Coast Beat Generation, and said that he credited Wallace Berman with "teaching him that any object, even a mundane cast-off, could be of great interest if contextualized properly". "That’s my whole thing", Herms said. "I turn shit into gold. I just really want to see something I've never seen before." Herms lived and worked in Irvine, California.

== Early life and education ==
George Herms was born in Woodland, California, on July 5, 1935. His grandfather, William Brodbeck Herms, was a professor of entomology at the University of California, Berkeley, and his father was an agricultural adviser who worked for Yolo County. During World War II, Herms was sent by his parents to the College of Engineering at Berkeley, where, he said, he "lasted six weeks, till football season was over".

Subsequently, he worked for Remington Rand, on the Universal Automatic Computer (UNIVAC), before leaving for Mexico and other travels. He said in an interview that his parents had offered him $100 per month to return to college, so he took the money and "bought some jazz records and lived on 13 dollars a month", and returned to Los Angeles, living for some time in Topanga Canyon, where he met the artist Wallace Berman on Herms's 20th birthday. Herms helped Berman hang his first show in 1957 at the Ferus Gallery. Reportedly, Herms decided to become an artist when a transient sat down next to him in a Sacramento bus depot and said, "There's the makers, the takers, and the fakers. Which will you be?" Herms did not have formal art school education, yet he was called the "godfather of West Coast assemblage art". During the late 1950s, Herms resided in a number of different cities in California, including Berkeley, Larkspur, and Hermosa Beach before returning for a short period of time to Topanga in 1961. In 1959, Herms became an original member of Bruce Conner's Rat Bastard Protective Association.

== Teaching and residencies ==
Herms was a lecturer in Studio Art at University of California, Irvine, and University of California, Los Angeles (UCLA); Sculpture at UCLA and University of California, San Diego; and, Public Art at the Santa Monica College of Design, Art and Architecture. From 1977 to 1979, he was a Visiting Artist at California State University, Fullerton. In 1981, Herms was an artist in residence at the University of Denver in Colorado, and in 1991 an artist in residence at The Robbins Foundation in Philadelphia, Pennsylvania. In 1994, he was an artist in residence at Otis College of Art and Design in Los Angeles.

== Personal life and death ==
Herms had 6 marriages, all of which ended in divorce. He had 4 children, two from his second marriage and two from his fourth. His last relationship was a domestic partnership with Sue Henger for 17 years.

Herms died at his home in Irvine, California, on April 24, 2026, at the age of 90.

== Selected exhibitions ==
=== Solo exhibitions ===
One of Herms's earliest solo shows, "Secret Exhibitions", was mounted in 1957 in Hermosa Beach. Herms was the subject of many other one-person exhibitions, including shows organized by the Semina Gallery in Larkspur, California (1960); the Batman Gallery in San Francisco (1961); two shows at Rolf Nelson Gallery in Los Angeles (1963, 1966); two shows at the Molly Barnes Gallery (1969, 1970); a retrospective of works from 1960 to 1972 at California State University, Los Angeles (1972) and the Memorial Union Art Gallery at UC Davis (1973), for which catalogues were produced; a show at TJB Gallery in Newport Beach, California (1975) called "Pseudonymphia" and featuring the work of several of Herms's imaginary artists such as Paul Mistrie, Eric Hammerscoffer, Iris Firewater, Sigmund Fletcher, and Astropoet Moonstone (Tarzan Feathers was not included in the show); several shows at L.A. Louver in Venice, California (1976, 1982, 1986, 1989); a retrospective exhibition at Newport Harbor Art Museum in Newport Beach, California (1979), which traveled and for which a catalogue was produced; a show at the Orange County Center for Contemporary Art in Santa Ana, California (1980); an exhibition at the University of Denver Art Gallery (1981); a show at California State University at Fullerton (1984); a show at the Oscarsson/Siegeltuch Gallery in New York (1986); a show at the Tyler Gallery at Temple University in Philadelphia (1988); a retrospective organized at the Los Angeles Municipal Art Gallery for which a catalogue was produced (1992); a show at Redbud Gallery in Houston, Texas (2002); a show at Seraphin Gallery, Philadelphia (2002), for which a catalogue was produced; two shows at Ace Gallery in Los Angeles (2003, 2004); a retrospective exhibition curated by Walter Hopps at the Santa Monica Museum of Art (2005); a show at Franklin Parrasch Gallery in New York (2006); a show at Galerie Vallois, Paris (2007); a show at Susan Inglett Gallery, New York (2008); an avant-garde "jazz opera" performed at REDCAT Gallery, CalArts’ experimental art venue (2011); a show at OHWOW Gallery in Los Angeles (2013); "George Herms: On and Off the Wall" at Louis Stern Fine Arts in Los Angeles (2013); and the show "LOVE: George Herms" curated by Sarah Bancroft at testsite in Austin, Texas (2014).

=== Group exhibitions ===
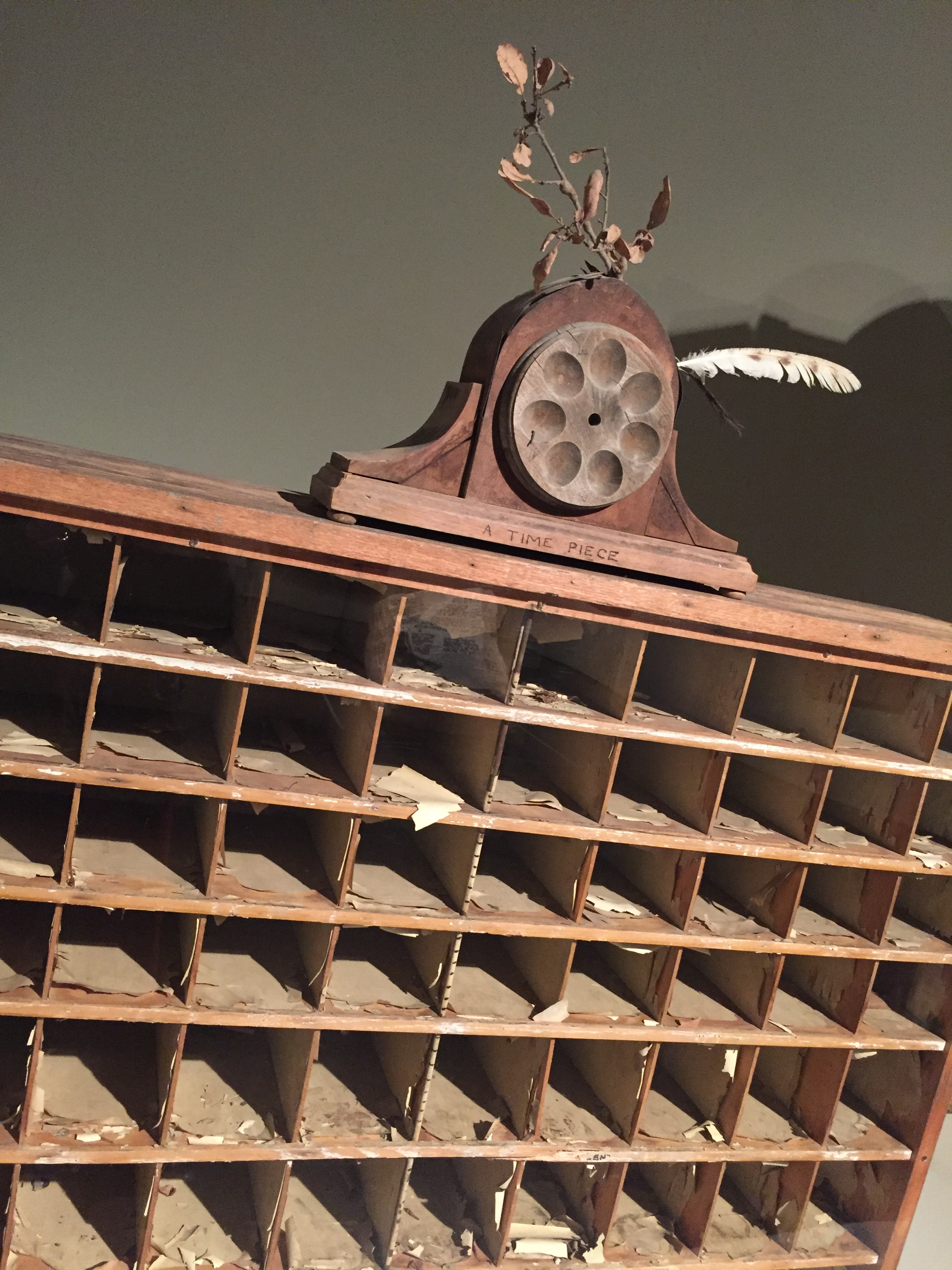
A Time Piece, 1976, by Herms.

Herms's work was selected for group exhibitions, beginning with the "Gangbang" exhibition in 1960 at the Batman Gallery in San Francisco.

The following year Herms was included in the ground-breaking exhibition "The Art of Assemblage" at the Museum of Modern Art in New York, which traveled to a number of other venues and produced a catalog, and Herms's work was selected for inclusion in "Object Makers" at Pomona College in Claremont. In 1963, his work appeared in the group exhibition "California Collage Show" at the Pasadena Museum of Art in Pasadena, California and was also selected for "Fifty California Artists", an exhibition at the Whitney Museum of American Art in New York, which exhibition traveled and produced a catalog. In 1964, his work was included in "Sterling Holloway Collection" at UCLA. In 1967, he participated in the group exhibition "Selection, 1967: Recent Acquisitions in Modern Art", at the University of San Diego, California (1980), which produced a catalogue; The next year, the University of California, Irvine, chose Herms's works for incliusion in the exhibition "Assemblage in California". Following his participation in other major group exhibitions in the 1960s, Herms's work continued to be selected for major group exhibitions in the 1970s, including: "Tableaux d'Aujourd'hui" at Maitre Binoche in Paris (1971); "Surrealism is Alive and Well in the West", at the Baxter Gallery at Caltech in Pasadena, California (1972), which produced a catalogue; "Kurt Schwitters and Related Developments", at the La Jolla Museum of Contemporary Art (1973); "Poets of the Cities of New York and San Francisco 1950–1965", Dallas Museum of Fine Arts (1974), which traveled and produced a catalogue; and, in 1974, Herms was selected for exhibitions at Giancarlo Bocchi Gallery in Milan, Italy, Nicholas Wilder Gallery in Los Angeles, and by the Otis Library, at the Otis Art Institute in Los Angeles, California; "Other Voices" at Mount Holyoke College in Massachusetts (1975); "Assemblage" and "3 Los Angeles Sculptors" at the Los Angeles Institute of Contemporary Art (1975); "Great Egg Sale" at the Newport Harbor Art Museum (1976); "Painting and Sculpture in California: The Modern Era" at the San Francisco Museum of Modern Art (1976–1977), which traveled and was catalogued; "3 Generations-Studies in Collage", Margo Leavin Gallery in Los Angeles (1978); and "100 + Directions in Southern California Art", Los Angeles Institute of Contemporary Art (1978). Herms was included in a number of important group exhibitions in the 1980s, including "Recent Acquisitions" at the Newport Harbor Art Museum (1980); "Major Works" at L.A. Louver Gallery (1980); "Sculpture in California 1975–1980" at the San Diego Art Museum in San Diego, California. "Furnishings by Artists" at the Art Gallery at Otis Art Institute of the Parsons School of Design in Los Angeles (1980), which produced a catalogue; "Southern California Artists 1940–1980" at the Laguna Beach Museum of Art in Laguna Beach, California (1981), which produced a catalogue; "Collage and Assemblage" at the Mississippi Museum of Art in Jackson, Mississippi (1981), which traveled and produced a catalogue; a group show at Los Angeles Contemporary Exhibitions (LACE) (1981); "Humor in Art" at the Los Angeles Institute of Contemporary Art (1981); "California: A Sense of Individualism" at L.A. Louver Gallery in Venice California (1981); "California: The State of Landscape 1972–1981" at Newport Harbor Art Museum (1981), which traveled and produced a catalogue; "The West as Art" at Palm Springs Desert Museum in Palm Springs, California (1982), which produced a catalogue; "Contemporary Triptychs" at Galleries of the Claremont Colleges in Claremont (1982); "American/European Painting and Sculpture" at L.A. Louver Gallery (1983); "Boxed Art" at Laguna Beach Museum of Art (1983); "Annual Exhibition, American Academy in Rome" in Rome, Italy (1983), which traveled and produced a catalogue; "Collage, The Americans" at The Museum of Fine Arts in Houston, Texas (1983), which produced a catalogue; "Contemporary Collage: Extensions" at Galleries of the Claremont Colleges (1983), which produced a catalogue; "Narrative Sculpture" at Palm Springs Desert Museum (1984), which produced a catalogue; "American/European: Painting, Drawing, and Sculpture" at L.A. Louver Gallery (1984); "Gala, Gala" at The Museum of Contemporary Art (MOCA), Los Angeles (1985); "American/European: Painting and Sculpture" at L.A. Louver Gallery (1985); "San Francisco: 1945–1965" at the Oakland Museum in Oakland, California (1985), which produced a catalogue; "Sculpture and Sculptor's Drawings" at the L.A. Louver Gallery (1986); "Shrines and Altars" at Kohler Arts Center in Sheboygan, Wisconsin (1986); "Recent Acquisitions" at the Los Angeles County Museum of Art (LACMA) in Los Angeles (1987); "Assemblage" at Kent Fine Art, Inc. in New York (1987), which produced a catalogue; "Artists Against AIDS" at Pacific Design Center in Los Angeles (1988), which produced a catalogue; "Loans from the Norton Simon Museum" at LACMA (1988); "Poetic Objects" at the San Antonio Museum of Art in San Antonio, Texas (1988–1989), which traveled and produced a catalogue; "Rezoning (Bill Bissett, George Herms, Jess and Al Neil)" at Vancouver Art Gallery in British Columbia, Canada (1989), which produced a catalogue; "Artists Against AIDS" at Pacific Design Center (1989), which produced a catalogue; "The 'Junk Aesthetic': Assemblage of the 1950s and Early 1960s" at the Whitney Museum of American Art, Fairfield County Branch in Stamford, Connecticut (1989), which traveled; and "Forty Years of California Assemblage" at the Wight Art Gallery at UCLA (1989), which traveled and produced a catalogue.

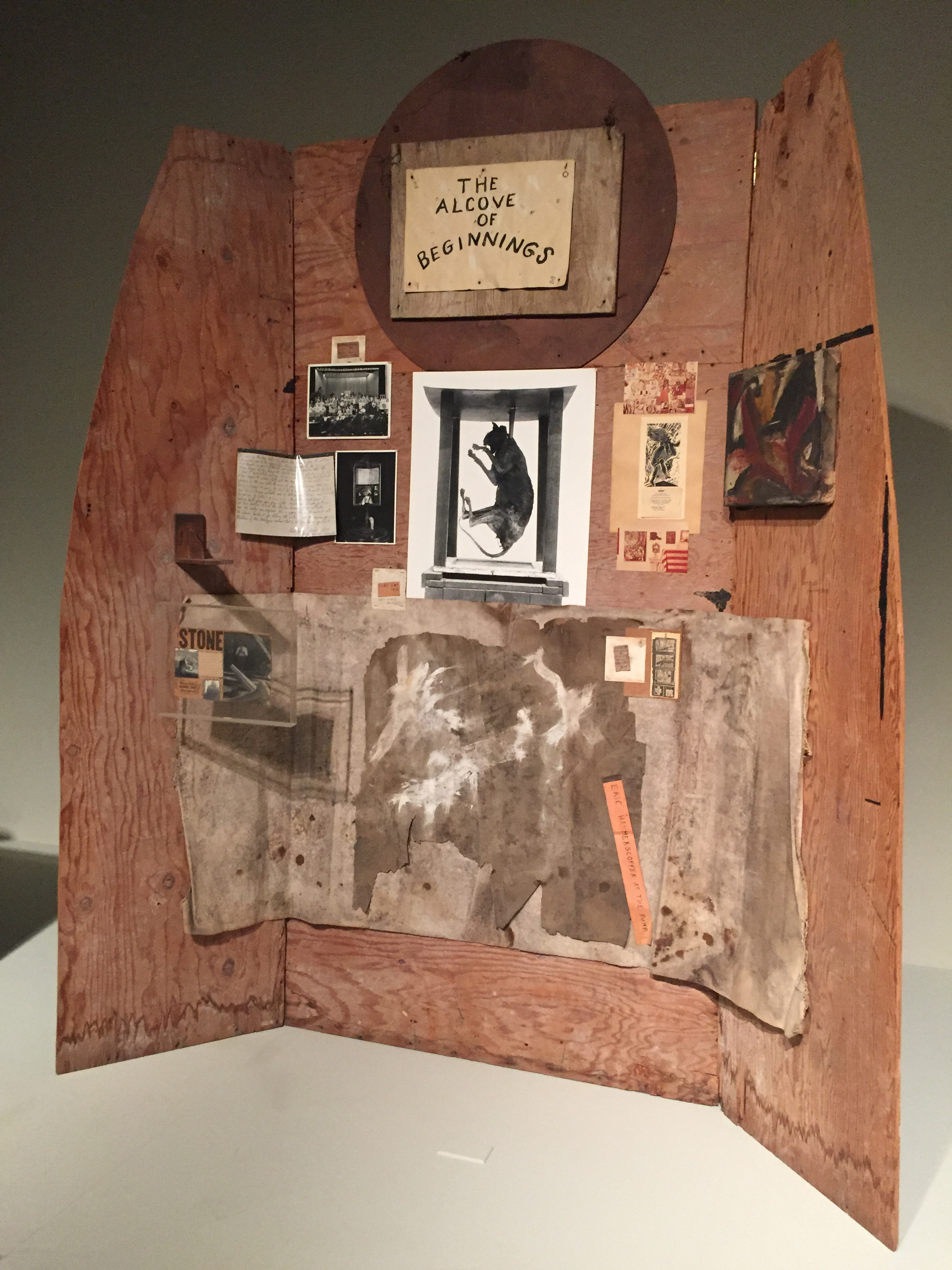
The Alcove of Beginnings, 1979, by Herms.

Herms participated in major group exhibitions in the 1990s, including "The Denim Jacket Show" at the Newport Harbor Art Museum (1990); "Novel Ideas" at the Laguna Art Museum in Laguna Beach (1990); "Crossing the Line: Word and Image in Art" at the Montgomery Gallery at Pomona College in Claremont, California (1990); "Artist's Artists" at Long Beach Museum of Art in Long Beach, California (1990); "Wallace Berman, Bruce Conner, Jay DeFeo, George Herms and Jess" at Nicole Klagsbrun Gallery, New York (1991); "California Artist's Books" at The Armory Center in Pasadena, California (1991); "Poem Makers: Wallace Berman, George Herms and Jess" at L.A. Louver Gallery in Los Angeles (1992); and, "Sight, Vision: The Urban Milieu #3 (Wallace Berman, Bruce Conner, Jay DeFeo, Wally Hedrick, George Herms, and Jess") at Gallery Paule Anglim in San Francisco (1992). In 2011, Herms was the focus of a group show at the Museum of Contemporary Art at the Pacific Design Center in Los Angeles entitled "Xenophilia (Love of the Unknown)". Herms was included in the exhibition, "Two Schools of Cool" at the Orange County Museum of Art in Newport Beach, CA (2011), curated by Sarah Bancroft. Herms's work was included in the 2016–2017 exhibition "Based on a True Story: Highlights from the di Rosa Collection" at di Rosa, Napa, curated by Amy Owen.

== Public art ==
Herms created works for public art commissions, including "Clock Tower Monument in Unknown" at the MacArthur Public Art Program in Los Angeles (1987); "Moon Dial" in Beverly Hills, California (1988); and, "Portals to Poetry" in Citicorp Plaza in Los Angeles (1989).

== Visiting artist, artist residencies and teaching ==
- 2009: Lecturer in Drawing and Painting, California State University, Fullerton, California
- 2006: Artist-in-Residence, Skowhegan School of Painting and Sculpture, Madison, Maine
- 1991–1998: Lecturer in Sculpture, Santa Monica College of Design, Art and Architecture, Santa Monica, California
- 1994: Lecturer in Sculpture, Otis/Parsons, Los Angeles, California
- 1991: Artist in Residence, The Robbins Foundation, Philadelphia, Pennsylvania
- 1987–1994: Lecturer in Sculpture, University of California, Los Angeles, California
- 1987: Lecturer in Sculpture, Otis/Parsons, Los Angeles, California
- 1985: Lecturer in Sculpture, University of California, San Diego, California
- 1981: Artist in Residence, University of Denver, Colorado
- 1980–1981: Lecturer in Sculpture, University of California, Los Angeles, California
- 1977–1979: Visiting Artist, California State University, Fullerton, California
- 1976: Lecturer in Studio Art, University of California, Irvine, California

== Awards and honors ==
In 1962, artist Jess Collins and poet Robert Duncan awarded Herms the "Servant of Holy Beauty" Award. From the National Endowment for the Arts, Herms received three Individual Fellowships in 1968, 1977 and 1984, respectively. Herms was also awarded the Rome Prize, Fellowship in Sculpture from The American Academy in Rome from 1982 to 1983. Herms was subsequently granted a Guggenheim Fellowship in Sculpture from 1983 to 1984. In 1987, he was awarded a Working Grant from the Pollock Krasner Foundation and, in 1989, he was a Finalist in the "Pico Seagate" competition. Herms also received the 1998 Adolph and Esther Gottlieb Foundation Award and a Fellowship at the Getty Research Institute in 2000.
