= Julia Wachtel =

American painter (born 1956)

- Born: July 24, 1956 (age 70); New York City, New York
- Education: Middlebury College; School of Visual Arts, New York City; Whitney Independent Study Program
- Known for: Painting, Mixed media
- Website: juliawachtel.com

Julia Wachtel (/wɒkˈtɛl/; born 1956) is a contemporary American painter associated with the Pictures Generation. Since the late 1970s, her work has been based in the appropriation of imagery from mass media and popular culture. Starting with magazines and greeting cards, she later turned to the internet, social media, and clip-art for her source material. Her signature style involves silkscreening these elements onto canvas alongside hand-painted panels. Wachtel often builds multi-panel compositions that pair cartoon and other commercial imagery with photographs of pop stars, political figures, post-industrial landscapes, and media spectacles.

Critics and institutions have consistently noted the way in which Wachtel distills images, undermining their original logic and leading the viewer into an examination of a media dominated world. Flash Art writes that her style creates "a new disrupted space" for imagery, compelling viewers to recontextualize the media they consume on a daily basis. The Cleveland Museum of Art describes her as an artist who "appropriates popular imagery to critique an increasingly media-saturated society," and argued that her shift from print to internet sources has made her work "more relevant than ever." Comparing her to Mike Kelley, Frieze describes Wachtel's work as a "darkly subversive use of popular culture and objects as a form of social commentary."

Wachtel's work is held in the permanent collections of the Addison Gallery of American Art, the Blanton Museum, the Brooklyn Museum, the Cleveland Museum of Art, FRAC Champagne-Ardenne, MAMCO Geneva, the Museum of Contemporary Art, Los Angeles, the Museum of Modern Art, the Whitney Museum of American Art, The Phillips Collection, and the Zabludowicz Collection.

== Life and education ==
Wachtel was born in New York City in 1956. She attended Middlebury College, earning a BA in art, before studying at the School of Visual Arts in New York, where her teachers included Vito Acconci, Joseph Kosuth, Joan Jonas. She then studied at the Whitney Independent Study Program.

For a period of about ten years beginning in the early 2000s, Wachtel stepped back from her active exhibition schedule while raising her two children as a single mother and working as production manager of the UK edition of Vanity Fair magazine, based in New York.

== Work ==
=== Early work (1970s–2000s) ===
Wachtel first exhibited at MoMA PS1, presenting a film and audio installation, Follow the Leader (1979). The piece combined two Super 8 films, one of couples combing one another's hair on a bluff and another of a hand assembling a face from vinyl cutouts. These films were set to fragmented soap opera dialogue. Wachtel later described this structure as a "linear collage," built on rhythm and juxtaposition rather than narrative.

By the early 1980s, Wachtel had begun her Narrative Collapse series, arranging sequences of commercial posters depicting figures such as Judy Garland, Che Guevara, and Elvis Presley in strips, with portrait silhouettes drawn in black marker over each image. In 1984, she had her first solo exhibition at Gallery Nature Morte where she showed a series of vertical paintings combining images lifted from folk art and pop culture.

According to Bob Nickas, "Wachtel's major statement from the mid-'80s is her series Emotional Appeal (1986), a dozen paintings that alternate in their hanging from cartoon to primitive figures." This series introduced Wachtel's horizontal format that she continues to use to the present.

In 1987, Wachtel initiated her Celebrity series. Her Landscape series followed, with works focused on events of global consequence: the nuclear meltdown at Chernobyl, protests in Tiananmen Square, the fall of the Berlin Wall, among others. In both series, Wachtel silkscreened photographic reproductions from magazines and newspapers onto canvas alongside hand-painted cartoon figures, creating the impression of a cinematic sequence. In What, What, What (1988), a cartoon figure from a novelty greeting card sits alongside a paparazzi photograph of an unidentified female celebrity in a fur coat with her face hidden behind a mask. ArtReview observed that "the combination clearly invites a reading to do with desire and concealment," adding that the fundamental message of Wachtel's work centers on the "obscurity of meaning."

In the 1990s, Wachtel's American Color series paired monochrome panels with silkscreened portraits taken from daytime television talk shows, isolated against expanses of flat color. Critic Gabriel Coxhead described the series as evoking "contemporary culture itself…simply scrolling away incoherently." In 1991, the Museum of Contemporary Art Chicago organized her first one-person museum show. In 1993 Wachtel had her second solo exhibition at American Fine Arts in New York.

=== Later work (2010s–present) ===
In 2013, a solo show at Vilma Gold in London, Post Culture served as a miniature survey of her career. In 2014, the Cleveland Museum of Art organized her second solo institutional show at the museum's Transformer Station. A catalogue was published by Yale University Press, with essays by Reto Thüring and Quinn Latimer. Also in 2014, Wachtel exhibited at the Bergen Kunsthall in Norway. In reviewing the show for Frieze Magazine, critic Kathy Noble describes the work as questioning "how we can read and interpret the act of representation critically, in order to consider how it may or may not function as a form of 'authenticity' and 'truth'".

Wachtel's 2015 and 2017 solo exhibitions at Elizabeth Dee Gallery in New York brought direct engagement with meme culture and political spectacle. One painting contrasted Kim Jong-un with South Korean pop star Psy, whose "Gangnam Style" was then the most-viewed video in YouTube history; another placed a silkscreened Hillary Clinton alongside painted prehistoric Venus sculptures. Wachtel's 2019 solo show Help was the final show at Mary Boone's Chelsea gallery prior to its closing.

Due to the COVID-19 pandemic in 2020, Wachtel began making short videos, pulling clips from television and commercials into looped sequences featured in the online exhibition Passing Time. In early 2021, Wachtel had a solo exhibition, Fulfillment, at Helena Anrather in New York. Writing in the New York Times, Will Heinrich described Wachtel's paintings as portraying "an alternate reality, one in which America's disintegrating public discourse is replaced by the narrow but reliable certainties of art." In 2022, she presented Believe at Super Dakota in Brussels, including the painting "Airport", a large-scale multi-panel work depicting an airport terminal filled with directional signage and embedded stock-image watermarks. Wachtel described the effect as "informational overload, in a liminal space between unknown points." Flash Art wrote that the show "demonstrates once again her deep understanding of the power of images." Arthur Solway, writing in Electra Magazine in 2025, argued that throughout her forty year career, "Wachtel's central concerns or imperatives have addressed many of our most pressing issues that continue to this present day: class, inequity, injustice, degradation, and power." In 2026, she was included in the sixth edition of Greater New York at MoMA PS1, where she had first exhibited in 1979.

== Exhibitions ==
Wachtel's work has been exhibited in the Whitney Museum, Museum of Modern Art (MoMA), Cleveland Museum of Art, The Phillips Collection, Musée d'art moderne et contemporain (MAMCO Geneva), Hirshhorn Museum and Sculpture Garden, Milwaukee Art Museum, Museum of Contemporary Art Chicago, Museum of Fine Arts, Boston, The Contemporary Austin, Walker Art Center, Albertina Modern (Vienna), Bergen Kunsthall, Le Consortium (Dijon), Institute of Contemporary Arts (London), Migros Museum (Zurich), Saatchi Gallery (London), among others. In addition, she received an award from the Joan Mitchell Foundation.
