= Martin Kersels =

American artist (born 1960)

- Born: 1960 (age 65–66); Los Angeles, California, U.S.
- Known for: Performance Art, Sculpture
- Movement: Contemporary Art
- Awards: John Simon Guggenheim Fellowship (2008), Fellows of Contemporary Art Fellowship (2008), Foundation for Contemporary Arts Grants to Artists Award (1999)

Martin Kersels (born 1960) is an American contemporary artist. Kersels' work is largely installation based, incorporating sculpture, photography and video. Kersels is a professor of sculpture and director of graduate studies at the Yale School of Art.

== Early life ==
Kersels was born in Los Angeles in 1960. He received his received his Master of Fine Arts degree from the UCLA School of the Arts and Architecture in 1995.

== Academic career ==
In 1999 Kersels and author/artist Leslie Dick were jointly selected "to run the arts program" at CalArts at the California Institute of the Arts (CalArts). Kersels served as co-director of the CalArts Program in Art until he moved to the Yale School of Art, where in 2012 he became an associate professor and director of graduate studies in sculpture.

== Exhibitions ==
2010

- "2010: Whitney Biennial", The Whitney Museum of American Art, New York, US

2009

- Fat Iggy: Discography, Galerie Georges-Philippe & Nathalie Vallois, Paris, France
- "Fat Iggy", Guido Costa Projects, Torino, Italy
- "California Video", The J. Paul Getty Museum, Los Angeles, US

2008

- "Headache and Other New Works", ACME., Los Angeles, US
- Heavyweight Champion, Santa Monica Museum of Art, US

2007

- Heavyweight Champion, The Frances Young Tang Teaching Museum, Saratoga, US

2006

- Tumble Room/Deitch Projects, Art Unlimited, Art 37 Basel, Basel, Switzerland
- Charms in a Throne Room, ACME, Los Angeles, US

2005

- Orchestra for Idiots, Galerie Georges-Philippe & Nathalie Vallois, Paris, France

2004

- Wishing Well, ACME, Los Angeles, US.
- Illuminous, Guido Costa Project, Turin, Italy.

2002

- Fat Man, Galerie Georges-Philippe & Nathalie Vallois, Paris, France
- Bracelet, Peggy Phelps Gallery, Claremont Graduate University, US
- Martin Kersels, Showette / John Sonsini Recent Paintings, ACME Gallery, Los Angeles, US

2001

- Tumble Room Deitch Projects, New York.

== Collections ==
- Centre Georges Pompidou, Paris, France
- Museum of Modern Art, New York
- Santa Monica Museum of Art, Santa Monica
- Orange County Museum of Art, Newport Beach
- Hammer Museum, Los Angeles
- Museum of Contemporary Art, Los Angeles, Los Angeles
- Los Angeles County Museum of Art, Los Angeles
- Museum of Contemporary Art, North Miami
- Fonds national d'art contemporain, Paris, France
- Centre national des arts plastiques, Paris, France
- Whitney Museum of American Art, New York
- Madison Museum of Contemporary Art, Madison, WI
- The Francis Tang Teaching Museum, Saratoga, NY
- Schwartz Art Collection, Harvard Business School, Cambridge, MA
- Henry Art Gallery, Seattle, Washington

== Awards ==
Kersels was a 2008 Guggenheim Fellow.
