= Antoine de Margerie =

French painter (1941–2005)

- Born: 17 November 1941; Cusset
- Died: 9 February 2005 (aged 63); Paris
- Known for: Painter

Antoine de Margerie (17 November 1941, Cusset – 9 February 2005), was an abstract painter from a family of French diplomats.

== Formation ==
Following a childhood in Paris and the Auvergne, Antoine de Margerie lived with his parents in a number of diplomatic postings, in Madrid, Washington, Rome and Berlin. In 1953, he joined his grandfather André Lefebvre de La Boulaye, another diplomat, in Paris. At the Lycée Saint-Louis-de-Gonzaque, he obtained his bacalaureat. Art was already part of his background because an uncle, Paul de Laboulaye (1902–1961) was a painter who encouraged the adolescent Antoine in his interest. One of the artists whose paintings hang in the family apartments is Pierre Bonnard. Another family member, Paul-Antoine, known as Paul de la Boulaye (1849–1926), had also been a painter. Antoine de Margerie felt drawn to the vocation, causing his parents worry. In order to reassure them, de Margerie takes up medical studies, as well as pursuing a humanities degree and taking courses at the École du Louvre and the Institut d'Art et d'Archéologie at the Sorbonne. In 1964 he made the difficult decision to take up painting exclusively. In 1964 he married Anne Guillet, whom he met at the École du Louvre, and they subsequently have two daughters, Constance and Isabelle. They lived in Paris until 1991, when he buys a house in Sandihac in the Gard and spends half the year there. He died in Paris in 2005.

== Geometric Abstraction ==
Antoine de Margerie started painting in his childhood. At 12, he handled his brushwork with skill. Initially figurative, this figuration quickly becomes stylised with carefully delineated contours and bold colours. Increasingly exuberant, his manner became freer, almost joyful. In his thirties, de Margorie shifted to abstraction, an inspired geometry (as with Mondrian or Malevitch) replacing his youthful lyricism. The painted curve becomes progressively more absent from his design, to be replaced by the signal language of constructivism. Controlled and planned, the work is a cerebral exercise. The impulsive impetus all but disappears, to be replaced by a 'rigorous obstinacy' that nevertheless reveals a highly motivated artist.

== Work and its reception ==
- According to Antoine de Margerie:

'Pastels, watercolours, paintings or engravings, the same applies: constructed elements, a limited range of motifs and not more than one per canvas! Like others I began figuratively, but in my landscapes it was the edge of fields and the horizon that attracted me. In still life, it was the table rather than what was on it and in interiors, doors, walls and cupboards. It's probably how I slipped into abstraction. One area of research in painting led to another, and so on.'

- According to Jacques Bouzerand:

' The spirit dominates matter in de Margerie's painting. The brain masters impulses from the heart and the body. Reflecting on and analysing space precedes any gesture of the paintbrush, which remains discreet because it is but a servant of the painted. In the 'battle of line and colour' as theorised by Yves Klein, de Margerie has not gone just for colour, he has accepted rule by the line.

- According to Anne Tronche, the artist's biographer:

'Everything concurs towards a slow but supple rhythm, as if by the use of abstraction. the treatment undergone by the painting is that of a living organism with its own logic. The artist imagines subtle monochromes, or perhaps breaks up a monochrome tendency with the disequilibrium created by a striking colour contrast.

- According to Guy Lanoe, President of the Salon des Réalités Nouvelles from 1995 to 2004:

'Painter and engraver, de Margerie starts with a spatial geometry using long lines or curves. These delimit flat planes, where blacks and greys dominate, zones of silence where emotion seems absent. This is the result of a constant emptying out, revisited time and again, an anxious and unremitting questioning. But this rigour and precision does not result in those all too perfect prescriptions which freeze discourse. In the middle of muted tones, reds, blues and oranges make their appearance and thereby announce the blossoming of colour'.

- According to Jacques Tournier, writer:

'I discover a conscious, carefully directed work which continues without fail to the last, luminous canvases. What strikes me most, if I flip rapidly through the book, is how the coloured line evolves (most evidently in the last pages) towards a luminous red, before slowly darkening to sombre, black canvases; then lightening again to transparent, almost secretive whites in all their splendour'.

== Salon des Réalités Nouvelles ==
In 1972, de Margerie joined the committee of the Salon des Réalités Nouvelles. In the nineties he became a member of the administration, occupying the post of treasurer. Declining the post of president in succession to Jacques Busse, he retained his treasurer's position. Antoine de Margerie's work appeared in 25 solo exhibitions and many group shows such as the Venice Biennale, the Salon de Mai and the Salons Comparisons. His work is in public and private collections in France and internationally.

== Selected individual exhibitions ==
- 1964: Galerie du Quai aux fleurs (Paris)
- 1967: Galerie Zuniini (Paris)
- 1969: Musée de Nantes (France)
- 1971: Galerie Le Soleil dans la tête (Paris)
- 1992 Galerie La Hune-Brenner (Paris)
- 2010 Galerie Gimpel & Müller (Paris) (www.gimpel-muller.com)
- 2010 Galerie Olivier Nouvellet, Paris
- 2013 Light Years, alerie Gimpel et Müller, Paris
- 2015 Sensitive horizons, musée Estrine, Saint-Rémy-de-Provence

== Public collections ==
- Musée national d'art moderne, Centre Georges Pompidou, Paris
- Musée d'art moderne de la Ville de Paris
- Bibliothèque nationale de France, cabinet des estampes, Paris
- Musée de Saint-Omer, France
- Maisons de la culture: Le Havre; Grenoble; Dunkerque..., France
- Satoru Sato Art Museum, Tomé, Japan.

== Bibliography ==
- Cahier VII, Centre Gildas-Fardel, Musée de Nantes, France, 1970.
- Jean-Clarence Lambert : " Chromos " Amsterdam, Netherland, 1972
- Gilles Plazy : "L'angle et la courbe" Le Quotidien de Paris, France, March 1977
- Biennale de Venise, Pavillon de la France, Catalogue, éditions Jacques Damase, France 1980
- Gérald Gassiot-Talabot : "Margerie", Opus International, France, 1980.
- Annick Pély-Audan : "Margerie, vivre lla peinture, vivre l'ascèse" Paris, 1987
- Salon des Réalités Nouvelles, Guy Lano¨: "Antoine de Margerie ", Catalogue, Paris, 2005
- "Antoine de Margerie; peintures et gravures " par Anne Tronche, Éditions du Regard, Paris, 2010.
