= William Wegman =

William Wegman may refer to:

- Bill Wegman (William Edward Wegman, born 1962), American baseball player
- William Wegman (photographer) (born 1943), American artist
