= Moira Dryer =

Canadian artist

- Moira Dryer (NYC 1989) photo by Jeannette Montgomery Barron
- Born: 1957; Toronto, Canada
- Died: May 20, 1992; New York City, U.S.
- Education: School of Visual Arts
- Known for: Painter

Moira Dryer (1957–1992) was a Canadian artist known for her abstract paintings on wood panels that bridged the gap between Conceptual Art and contemporary painting with a playful and poetic approach.

Dryer was born the youngest of three children in Toronto, Canada. Her mother, Pegeen Synge, was an architect and her father, Douglas Dryer. was a professor of philosophy at the University of Toronto. Dryer attended Sir George Williams University in Montreal before moving to New York City to attend the School of Visual Arts (SVA) in Manhattan. At SVA she was a student of the painter Elizabeth Murray in 1978 and 1980 and became a friends and a studio assistant to Murray. She also became a studio assistant to the Neo-expressionist painter Julian Schnabel. Dryer graduated from SVA with honors in 1981.

Before working full time as painter, Dryer was a freelance prop and scenic design maker, and set designer for the avant-garde theater company Mabou Mines.

In 1982, Dryer married fellow painter and SVA classmate Victor Alzamora. Alzamora died of a congenital heart condition in 1983 at the age of 29.

Moira Dryer died of cancer at her home in New York City on May 20, 1992.

== Exhibitions ==
Dryer had her first solo exhibition in 1986 at the John Good Gallery. Subsequent exhibitions include shows at Mary Boone Gallery in Manhattan; Fred Hoffman Gallery in Santa Monica, California; Mario Diacono Gallery in Boston; Jay Gorney Modern Art in Manhattan; Eleven Rivington in Manhattan and Magenta Plains in Manhattan.

During her lifetime, Dryer had one-person exhibitions at the Institute of Contemporary Art, Boston (1987) and at the San Francisco Museum of Modern Art. She was the focus of a Museum of Modern Art Focus exhibition curated by former Senior Curator of Painting and Sculpture Robert Storr.

=== Solo and two-person exhibitions ===
2025
Moira Dryer: Perpetual Painting, Magenta Plains, New York

2014
Moira Dryer Project, Eleven Rivington, New York

2000
Moira Dryer, curated by Gregory Salzman; Forum for Contemporary Art, St. Louis (8 Sept.-4 Nov., 2000); Art Gallery of York University, Toronto (29 Nov.-4 Feb., 2001); Rose Art Museum, Brandeis University, Waltham, MA (29 March- 20 May 2001); The Contemporary Museum, Baltimore (17 June- 26 August 2001)

1998
Moira Dryer & Shirley Wiitasalo, Greene Natfali Gallery, New York

1997
The Point of Departure: Moira Dryer / Jessica Stockholder; Gallery of Art, Johnson County Community College, Overland Park, KS

Gallery 400, University of Illinois Chicago

1995
Estate Paintings; Jay Gorney Modern Art, New York

1993
Estate Paintings; Jay Gorney Modern Art, New York
Projects 42: Moira Dryer; The Museum of Modern Art, New York

1992
Mary Boone Gallery, New York

1991
Fred Hoffman Gallery, New York
Mario Diacono Gallery, Boston

1990
Mario Diacono Gallery, Boston
Mary Boone Gallery, New York

1989
New Work: Moira Dryer, San Francisco Museum of Modern Art, San Francisco

1988
John Good Gallery, New York

1987
Hoffman Borman Gallery, Santa Monica, CA
Institute of Contemporary Art, Boston

1986
John Good Gallery, New York

=== Group exhibitions ===
2017 Fast Forward: Painting from the 1980s, Whitney Museum of American Art, New York, Jan 27-May 14, 2017

2013
Four Women and a Kosuth, James Barron Art, New York, September 13–22, 2013
I, You, We, Whitney Museum of American Art, New York, April 25–September 1, 2013

2011
The Indiscipline of Painting Tate St. Ives, Cornwall, touring to Warwick Art Centre (2011/12)
Circa 1986, The Hudson Valley Center for Contemporary Art, Peekskill, New York
A Painting Show, Harris Lieberman, New York

2008
Charismatic Abstraction, James W. and Lois I. Richmond Center for Visual Arts, Western Michigan University, Kalamazoo, Michigan, October 30–November 25, 2008

2007
Two Years, Whitney Museum of American Art, New York, October 17, 2007 – February 17, 2008

2006
Women's Work: Paintings 1970–1990, Greenberg Van Doren, New York
Hunters & Gatherers: The Art of Collecting, The Shore Institute of the Contemporary Arts (SICA), Asbury Park, New Jersey

2005
The Painted World, MoMA PS1, New York

2001
As Painting: Division and Displacement, curated by Philip Armstrong, Laura Lisbon and Stephen Melville; Wexner Center for the Arts, Columbus, Ohio
Side Show, curated by Augusto Arbizo; Lawrence Rubin-Greenberg Van Doren-Fine Art, New York

2000
D, Sandra Gering Gallery, New York, curated by Robert Nickas

1999
The Stroke: An Overview of Contemporary Painting, curated by Ross Bleckner, Exit Art, New York

1998
Jay Gorney Modern Art, New York

1997
Coming Home Again, curated by Jeanne Siegel for the 50th Anniversary of the School of Visual Arts; Newhouse Center for Contemporary Art, Snug Harbor Cultural Center, Staten Island, NY
After the Fall: Aspects of Abstract Painting since 1970, curated by Lily Wei; Visual Arts Gallery, New York

1996
Some Recent Acquisitions, Museum of Modern Art, New York
Playpen & Corpus Delirium, Kunsthalle Zürich, Zürich
Reconditioned Abstraction, curated by Martin Ball; Forum for Contemporary Art, St, Louis
Painting In An Expanding Field, organized by Saul Ostrow; Usdan Gallery, Bennington College, Bennington, Vermont
Natural Process, Center Gallery, Bucknell University, Lewisberg, PA; Williams Center for the Arts, Lafayette College, Easton, Pennsylvania

1995
Pittura-mmedia, Neue Galerie am Landesmuseum Joanneum, Graz, Austria
A Selected Survey, 1983-1995, Pat Hearn Gallery, New York

1994
New York Abstract Painting, Salvatore Ala Gallery, New York

1993
Italia – America: L’astrazione ridefinita, Galeria Nazionale d’Arte Moderna, San Marino

1992
Abstract Painting 1992; Schmidt Contemporary Art, St. Louis

1991
Moira Dryer, Roni Horn, Sherrie Levine, Hiram Butler Gallery, Houston

1990
Gallery Group Exhibition, Lawrence Oliver Gallery, Philadelphia

1989
A Decade of American Drawing: 1980-89, Daniel Weinberg Gallery, Santa Monica

1988
Lawrence Oliver Gallery, Philadelphia
The Other Painting, Royal Canadian Academy of Arts Gallery, Toronto
The Image of Abstraction The Museum of Contemporary Art, Los Angeles
Tom Cugliani Gallery, New York
In Side, Barbara Kraków Gallery, Boston
School of Visual Arts Alumni Exhibition, Leo Castelli Gallery, New York
Pat Hearn Gallery, New York
Ironic Abstraction, University of South Florida Art Galleries, Tampa

1987
Stimulation, John Good Gallery, New York
Grand Design, Proctor Art Center, Bard College, Annandale-on Hudson, NY
True Pictures, New York Studio School, New York
Jennifer Bolande, Moira Dryer, Annette Lemieux, Lawrence Oliver Gallery, Philadelphia

1986
Selections, Artists Space, New York
Paintings/Objects, Postmasters Gallery, New York
Recent Abstract Painting, John Good Gallery, New York
Cash/Newhouse Gallery, New York

1985
New American Abstraction, John Good Gallery, New York

1984
New York, New Work, New Museum of Contemporary Art, New York

1983
Limbo Lounge, New York

1982
Visionary Landscape, P.S. 122, New York
YYZ Gallery, Toronto
White Room, White Columns, New York

1981
Visual Arts Gallery, New York

1980
Proposal Gallery, Baltimore
Group Material, New York

=== Public collections ===
- Albright-Knox Art Gallery, Buffalo, NY
- Art Gallery of Ontario, Toronto
- Birmingham Museum of Art, Birmingham, Alabama
- Carnegie Museum of Art, Pittsburgh
- Solomon R. Guggenheim Museum, New York
- High Museum of Art, Atlanta ('Picture This', 1989)
- Hirshhorn Museum and Sculpture Garden, Washington, DC
- Maramotti Collection, Reggio Emilia, Italy
- Museum of Contemporary Art, Los Angeles
- Museum of Modern Art, New York
- The Newark Museum of Art, Newark, New Jersey
- Whitney Museum of American Art, New York
