= Keith Tyson =

English artist (born 1969)

- Born: Keith Thomas Bower; 23 August 1969 (age 57); Ulverston, Lancashire, England
- Known for: Painting, drawing, installation art
- Spouse(s): Xenia Dieroff (divorced) Elisabeth Murdoch (m. 2017)
- Children: 3
- Awards: Turner Prize, 2002

Keith Tyson (born Keith Thomas Bower, 23 August 1969) is an English artist. In 2002, he was the winner of the Turner Prize. Tyson works in a wide range of media, including painting, drawing and installation. His artistic philosophy rejects the notion of a fixed self or a singular artistic style.

== Early life ==
Bower moved to Dalton-in-Furness when he was four, adopting his stepfather's surname Tyson. He showed an interest in and talent for art at an early age, having been inspired by his "very creative and enthusiastic" primary school art teacher.

In 1989, he began an art foundation course at the Carlisle College of Art, and the following year he moved south to take up a place on experimental Alternative Practice degree at The Faculty of Arts and Architecture, University of Brighton (1990–93).

== Career ==
During the 1990s, Tyson's practice was dominated by the Artmachine, through which Tyson explored his ongoing interest in randomness, causality, and the question of how things come into being. The Artmachine was a method Tyson developed which used a combination of computer programmes, flow charts and books in order to generate chance combinations of words and ideas, which were then realised in practice as artworks in a wide range of media.

The results of the Artmachine became the basis of Tyson's earliest exhibited artworks; The Artmachine Iterations; by 1999 he had mounted solo exhibitions in London, New York, Paris and Zürich, as well as contributed to group shows throughout Europe, North America and Australia.

From 1999, Tyson's interests practice turned from the Artmachine towards an artistic approach which explored the same thematic terrain, but this time directly by his own hand. The first such body of work was entitled Drawing and Thinking. Many of these works were installed in the international exhibition in the 2001 Venice Biennale

In 2002, Tyson mounted Supercollider at South London Gallery and then the Kunsthalle Zürich in Switzerland. The name of the exhibition, derived from the popular name for the CERN particle accelerator in Geneva, indicated the significance of scientific ways of seeing and thinking about the world to Tyson's art at this time.

In December 2002, Tyson was awarded the British visual arts award, the Turner Prize.

Keith Tyson's, Large Field Array, 2006, PaceWildenstein Gallery, New York

In 2005, Tyson first exhibited his most monumental and ambitious work to date, Large Field Array, in the Louisiana Museum of Modern Art in Denmark, which then travelled to the De Pont Museum of Contemporary Art in the Netherlands and The Pace Gallery in New York. In 2009, Tyson's work was shown at the Hayward Gallery as part of the group exhibition "Walking in My Mind".

== Artworks ==
=== The Artmachine Iterations ===
Only a fraction of the instructions issued from the Artmachine were realised as artworks (the Artmachine generated around 12,000 proposals which are still unmade), but the mixed media works that were created include a twenty-four foot painting made from bathroom sealant, and a painting using toothpaste and music CDs.

=== Large Field Array ===
Described by Walter Robinson as "nothing less than a complete Pop cosmology",Large Field Array comprises 300 modular units, most formed from into implied 2-foot cubes; the cubes are arranged into a grid occupying both the floor and walls of a gallery when installed. Each cubic sculpture represents a feature of the world, from popular culture to natural history.

=== The Nature Paintings (2005–2008) ===
A mixture of paints, pigments and chemicals are allowed to interact in specific ways upon an acid primed aluminium panel. The combined processes of gravity, chemical reaction, temperature, hydrophobia and evaporation simultaneously conspire to create surfaces reminiscent of a wide range of natural forms and landscapes. In this respect, the paintings seem to depict nature, but they are also created by nature as well.

=== Studio Wall Drawings (1997–present) ===
Collectively these works on paper represent Tyson’s sketchbook or journal. Each "Wall Drawing" is made on a sheet of paper measuring 158 cm x 126 cm, the same dimensions as a small wall in Tyson's original studio where he used to draw-up notes. They are often exhibited in large non-chronological grids to form solid walls of diverse images, and text.

== Works ==
Solo Exhibitions

- (2026) Keith Tyson. The Generative Universe, Hauser & Wirth, Los Angeles
- (2025) Keith Tyson. Universal Symphony, Serlachius, Mänttä, Finland
- (2022) Keith Tyson. Drawings & Paintings, Hauser & Wirth, New York NY
- (2019) Musée Marmottan Monet, Paris, France
- (2018) Keith Tyson. BIG DATA (PAINTINGS 2012 – 2018), Hauser & Wirth, Zurich, Switzerland
- (2017) Large Field Array, Zabludowicz Collection, Sarvisalo, Finland (Travelling Exhibition)
- (2017) Les Fleurs, Galerie Georges-Philippe & Nathalie Vallois, Paris, France
- (2017) Turn Back Now, Jerwood Gallery, Hastings, UK
- (2014) A Mystery to Myself, David Risley Gallery, Copenhagen, Denmark
- (2013) Panta Rhei. Recent Painting by Keith Tyson, Pace Gallery, London, UK
- (2011) Entangled in the Amber Glow of a Weary Woven World, David Risley Gallery, Copenhagen, Denmark
- (2011) Keith Tyson. Contemporary Grotesques, Galerie Georges-Philippe & Nathalie Vallois, Paris, France
- (2010) Keith Tyson. 52 Variables, Pace Gallery, New York NY

Group Exhibitions

- (2025) From Amber to the Stars. Together with M.K. Ciurlionis. Now and Then, M.K. Ciurlionis National Museum of Art, Kaunas, Lithuania
- (2023) Topologies of the Real: Techne Shenzhen 2022 (Beijing Triennial), Shenzhen Museum of Contemporary Art and Urban Planning, Shenzhen, Guangdong, China
- (2019) So British! Collection Pinault, Musée des Beaux-Arts de Rouen, Rouen, France
- (2019) Expect the Unexpected, The Lowry, Salford, UK
- (2018) Entangle / Physics and the Artistic Imagination, Bildmuseet, Umeå, Sweden
- (2018) Principia Mathematica, Pace Gallery, New York NY
- (2018) Wunderkammer 1. Liquid Form, Esbjerg Art Museum, Esbjerg, Denmark
- (2016) Ex Situ. Samples of Lifeforms, Copenhagen Contemporary, Denmark
- (2016) Talking on Paper, Pace Gallery, Beijing, China
- (2016) Press Art. Die Sammlung Annette und Peter Nobel Vol. II, MASILugano Museo d'arte dellla Svizzera italiana, Lugano, Switzerland
- (2015) Zabludowicz Collection. 20 Years, Zabludowicz Collection, London, UK
- (2015) Collected by Thea Westreigh Wagner and Ethan Wagner, Whitney Museum of American Art, New York NY (Travelling Exhibition)
- (2015) Collected by Thea Westreigh Wagner and Ethan Wagner, Centre Pompidou, Paris, France (Travelling Exhibition)
- (2015) Collecting Lines. Drawings from the Ringier Collection, Chapter I, Villa Flora, Winterthur, Switzerland
- (2015) De Pictura. Keith Tyson & Hugo Wilson. A Dialogue About Painting, Project B Gallery, Milan, Italy
- (2015) Chewing Gum, Pace Gallery, Hong Kong
- (2015) Eureka, Pace Gallery, New York NY
- (2014) In the Round, Pace Gallery, New York NY

Monographs

- Mengham, Rod; Sivonen, Pauli; Valjakka, Timo (eds.), "Keith Tyson. Universal Symphony", Helsinki: Parvs Publishing, 2025, ill. (exh. cat.)
- Archer, Michael; Koek, Ariane; Rappolt, Mark (eds.), "Keith Tyson. Iterations & Variations", London: Thames & Hudson, 2022, ill.
- Mathieu, Marianne; Massot, Soline (eds.), "Dialogues Inattendus au Musée Marmottan Monet. Keith Tyson", Paris: Musée Marmottan Monet, 2019, ill. (exh. cat.)
- Galerie Georges‑Philippe & Nathalie Vallois (ed.), "Keith Tyson – Les Fleurs", Paris: Galerie Georges‑Philippe & Nathalie Vallois, 2017, ill. (exh. cat.)
- Neilson, Elizabeth (ed.), "Zabludowicz Collection: Keith Tyson, Large Field Array", London: Zabludowicz Collection, 2016, ill. (exh. cat.)
- Ruf, Beatrix, "Panta Rhei: Keith Tyson", London: Pace Gallery, 2013, ill. (exh. cat.)
- Pace Gallery (ed.), "Keith Tyson: 52 Variables", New York: Pace Gallery, 2010, ill. (exh. cat.)
- Cloud Choreography and Other Emergent Systems, Parasol Unit foundation for contemporary art, London, 2009
- Glimcher, Marc, "Keith Tyson. Fractal Dice", New York: Pace Wildenstein, 2008, ill. (exh. cat.)
- Venables, Fiona, "Keith Tyson: Nature Paintings", Carlisle: Tullie House Museum & Art Gallery, 2008, ill. (exh. cat.)
- Martian Museum of Terrestrial Art, Barbican Art Gallery, London, 2008
- Keith Tyson, Studio Wall Drawings 1997–2007, Haunch of Venison, London, 2007
- Keith Tyson, Large Field Array, Louisiana Museum, Denmark, 2006
- How to Improve the World: 60 Years of British Art, Hayward Gallery, London, 2006
- Keith Tyson, Geno Pheno, PaceWildenstein, New York/Haunch of Venison, London, 2005
- Keith Tyson, History Paintings, 2005
- Dionysiac, Centre Pompidou, Paris, 2005
- Head to Hand, Drawings by Keith Tyson, Thea Westreich & Ethan Wagner, New York, 2002
- Keith Tyson, Kunsthalle Zürich, Switzerland, 2002
- Supercollider, South London Gallery, London, 2002
- Turner Prize Exhibition, Tate Britain, London, 2002
- Public Affairs, Kunsthaus Zürich, Switzerland, 2002
- Century City: Art and Culture in the Modern Metropolis, Tate Modern, London, 2000
- Over the Edges, SMAK-Stedelijk Museum voor Actuele Kunst, Gent, 2000
- Dream Machines, Hayward Gallery, London, 2000

Publications and Media

- 'The Decision was Elsewhere',Quiet Modernism,, June 2026
- Michael Peel, 'Artist Keith Tyson on why he's funding Oxford's 400-year-old astronomy professorship', Financial Times, May 2026
- Front Row, BBC Radio 4, May 2026
- Liz Calderon, 'The Generative Universe: Keith Tyson returns to LA with new exhibition at Hauser & Wirth LA Downtown News May 2026
- Mark Rappolt, 'Life, the Universe and Everything', Art Review, February 2007
- Rachel Withers, ‘Keith Tyson’, Artforum, March 2005
- Marcus Verhagen, 'Keith Tyson', Art Monthly, December 2004 - January 2005
- Michael Archer, 'Primordial Soups', Parkett 71, 2004
- Ethan Wagner and Keith Tyson, 'A Conversation', Parkett 71, 2004
- Hans Rudolph Reust, 'Fabulous Art', Parkett 71, 2004
- Tony Barrell, ‘Rising to the Equation’, Sunday Times Magazine, 30 November 2003 Latest news & breaking headlines
- Virginia Button, The Turner Prize: Twenty Years, Tate Publishing, 2003
- Matthew Collings, Art Crazy Nation: The Post Blimey Art World, 21 Publishing Ltd, 2001
- Louisa Buck, Moving Targets 2, A Users Guide to British Art Now, Tate Publishing, London, 2000
