= Mary Boone =

American art dealer and collector

- Born: c. 1951 or 1952 (age 74–75); Erie, Pennsylvania, U.S.
- Education: Rhode Island School of Design; Hunter College
- Occupations: Art dealer, collector
- Years active: 1977–present
- Children: 1

Mary Boone (born 1952) is an American art dealer and collector. As the owner and director of the Mary Boone Gallery, she played an important role in the New York art market of the 1980s. Her first two artists, Julian Schnabel and David Salle, became internationally known, and, in 1982, she was featured in a cover story on New York magazine tagged: "The New Queen of the Art Scene". Boone is credited with championing and fostering dozens of contemporary artists including Eric Fischl, Ai Weiwei, Barbara Kruger, Laurie Simmons, Peter Halley, Ross Bleckner, and Jean-Michel Basquiat. Originally based in SoHo, Boone operated two galleries, one on Fifth Avenue, the other in Chelsea. Following her 2019 conviction for tax evasion, she indicated the intention to close both galleries.

== Early life and education ==
Boone moved to New York City at the age of 19 from Erie, Pennsylvania. Her parents were working class Egyptian immigrants. She studied art history at Rhode Island School of Design and received her BFA in sculpture in 1973. Boone met sculptor Lynda Benglis at Hunter College and the artist introduced her to the director of Bykert Gallery, Klaus Kertess, where she would eventually work.

== Career ==
In 1977, Boone opened the Mary Boone Gallery in SoHo, New York City. The gallery quickly rose to prominence by exhibiting new painters associated with neo-expressionism such as Eric Fischl, Julian Schnabel, and David Salle. Boone's gallery and presence throughout the 1980s offered a departure from conceptual and minimal approaches to art by supporting a revival in painting. In 1982, Boone was named "The New Queen of the Art Scene" by New York magazine. A New York Times critic later described her gallery's 1979 exhibition of Julian Schnabel's work as perhaps being "the key launching pad" for neo-expressionism.

The Swiss art dealer and collector Bruno Bischofberger joined Boone's gallery in 1984 and partnered with the gallery to mount early shows featuring the painter Jean Michel Basquiat. The two galleries shared a selection of artists, with Boone successfully bringing a neo-expressionist movement to Europe and Bischofberger situating the American painters alongside the post-war painters like Anselm Kiefer and Georg Baselitz. In 1988, Barbara Kruger became the first woman to join the gallery.

Mary Boone was one of the most successful gallerists of her generation and became "the dealer who epitomized the speculative '80s art world." She was the first dealer to require waiting lists for collectors to buy works that had not yet been produced, though some collectors were granted "first refusal". When the art market crashed in 1990, she was condemned for her role in the over-heated market of the previous decade. Boone was accused of over-hyping her artists or pushing them to release inferior works to fulfill market demand. In a later interview with W magazine, Boone explained without any prompting, "I think I lost my way. It was the Eighties. I got too involved with fame and fortune."

In 1996, the Mary Boone Gallery left SoHo and opened a midtown gallery on Fifth Avenue. She opened a second gallery in the Chelsea art district in 2000 while adding a younger generation of artists that included Will Cotton, Tom Sachs, and Inka Essenhigh. Both galleries were closed in 2019.

In 2025, Boone curated an exhibition with Dominique Levy featuring many artists of her 1980's roster. Responding to the question of where things were headed next, she told Artnet that, “at 73, I don’t really plan ahead in the same way that I did when I was young. I just wanna do what’s fun for me.”

== Artists ==
Artists who have been represented or shown by the Mary Boone Gallery include:

- Ai Weiwei
- Judith Barry
- Georg Baselitz
- Jean-Michel Basquiat
- Ericka Beckman
- Ross Bleckner
- Francesco Clemente
- Will Cotton
- Moira Dryer
- Inka Essenhigh
- Eric Fischl
- Hilary Harkness
- Kaws
- Anselm Kiefer
- Barbara Kruger
- Roy Lichtenstein
- Damian Loeb
- Liu Xiaodong
- Brice Marden
- Agnes Martin
- Allan McCollum
- Matt Mullican
- Yoko Ono
- Sigmar Polke
- Tom Sachs
- David Salle
- Peter Saul
- Julian Schnabel
- Laurie Simmons

== Personal life ==
In September 2018, Boone pleaded guilty to filing false income tax returns and "agreed to pay more than $3 million in restitution for taxes she owes for 2009, 2010, and 2011." During the trial proceedings, collectors, dealers, artists Wendy White and Sheila Pepe, and art critic Jerry Saltz gave testimony to Boone's character and her lifelong dedication to the art establishment. "Mary's been a target forEVER," Pepe tweeted, "Like all the boys aren't cooking the books." On February 14, 2019, Boone was sentenced to 30 months in federal prison. In a statement to ArtNews, Boone said "If I'm going to be the Martha Stewart of the art world, I would hope to do it with the same humility, humor, grace and intelligence that she did. I'm trying to be optimistic and see this as a learning experience." She was released from prison in 2020.

Boone married fellow art dealer Michael Werner in 1986, with whom she has one son. The couple divorced in the 1990s and remained close friends.

== Representation in film and popular media ==
Boone was portrayed by Parker Posey in Julian Schnabel's 1996 biographical drama Basquiat, accompanied by Dennis Hopper as Bischofberger.

On March 28, 2024, Vampire Weekend released a single titled "Mary Boone" from their album Only God Was Above Us. An alternate video for the single features footage of Boone from a 1986 documentary.
