= Jason Yates =

American artist

- Born: 1972 (age 53–54); Detroit, Michigan
- Education: University of Michigan
- Known for: Painting, sculpture, installation

Jason Yates (born 1972 in Detroit, Michigan) is a contemporary artist who lives and works in Los Angeles, California.

== Education ==
Yates got his BFA from the University of Michigan in 1995 and his MFA from Art Center College of Design, Pasadena, CA in 2000.

== Early career / Fast Friends Inc. ==
Yates's early work in the late 1990s to the mid 2000s, was typified by a collaborative ethos and bridging the gap between various genres, namely art, music, fashion and design. Raised in Detroit and while still in his teens, Yates became a friend and collaborator with funk/jazz/ fusion musician George Clinton. Speaking about Clinton and the musician's influence on his own practice, Yates says "I always thought of Clinton not as a musician but as a total artist. As much as the art world endeavours to branch out, it's still very specialized. To Clinton, making art was part of his normal trajectory. He was an artist-musician. And I always saw art as being a component of a lot of different movements and incredibly dependent on a group dynamic." This way of thinking was a formative influence on his Yates' practice.

After moving to Los Angeles to study with Mike Kelley, Mayo Thompson and Liz Larner in the MFA program at Art Center, Yates formed 'Fast Friends Inc.' a collaborative project to disseminate art outside the conventional gallery system and to distribute the work on the artist's own terms. Chris Kraus writes in Where Art Belongs "Yates is an exceptional artist. For six years as Fast Friends he created band posters for Ariel Pink, (Matt) Fishbeck (of the band Holy Shit) and others that are also original art works. Any study of the confluence between music and visual culture in the last two decades would cite Yates' work".

The Fast Friends art works, which double as functional concert posters, are works on paper with mixed media and have been described as "each a colorful psychedelic explosion of creatures, captions, and hundreds of stickers" and "rough drawings and graphic riffs push to a visual density that quickly becomes a blur of coloured pencil and grotesque figuration. A central figure or head, ranging from fanciful creatures to Captain Beefheart, anchors the composition, and little droves of colour file out and disperse around the head, almost like oceans of saints around the godhead in Byzantine mosaics." In the work Shit Age (2007), "witchy pyramid triangles cut out of Mylar surrounded by rivers of watery brush strokes are infested with animal eyes, pot seeds and pills like buried in gobs of glittery glue...the deranged menagerie seemingly supported on a nest of hatched lines. Weed green rods of lightning burst out of the sky". Describing these works, Yates says they "were all infused with inside jokes, inside critiques, inside information". The "hatched lines" and Mylar, Kraus speaks of, will also reappear in Yates' more formal, pared down paintings. The Fast Friends inc. works were shown in the exhibition "Burnout, The Fast Friends Inc. Project, A Depiction of DYI Dandyism and Pop by Cult Hero Jason Yates" at Tiny Creatures gallery Los Angeles 2007 and at Circus Gallery, Los Angeles in 2009.

== Paintings, sculptures and installations ==
Yates' exhibitions are characterized by installations including paintings, sculptures, wall drawings, and hand etched mirrors. These installations have been called "not a collection of well installed objects, which it also is, but a total experience, a site-specific installation whose whole far outweighs the sum of its parts."

Yates' paintings are large scale single or two-panel works, some three-dimensional and free standing, and covered in a cross hatched motif with the canvas being cut away in regular patterns to create a cascading effect. In these works "Yates invites us to not only explore the surface, but like Lucio Fontana, he lets you look behind the normally unseen space behind the mark making." They have been described by Los Angeles Times critic Christopher Knight as starting "with clusters of parallel strokes reminiscent of Jasper Johns' hatch paintings from the 70's...the canvas is cut in scores of scalloped shapes, curled away from the surface and held out from it by a rod glued inside" These flaps are backed with a flat color or metallic Mylar in silver or gold, as are the newly exposed surfaces underneath." The effect of the Mylar in the canvas "complicate the visual appeal, adding unexpected flashes of reflected internal light" as the viewer moves around the paintings. The cross hatched motif, at once obsessive and meditative, recurs throughout Yates' two dimensional works, appearing in hand etched mirrors, wall drawings, wallpaper and as mentioned above some of the Fast Friends Inc. works and "Yates’ incessant modular mark making affirms a zoned out, altered experience of time’s passing and an insistently manual reclamation of space as a place to get lost in"

Yates' sculptures called "Monk Boxes" are both aesthetic objects and functional ones. Typically made of black stained red maple, and pierced with holes in a regular sequence along the edges through which are wrapped with thick rope, the works have a simple, austere beauty and in these works and others "Yates shares with monastic orders a devotion to a toiling obsessiveness marked by blunt repetition."

For his show at anna meliksetian | MJBriggs gallery Every Self Portrait is a Cry for Help in 2012, Yates repurposed the forms of these sculptures to create an installation, a bedroom environment including a king size bed, vanities, and side tables. The sculptures were complemented by hand etched mirrors, paintings, artist designed wall paper and hand silkscreened sheets, all of which featured the artist's characteristic cross hatching patterns in various forms. The installation played with the context of the neighborhood, which has many furniture shops, as well as being a comment on the city itself, a decadent environment, a "place to die" as the artist has called it.

== Selected solo exhibitions ==
- 2013
  - "Ghost of an Ideal Life", anna meliksetian | MJBriggs, Los Angeles, CA.
- 2012
  - Every Self Portrait is a Cry for Help, anna melisketian | MJBriggs, Los Angeles, CA.
  - All We Ever Wanted Was Everything, Barbara Davis Gallery, Houston.
  - Master and Servant, Land of Tomorrow Gallery, Louisville, KY.
- 2009
  - The Rise and Fall of Shame, Circus Gallery, Hollywood, CA.
- 2007
  - Burn Out, Tiny Creatures, Los Angeles, CA.

== Two person exhibitions ==
- 2004
  - Cocaine Unicorn with Ariel Pink, Geffen Contemporary at MOCA, Los Angeles, CA.
- 1992
  - Grafilthists with George Clinton, Industry, Pontiac, MI.

== Projects and commissions (selected) ==
- Iconoclast Editions, Cincinnati, Ohio 2010
- Emma Grey HQ, Los Angeles, California 2010
- Penny Ante Editions, Los Angeles, California 2010
- The Arnott Family, Corona Del Mar, California 2010
- Los Angeles Contemporary Exhibitions, Hollywood, California 2009
- Ariel Pink's Haunted Graffiti, Los Angeles, California 2009
- Soundscreen Design, Brooklyn, New York 2009
- Glasslands Gallery, Brooklyn, New York 2008
- The Bley Family, Los Angeles, California 2008/10
- Narnack Records, Los Angeles, California 2008
- Christophe Lemaire, Paris, France 2008
- Merok, London, United Kingdom 2008
- Tiny Creatures, Los Angeles, California 2008
- Shadow Play, Asheville, North Carolina 2008
- Mushrooms International San Francisco, California 2008
- Sticky World, Chicago, Illinois 2008
- Welcome Hunters, Los Angeles, California 2008
- Insound Magazine, New York, New York 2008
- Human Ear, Los Angeles, California 2007
- Stephane Leonard, Berlin, Germany 2007
- Golden Boots / Park The Van Records, Tucson, Arizona 2007
