= Julien Berthier =

French artist

Julien Berthier (born 1975) is a French artist from Paris known, among other works and exhibitions, for his Love Love yacht, a fully seaworthy sailing yacht designed to look as if it is in the middle of sinking bow first - representing, according to the artist, 'lost hope and death'.
