= Pilar Albarracín =

Spanish artist

- Born: September 27, 1968 (age 58); Sevilla, España
- Education: University of Seville
- Known for: Performance art, installations, video and photography
- Movement: Contemporary Spanish Art
- Website: http://www.pilaralbarracin.com

Pilar Albarracín (born September 27, 1968 in Sevilla, Spain) is a contemporary Spanish artist. Albarracín is known for her performances, video, drawings, photography and interactive sculptural installations "that focus on the cultural construction of Spanish identity, especially that of the Andalusian woman." Curator Rosa Martinez considers Albarracín "one of the most significant artists of the contemporary Spanish scene." Writer Paula Achiaga names her one of the most controversial Spanish artists in a 2014 article.

== Biography ==
Albarracín was born in Sevilla, Spain. In 1993, she earned a Bachelor of Fine Arts from the University of Seville. After earning her bachelor's degree, Pilar moved to Ireland and steadily worked there for some time. When her work started becoming "more serious," she moved back to her home town to pursue an artistic career based on the social condition of the Andalusian identity. Pilar strived to create work based on the role of women, religious myths, and popular traditions. She earned her spot as a popular artist through her performance pieces where she has been able to transform herself into different female archetypes to portray her messages of feminism and empowerment. Since then, her career has become international and her work has been featured in the Macedonian Museum of Contemporary Art in Thessaloniki, Greece, as well as in the Contemporary Art Center of New York, the Centre National d'Art et du Paysage de Vassivière, and the Istanbul Modern Sanat Muzesi. Now she lives and works predominantly out of Madrid, Spain.

== Work and artistic philosophy ==
Albarracín's work examines her Andalusian culture and heritage, commenting on society and its symbols. She incorporates dance, such as Flamenco, and costuming in her performance. There is also an element of eroticism in her work. Albarracín is interested in gender and issues that are "linked to sociology." In addition, she is less interested in creating art for sale, but rather to create art which tells stories.

Much of Albarracín's work is about women or situations involving women. Her work often depicts women who have been hidden in plain view or who have become the victims of violence. Rosa Martínez writes that the women depicted by Albarracín "have all been used or abused by a system that considers them chattels, consumer goods." During her performances, she often transforms herself into archetypes of Spanish women, such as "peasant, as an immigrant, an abused woman, a housewife, a bailara (dancer flamenco) and even in cantaora (flamenco singer). Putting into play this personal energy, she is deeply involved in her characters: 'it's like being a medium that goes into each character to leave right away and go besiege the following'".

In a different mode, Albarracín also uses women's clothing to make her statements. Albarracín's 1999 performance, Spanish Omelette (Tortilla a la española) has her cutting up her own dress and cooking it in a "ceremony of self-immolation." In 2012, Albarracín created "underwear mandalas" from underwear and intimate wear originally owned by relatives of the artist. The series was called The Origin of the New World. When speaking about her mandalas, Albarracín commented how the intersection of the invisible, mundane underwear and the sacred nature of the mandala created a sense of irony. It also sparked conversation: Albarracín's requests for underwear from her relatives and friends caused them to open up and talk about themselves and their relationships with their own clothing and their bodies.

Although much of her work deals with serious issues, Albarracín populates her artistic vision so that it is "full of parodies and tragi-comedies that verge on cathartic paryoxysm." One such piece is The Goat (La cabra), 2001, where she depicts a sort of "savage dance" with a spilling wineskin.

While Albarracín looks at Andalusian symbols like those surrounding Flamenco and traditional Andalusian folklore with irony and humor, she also supports some of the traditions she often turns upside-down. For example, Albarracín is very supportive of bullfighting in Spain because it, like Flamenco dance, provides jobs and helps the economy by supporting tourism to Spain. She says that when her friends come to visit, they all want to see the bulls and hear Flamenco.

== Exhibition ==
One of her earliest work is from a group exhibition called "100%" in 1993. It was in the Museum of Contemporary Art in Seville, Spain. It was curated by Mar Villaespesa. "100%" was seen as the first collaboration in Spain entirely focused on Feminism. In May 2002, she was in the group exhibition "Argent et valeur – le dernier tabou" curated by Harald Szeemann at Expo. 02. Banque Nationale Suisse in Switzerland. This exhibition took place in the pavilion of The Swiss National Bank. The focus of the exhibition was to look at the value of money within different cultures and societies.

One of Albarracín's most recent exhibitions, consisting of traditional Flamenco performance art, was displayed in the Galerie Georges-Philippe et Nathalie Vallois in Paris, France (2017). Not long before that, she released pieces specifically addressing themes such as social inequalities, female identity, and violence. These emotional pieces were on display in the Centro De Arte Contemporaneo De Malaga in Malaga, Spain from June through September 2016.

In Pilar Albarracín's third solo exhibition she dives into her birthplace of Seville, Spain and traditional Spanish figures. Featured again in the Galerie Georges-Philippe at Nathalie Vallois, her work displayed in Paris from March through April 2015.

Albarracín's most notable and thought-provoking exhibitions, El Nuevo Mundo, displays mandalas created out of panties in a powerful way of showing the cultural construction of the Spanish woman. This exhibition took place between September 11 – November 12, 2014 in the Galeria Javier Lopez & Fer Frances. This exhibit was originally shown in the Galerie Georges-Philippe et Nathalie Vallois in Paris, France in 2012, where it started to gain popularity.

Albarracín's work is shown in the collections of the Musée d'Art Moderne de la Ville de Paris, the Artium Museum, the Contemporary Art Museum of Castilla y León, the Andalusian Contemporary Art Center, the Contemporary Art Center of Málaga, and also in many corporate collections. She was invited to show her work at the 2005 Venice Biennale, and the Moscow Biennale of Contemporary Art. Other important exhibitions of Albarracín's work have been shown at La Caixa (2002), the Reales Atarazanas in Sevilla (2004) and the Maison Rouge in Paris (2008).

== Publications ==
In 2003, Albarracín published Pilar Albarracín. The "Altadis Arts Plastics Award" chooses six Spanish or French artists without criteria of age or nationality. Albarracín was chosen to take part in the Mécénat Altadis series in 2002. In this body of work she focuses on the identity and status of women in Andalusian culture. She uses irony to give meaning to commonplace objects, like a casserole or mirror. Albarracín published Mortal Cadencia in 2008 in which she questions Spanish society, conventional gender roles and sexual identity through a multimedia exhibition. She utilizes video, performance, sculpture, photography, and installation. For example, she covered the ceiling in Flamenco skirts, showing the influence of andalusia on her art. Her book Recuerdos de España, translated to "Memories of Spain", was from an exhibition at Beijing, China in 2009. She uses the Chinese stereotypes of Spanish culture in a sarcastic and ironic way to reveal the problematic nature of tourism to turn Andalusian culture into "Spanish kitsch". Albarracín published Recuerdos de España in 2010 to catalog her exhibition at Tokyo, Japan.

== Galleries ==
Galeria Filomena Soares, Lisbon:

Founded in 1999, the Galeria Filomena Soares in Lisbon, Portugal is a space created to foster the production of contemporary art and artistic dialogue between all parties from artists and curators to larger organizations at an international scale.

Located in East Lisbon, the region has seen tremendous urban growth over the years, a turn from its industrial past. The gallery, at 1000 square meters, consists of two separate rooms for various sizes and purposes. They also produce exhibition monographs that are offered to the public through one of the reserved rooms. Galeria Filomena Soares aims to continue relationships between many different sides of the contemporary art industry. It frequently participates in fairs and shows.

Works:

Series Bordados en Guerra, 2017

- Size: 43 3/10 × 59 4/5 in
- https://www.artsy.net/artwork/pilar-albarracin-series-bordados-en-guerra

Untitled, 2018

- Size: 76 4/5 × 50 in
- Link: https://www.artsy.net/artwork/pilar-albarracin-untitled

Série 300 Mentiras, Mentira nº15 (3), 2009

- Size: 70 9/10 × 98 2/5 in
- Medium: Color Photograph
- Link: https://www.artsy.net/artwork/pilar-albarracin-serie-300-mentiras-mentira-no15-3

Série 300 Mentiras, Mentira º20, 2009

- Size: 74 4/5 × 49 1/5 in
- Medium: Color Photograph
- Link: https://www.artsy.net/artwork/pilar-albarracin-serie-300-mentiras-mentira-o20

Relicario, 2009

- Size: 47 1/5 × 31 1/2 in
- Medium: Color Photograph
- Link: https://www.artsy.net/artwork/pilar-albarracin-relicario

300 Lies Series, Lie nr. 22, 2009

- Size: 74 4/5 × 49 1/5 in
- Medium: Color Photograph
- Link: https://www.artsy.net/artwork/pilar-albarracin-300-lies-series-lie-nr-22

Untitled (Pájaros 2 ), 2007

- Size: 49 1/5 × 73 1/5 in
- Link: https://www.artsy.net/artwork/pilar-albarracin-untitled-pajaros-2

300 Lies Series, Lie nr.9, 2009

- Size: 74 4/5 × 49 1/5 in
- Medium: Black and White Print
- Link: https://www.artsy.net/artwork/pilar-albarracin-300-lies-series-lie-nr-dot-9

La pescadora de sueños:panes y peces, 2002

- Size: 53 1/2 × 53 1/2 in
- Medium: Color Photograph
- Link: https://www.artsy.net/artwork/pilar-albarracin-la-pescadora-de-suenos-panes-y-peces

300 Lies Series, Lie nr.5, 2009

- Size: 74 4/5 × 49 1/5 in
- Medium: Black and White Print
- Link: https://www.artsy.net/artwork/pilar-albarracin-300-lies-series-lie-nr-dot-5-1

== Notable works ==
La Noche 1002/ The Night 1002

- Color Photography; 125 x 186 cm

Lunares, 2004

- Video
- Galerie Valloise, Paris

Prohibido El Cante, 2013

- Black and White Photograph; 190 x 125 cm
