= Peter Stämpfli =

Swiss painter (1937–2026)

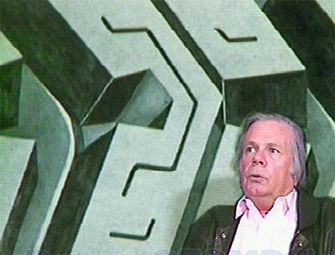
- Stämpfli in 1995
- Born: 3 July 1937; Deisswil bei Münchenbuchsee, Bern, Switzerland
- Died: 20 February 2026 (aged 88); Paris, France
- Occupation: Painter

Peter Stämpfli (3 July 1937 – 20 February 2026) was a Swiss painter associated with Pop art and especially known for his paintings, sculptures, and mixed media work of auto tires and tire treads.

== Life and career ==
Stämpfli was born in Deisswil, canton Bern, in 1937, Stämpfli was known in particular for his works with car tyres.

A student of Max von Mühlenen, he held numerous exhibitions at the Kunsthalle Basel and the Biennale de Paris until a fire destroyed his studio and much of his works in 1990. In 2011, he opened a foundation in Sitges, which houses a collection of his works along with those of other famous artists.

Stämpfli trained at the Biel School of Applied Arts and began exhibiting in galleries in the 1960s. He left Switzerland for France in 1959 and later lived in Switzerland several times.

Stämpfli died in Paris on 20 February 2026, at the age of 88.
