= Wendy White (artist) =

American artist

- Born: 1971
- Education: Mason Gross School of the Arts

Wendy White (born 1971) is an American artist from Deep River, Connecticut who lives and works in New York City.

== Biography ==
White studied fibers and was trained in fine art and textile design during her undergrad at Savannah College of Art & Design. She later studied painting at Mason Gross School of the Arts where she received her MFA.

== Education ==
Wendy White earned a BFA from Savannah College of Art & Design, Savannah, Georgia in 1993 and her MFA from Mason Gross School of the Arts at Rutgers University in 2003.

== Solo exhibitions ==
- 2019 Wendy White: Racetrack Playa, Shulamit Nazarian, Los Angeles, CA, USA
- 2018 Natural Light, Andrew Rafacz, Chicago, IL, USA
- 2018 American Idyll, SCAD Museum of Art, Savannah, GA, USA
- 2018 Rainbow Bridge, Kaikai Kiki, Tokyo, JP
- 2018 Loves, SCAD Atlanta, Atlanta, GA, USA
- 2018 Oil Slicks, David Castillo, Miami, FL, USA
- 2017 Kelly Girl, VAN HORN, Dusseldorf, DE
- 2016 Santa Cruz, Eric Firestone Gallery, New York, NY, USA
- 2015 Skiing, Galerie Jérôme Pauchant, Paris, FR
- 2015 Double Vanity, Sherrick & Paul, Nashville, TN, USA
- 2015 Wendy White:12th Man, David Castillo Gallery, Miami, FL, USA
- 2014 El Campo, VAN HORN, Düsseldorf, DE (catalog)
- 2013 Curva, M Building, Miami, FL, USA
- 2013 Pick Up a Knock, Andrew Rafacz, Chicago, IL (catalog)
- 2013 Sports Moment, Makebish, New York, NY
- 2013 Wendy White, Maruani and Noirhomme, Brussels, Belgium (catalog)
- 2012 Pix Vää, Leo Koenig, Inc., New York, NY
- 2012 En Asfalto, Galeria Moriarty, Madrid, Spain
- 2012 Radio Lampor, VAN HORN, Düsseldorf, Germany
- 2011 6 Years/6 Works, University of Tennessee, Chattanooga, TN
- 2010 French Cuts, Andrew Rafacz Gallery, Chicago, IL
- 2010 Up w/Briquette, Leo Koenig, Inc, New York, NY (catalog)
- 2009 Feel Rabid or Not, Galeria Moriarty, Madrid, Spain
- 2008 Autokennel, Leo Koenig, Inc, New York, NY
- 2006 Chunk Lite, Solomon Projects, Atlanta, GA
- 2006 Wendy White, Sixtyseven, New York, NY
- 2003 Silver Tongued, Solomon Projects, Atlanta, GA
- 2000 Spilled in Spaces, Solomon Projects, Atlanta, GA

== Group exhibitions ==
White's group exhibitions include Perez Art Museum, Miami, FL; Los Angeles County Museum of Art (LACMA), Los Angeles, CA; The Royal Swedish Academy of Fine Arts, Stockholm, Sweden; Sotheby's S|2, Harris Lieberman, Nicole Klagsbrun, Marlboro Contemporary, Fredericks & Freiser (all New York, NY); CCA Andratx, Mallorca, Spain; Library Street Collective, Detroit, MI; Bemis Center for Contemporary Arts, Omaha, Nebraska; CCA Andratx, Mallorca, Spain; Kunstverein Rosa-Luxemburg-Platz, Berlin, Germany; Shulamit Nazarian, Los Angeles, CA; Dio Horia Gallery, Mykonos, Greece; Motus Fort, Tokyo, Japan; The Museum of Modern Art, Gunma, Japan; The Museum of Fine Arts, Gifu, Japan; Aschenbach & Hofland, Amsterdam, NL; and Indianapolis Museum of Contemporary Art, Indianapolis, Indiana, USA.
