= List of 20th-century women artists =

This is a partial list of 20th-century women artists, sorted alphabetically by decade of birth. These artists are known for creating artworks that are primarily visual in nature, in traditional media such as painting, sculpture, photography, printmaking, ceramics as well as in more recently developed genres, such as installation art, performance art, conceptual art, digital art and video art.

The list covers artists born from 1870 through 1969. For earlier births, see List of 19th-century women artists. For later births see List of 21st-century women artists.

== 1870–1879 ==
Romaine Brooks, Miss Natalie Barney, "L'Amazone" (1920)

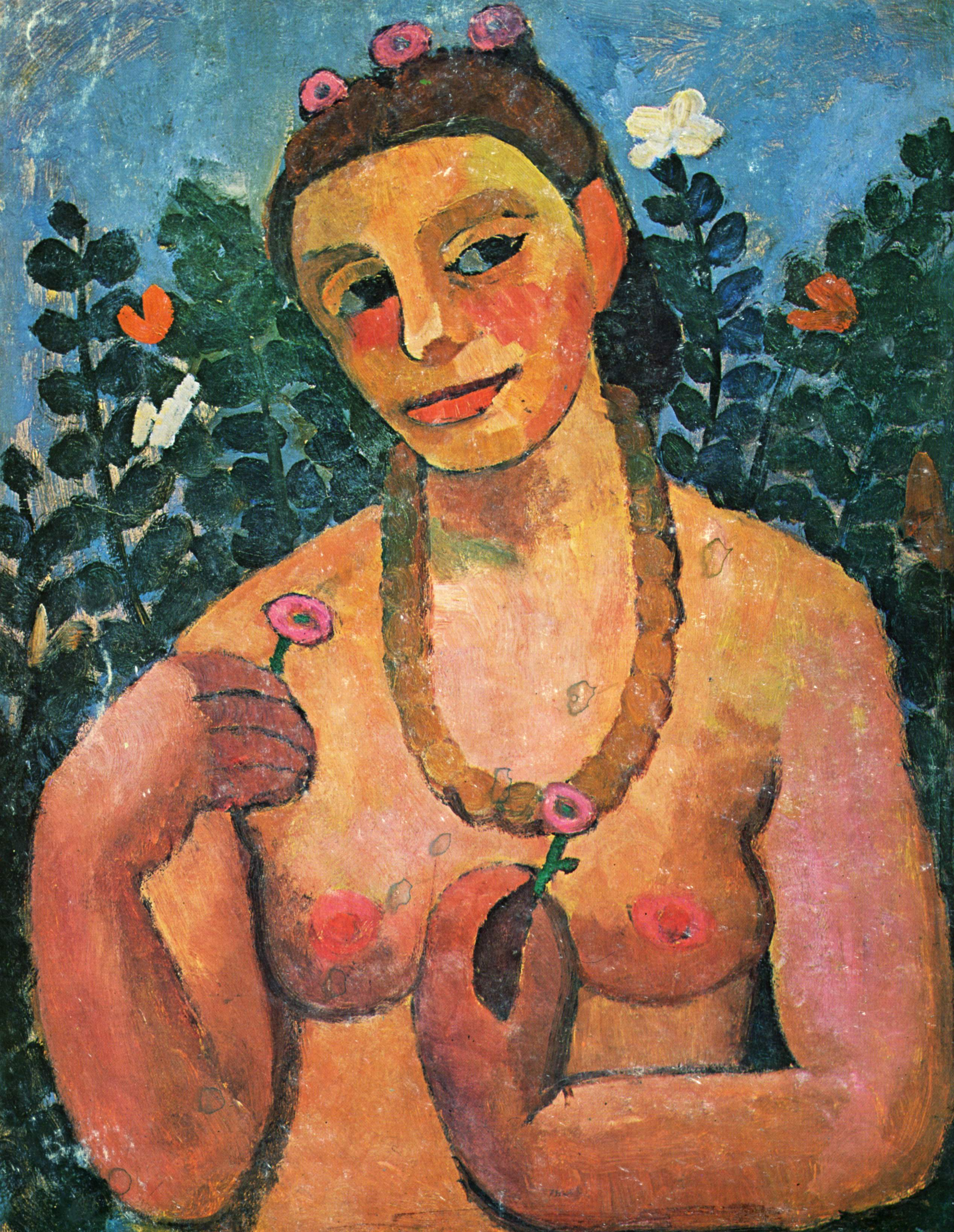
Paula Modersohn-Becker, Self-Portrait, 1906

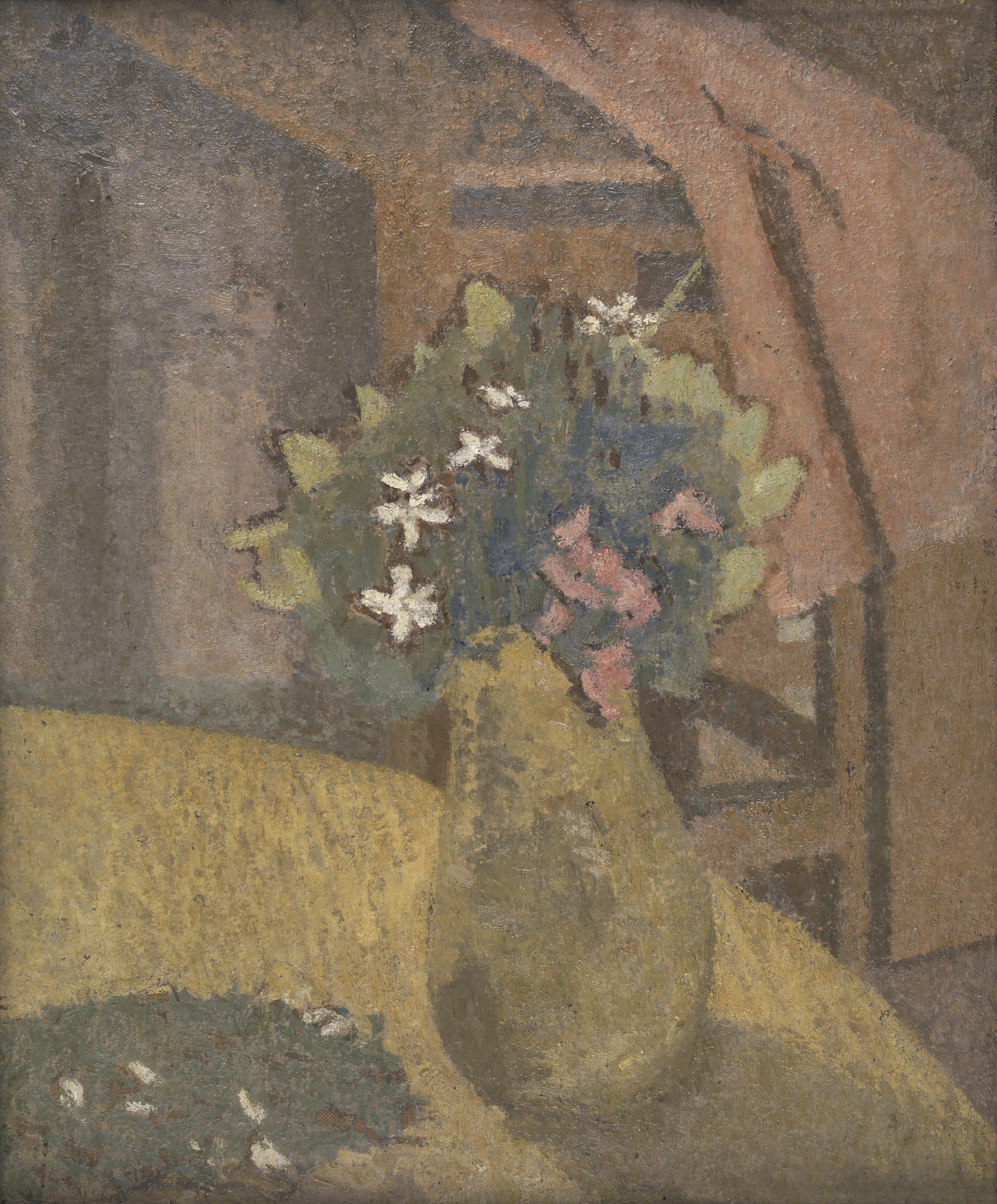
Gwen John, Vase of Flowers, n.d. (ca. 1910s)

- Zella de Milhau (1870–1954), printmaker
- Dorothea A. Dreier (1870–1923), painter
- Martha Stettler (1870–1945), painter
- Enid Yandell (1870–1934), sculptor
- Emily Carr (1871–1945), painter
- Edith Woodman Burroughs (1871–1916), sculptor
- Elizabeth Campbell Fisher Clay (1871–1959), lithographer, etcher
- Elinor Darwin (1871–1954), engraver, portrait painter
- Elsa von Freytag-Loringhoven (1874–1927), Dada artist, happening artist, painter, sculptor
- Eliza Gardiner (1871–1955), painter and printmaker
- Elizabeth Shippen Green (1871–1954), painter, illustrator
- Emily Nichols Hatch (1871–1959), painter
- Anna Ostroumova-Lebedeva (1871–1955), graphic artist, watercolorist
- Florine Stettheimer (1871–1944), painter
- Elsie Higgins (1871–1953), painter, miniaturist
- Helen Savier DuMond (1872–1968), painter, miniaturist, sculptor, teacher
- May Gearhart (1872–1951), printmaker
- Bertha Zillessen (1872–1936), photographer, painter
- Ethel Carrick (1872–1952), English painter
- Pauline Powell Burns (1872–1912), first African-American artist to exhibit in California.
- Mary Foote (1872–1968), painter
- Eugenie Fish Glaman (1873–1956), printmaker
- Edna Boies Hopkins (1872–1947), woodcut prints
- Carol Brooks MacNeil (1871–1944), American sculptor
- Edith Maryon (1872–1924), sculptor
- Virginia Randall McLaws (1872–1967), painter
- Alice Michaelis (1875–1943), German painter, educator
- Nadežda Petrović (1872–1922), painter
- Winifred Smith Rieber (1872–1963), painter
- Helena Sturtevant (1872–1946), painter
- Bessie Potter Vonnoh (1872–1955), sculptor
- Beta Vukanović (1872–1972), painter
- María del Adalid (1873–1930), painter
- Augusta Curiel (1873–1930), photographer
- Juliet Thompson (1873–1956), painter
- Minette Teichmueller (1871–1970), painter
- Elizabeth Tuttle Holsman (1873–1956), painter
- Ethel Sands (1873–1962), painter
- Fanny Adele Watson (1873–1947), painter, lithographer
- Gertrude Partington Albright (1874–1959), American artist
- Romaine Brooks (1874–1970), painter
- Isabel Codrington (1874–1943), English painter
- Mary Dawson Elwell (1874–1952), English painter
- Mabel Esplin (1874–1921), stained glass artist
- Elsa von Freytag-Loringhoven (1874–1927), Dada artist and poet
- Violet Oakley (1874–1961), muralist, stained glass
- Henrika Šantel (1874–1940), painter
- Anne Belle Stone (1874–1949), painter
- Nellie Walker (1874–1973), sculptor
- Elenore Abbott (1875–1935), painter, teacher
- Lizzy Ansingh (1875–1959), painter
- Erma Bossi (1875–1952), painter
- Nellie Augusta Knopf (1875–1962)
- Clara McDonald Williamson (1875–1976), painter
- Dulah Marie Evans (1875–1951), painter, photographer
- Delle Miller (1875–1932), painter
- Margaret Preston (1875–1963), painter, printmaker
- Alice D. Engley Beek (1876–1951), painter
- Edith Dimock (1876–1955), painter
- Avgusta Šantel (1876–1968), painter, teacher and printmaker
- Christian Jane Fergusson (1876–1957), painter
- Emily Parker Groom (1876–1975), painter
- Lillian Genth (1876–1953), painter
- Fairlie Harmar (1876–1945), painter
- Gwen John (1876–1939), painter
- Maude Kerns (1876–1965), American painter and avant garde artist
- Paula Modersohn-Becker (1876–1907), painter
- Else Berg (1877–1942), painter
- Katherine Sophie Dreier (1877–1952), painter
- Meta Vaux Warrick Fuller (1877–1968), sculptor, painter, poet
- Elena Guro (1877–1913), painter, writer
- Annie Hurlburt Jackson (1877–1959), painter
- Kata Kalivoda (1877–1936), painter
- Laura Knight (1877–1970), painter and war artist
- Blondelle Malone (1877–1951), painter
- Gabriele Münter (1877–1962), painter
- Käte Schaller-Härlin (1877–1973), painter
- Hilda Annetta Walker (1877–1960), sculptor and painter
- Mabel May Woodward (1877–1945), painter
- Mathilde Battenberg (1878–1936), painter
- Margaret Gere (1878–1965), painter
- Edith Haworth (1878–1953), painter
- Wilhelmina Weber Furlong (1878–1962), painter, teacher
- Anna Coleman Ladd (1878–1939), sculptor
- Sr. Maria Stanisia (née Monica Kurkowski; 1878–1967), painter
- Pamela Colman Smith (1878–1951), illustrator and painter
- Ellen Trotzig (1878–1949), painter
- Emmy Worringer (1878–1961), German artist
- Émilie Charmy (1878–1974), painter
- Frances Farrand Dodge (1878–1969), painter and illustrator
- Elisabeth Epstein (1879–1956), painter
- Nell Choate Jones (1879–1981), painter, teacher
- Thea Schleusner (1879–1964), painter
- Anna Heyward Taylor (1879–1956), painter, printmaker
- Ada Hill Walker (1879–1955), scientific illustrator and artist
- Bessie Davidson (1879–1965), painter
- Vanessa Bell (1879–1961), painter and interior designer
- Daisy Radcliffe Beresford (1879–1939), painter and decorative artist
- Hedwig Jaenichen-Woermann (1879–1960), painter and sculptor
- Catherine Ouless (1879-1961), painter

== 1880–1889 ==
Marie Laurencin, 1913, Le Bal élégant, La Danse à la campagne

Sonia Delaunay, The last section of La prose du Transsibérien et de la Petite Jehanne de France, 1913

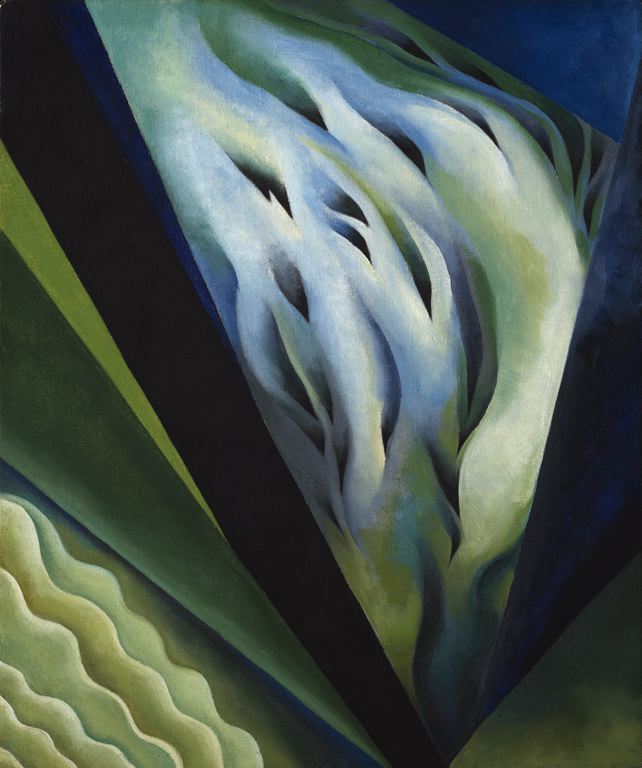
Georgia O'Keeffe, Blue and Green Music, 1921

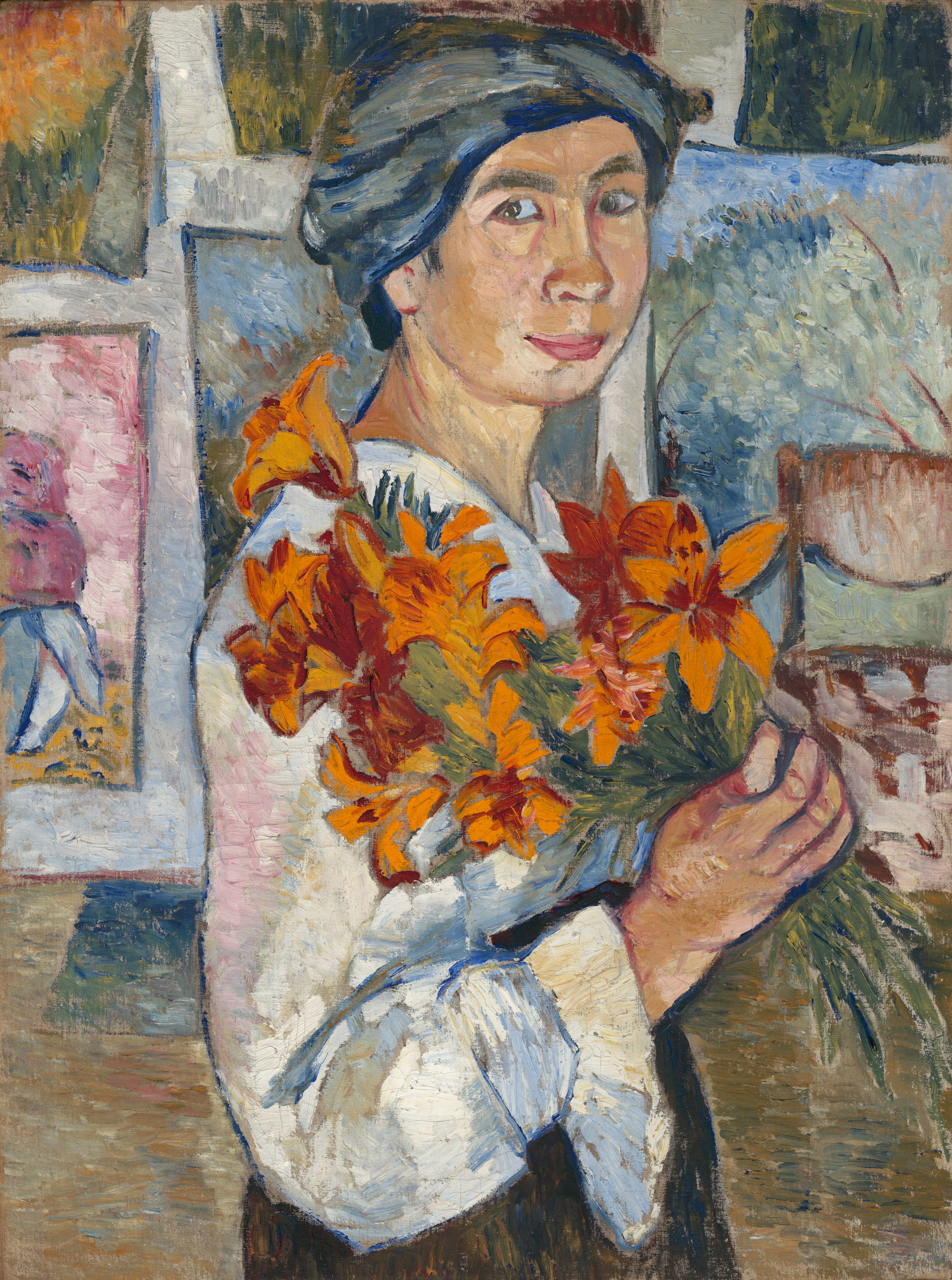
Natalia Goncharova, Self-portrait, 1907

- Rowena Meeks Abdy (1887–1945), painter
- Edith Cleaves Barry (1884–1969), American painter, photographer, sculptor
- Clarice Beckett (1887–1935), painter
- Carry van Biema (1881–1942), color theorist
- Ida Bothe (fl. 1881–1890), German-American artist and educator
- Bessie Marsh Brewer (1884–1952), sculptor
- Nessa Cohen, (1885–1976), sculptor
- Belle Cramer (1883–1978), painter
- Imogen Cunningham (1883–1976), photographer
- Sonia Delaunay (1885–1979), painter
- Olive Susanna DeLuce (1888–1970), painter, educator
- Tarsila do Amaral (1886–1973), Brazilian painter
- Marthe Donas (1885–1967), painter
- Aleksandra Ekster (1882–1949), painter

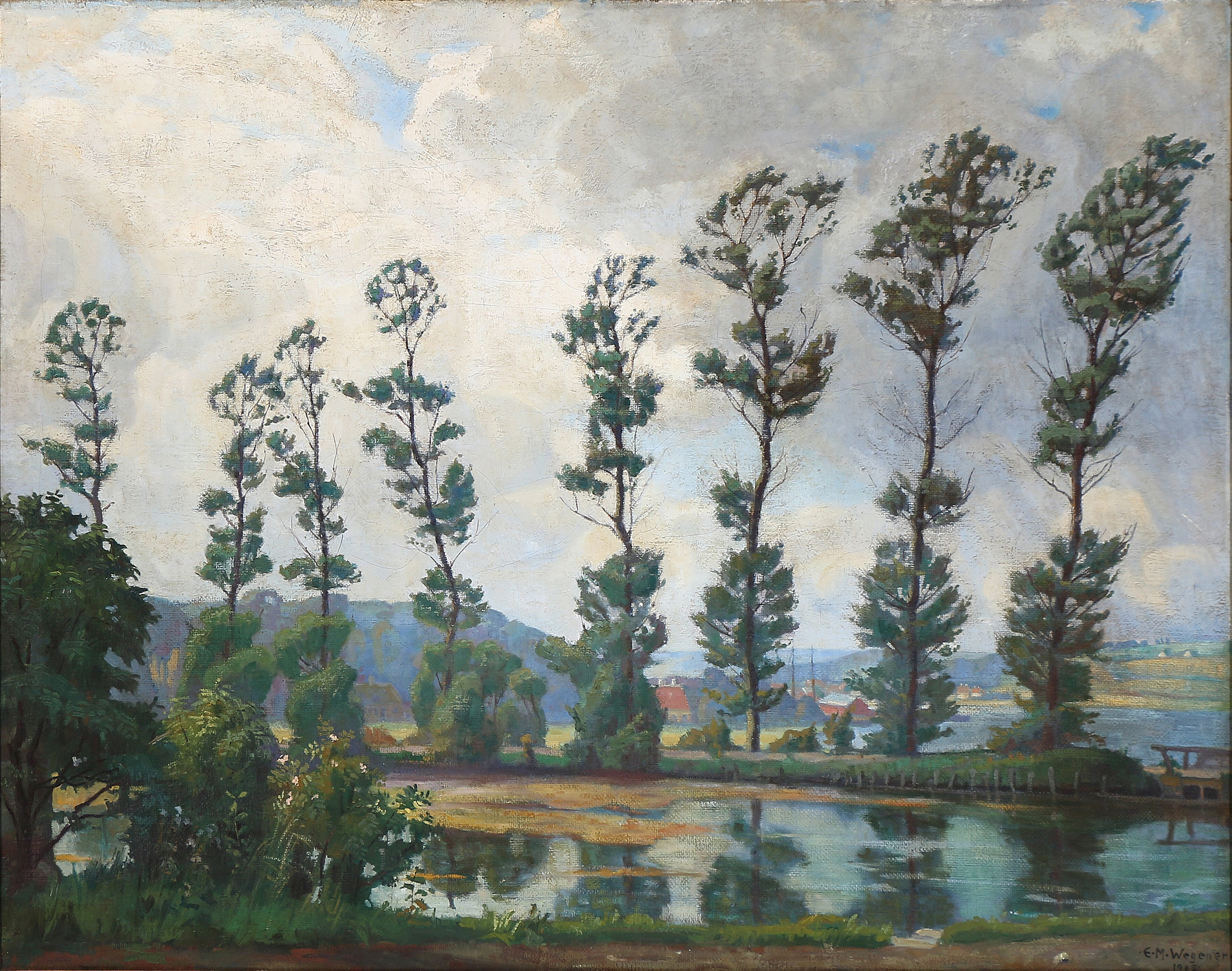
Lili Elbe, 1908, Poplars along Hobro Fjor

- Lili Elbe (1882–1931), painter
- Ester Ellqvist (1880–1918), painter
- Beryl Fowler (1881–1963), English painter
- Myrtle Merritt French (1886–1970), ceramicist
- Ethel Léontine Gabain (1883–1950), painter
- Laura Gardin Fraser (1889–1966), sculptor
- Natalia Goncharova (1881–1962), painter
- Norah Neilson Gray (1882–1972), painter
- Madeline Emily Green (1884–1947), painter
- Hilda Kristina Gustafson-Lascari (1885–1937), sculptor
- Tina Haim-Wentscher (1887–1974), German-Australian sculptor
- Lydia Bush-Brown Head (1887–1984) American painter and designer
- Ilse Heller-Lazard (1884–1934) French-Swiss painter
- Sigrid Hjertén (1885–1948), painter
- Hannah Höch (1889–1978), German painter, photographer, and photomontage artist
- Malvina Hoffman (1887–1966), sculptor
- Tora Vega Holmström (1880–1967), painter
- Valentine Hugo (1887–1968), illustrator
- Daisy Marguerite Hughes (1883–1968), American painter and lithographer
- Dora Koch-Stetter (1881–1968), German painter (aka Dora Stetter)
- Marie Laurencin (1883–1956), painter, printmaker
- Constance Jenkins Macky (1883–1961), painter, teacher
- Ana Marinković (1881–1973), painter
- Maria Martinez (1887–1980), potter
- Marlow Moss (1889–1958), sculptor, painter
- Geneva Mercer (1889–1984), sculptor
- Ethel Myers (1881–1960), sculptor, painter
- Ella Naper (1886–1972), jeweller & potter
- Hilda Rix Nicholas (1884–1961), painter
- Elizabeth Norton (artist) (1887–1985) printmaker, bronze sculptor, painter
- Bonita Wa Wa Calachaw Nuñez (1888–1972), Native American painter
- Georgia O'Keeffe (1887–1986), painter
- Olga Oppenheimer (1886–1941), German artist
- Elsie Palmer Payne (1884–1971), American painter and sculptor
- Jessie Burns Parke (1889–1964), painter, illustrator
- Ethel Paxson (1885–1982), painter
- Clara Elsene Peck (1883–1968), painter, illustrator
- Agnes Pelton (1881–1961), painter
- Marion Louise Pooke (1883–1975), painter
- Gladys Reynell (1881–1956), potter
- Anne Ryan (1889–1954), painter
- Helen Saunders (1885–1963), painter
- Marianne Saxl-Deutsch (1885–1942), painter, illustrator
- Zinaida Serebriakova (1884–1967), painter
- Henrietta Shore (1880–1963), painter
- Zulma Steele (1881–1979), painter
- Helen Margaret Spanton (1877–1934), painter
- Sophie Taeuber-Arp (1889–1943), painter
- Lucy Telles (c. 1885–1955), Mono Lake Paiute-Yosemite Miwok basket weaver
- Nadezhda Udaltsova (1886–1961), painter
- Doris Ulmann (1882–1934), photographer
- Vukosava Velimirović (1888–1965), sculptor
- Grace Vollmer (1884–1977) American painter
- Pepi Weixlgärtner-Neutra (1886–1981), Austrian-Swedish painter, graphic designer and miniaturist
- Laura Wheeler Waring (1887–1948), painter
- Carla Witte (1889–1943), German and Uruguayan painter and sculptor
- Marta Worringer (1881–1965), German artist
- Mary Agnes Yerkes (1886–1989), painter
- Marguerite Zorach (née Thompson) (1887–1968), painter

== 1890–1899 ==
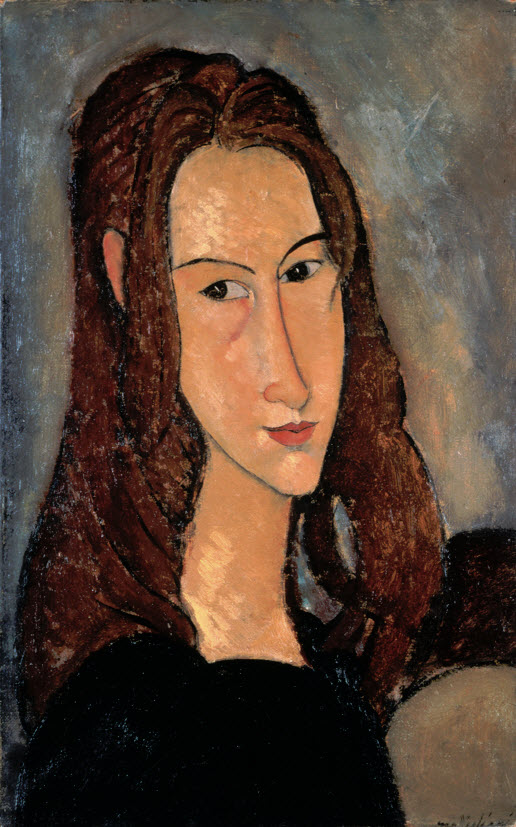
Amedeo Modigliani, Portrait of Jeanne Hébuterne, 1918

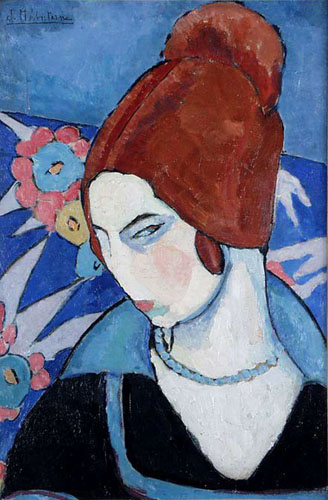
Jeanne Hébuterne,Self portrait, 1916

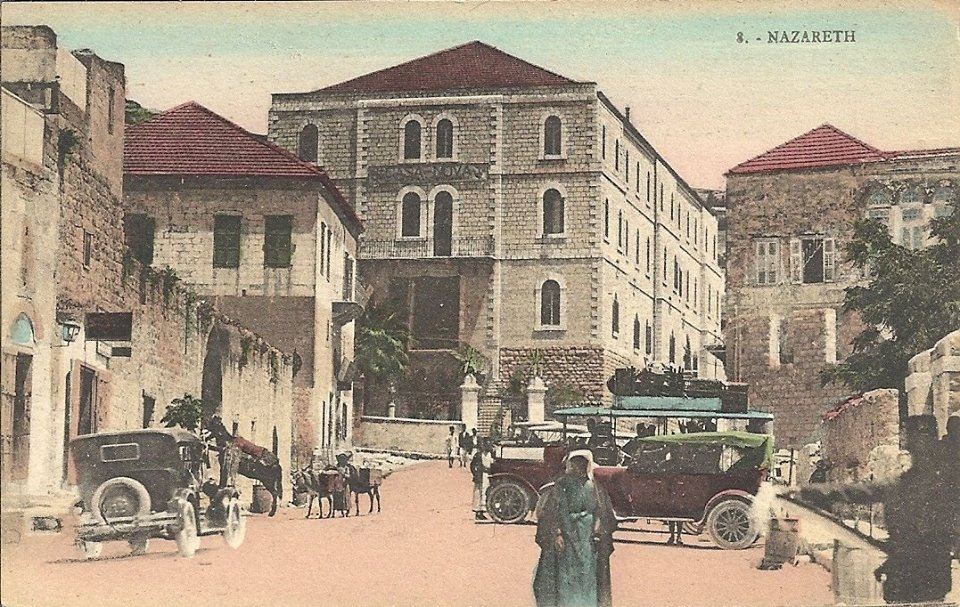
Nazareth, ca 1925, by Palestinian photographer Karimeh Abbud

- Berenice Abbott (1898–1991), photographer
- Karimeh Abbud (1896–1940), photographer
- Eileen Agar (1899–1991), painter, collage
- Elene Akhvlediani (1898–1975), painter
- Anni Albers (1899–1994), designer, weaver and graphic artist
- Elsie Allen (1899–1990), Cloverdale Pomo basket weaver
- Mabel Alvarez (1891–1985), painter
- Peggy Bacon (1895–1987), printmaker, painter, illustrator
- Eugenie Baizerman (1899–1949), painter
- Mária Barta (1897–1969), painter
- Carrie Bethel (1898–1974), Mono Lake Paiute basket weaver
- Dora Bianka (c. 1895–1979), Polish painter, illustrator
- Clara Birnberg (1894–1989), illustrator, portraitist, sculptor
- Dorrit Black (1891–1951), painter
- Kathleen Blackshear (1897–1988), painter
- Lucile Blanch (1895–1981), painter
- Elise Blumann (1897–1990), painter
- Ruth Harris Bohan (1891–1981), painter
- Regina Cassolo Bracchi (1894–1974), sculptor
- Alice Standish Buell (1892–1960), painter, etcher
- Claude Cahun (1894–1954), photographer, author
- Dora Carrington (1893–1932), painter
- Dorothy Coke (1897–1979), painter
- Isabel Cooper (1892–1984), illustrator primarily known for depicitons of animals collected on research expeditions
- Mildred Coughlin (1892–1984), painter, printmaker, illustrator
- Trena Cox (1895–1980), stained glass artist
- Grace Crowley (1890–1979), painter
- Louise Dahl-Wolfe (1895–1989), photographer
- Florence Davidson (1896–1993), Haida basket weaver
- Paula Eliasoph (1895–1983), painter, printmaker, illustrator
- Margaret Firth (1898–1991), painter
- Lillian Florsheim (1896–1988), sculptor
- Helen Katharine Forbes (1891–1945), muralist
- Enid Foster (1895–1979), artist, sculptor, playwright
- Frances Foy (1890–1963), artist, muralist
- Elsa Fraenkel (1892–1975), sculptor
- Alethea Garstin (1894–1978), English painter
- Laura Gilpin (1891–1979), photographer
- Minetta Good (1895–1946), painter and printmaker, W.P.A. artist
- Laicita Gregg (1892–1975), painter
- Maija Grotell (1899–1973), ceramic artist
- Grace L. Hamilton (1894–1992), muralist
- Jennie Harbour (1893–1959), illustrator
- Nola Hatterman (1899–1984), painter
- Jeanne Hébuterne (1898–1920), painter
- Dörte Helm (1898–1941), artist, painter and graphic designer
- Marion Huse (1896–1967), painter and printmaker, W.P.A. artist
- Margaret Calkin James (1895–1985), calligrapher, graphic designer, textile printer, watercolour painter, printmaker
- Lotte Jacobi (1896–1990), photographer
- Alison Mason Kingsbury (1898–1988), painter, muralist
- Georgina Klitgard (1893–1976), muralist
- Gina Knee Brook (1898–1982), painter
- Winifred Knights (1899–1947), painter
- Katarzyna Kobro (1898–1951), sculptor
- Anka Krizmanić (1896–1987), Croatian painter and printmaker
- Dorothea Lange (1895–1965), photographer
- Dorothy P. Lathrop (1891–1980), American illustrator and writer
- Gertrude K. Lathrop (1896–1996), American sculptor
- Mercédès Legrand (1893–1945), Spanish-born Belgian painter, sculptor, poet
- Eva Leigh (1895–1981) English portraitist and silhouettist
- Tamara de Lempicka (1898–1980), painter
- Rosy Lilienfeld (1896–1942), German illustrator
- Lucile Lloyd (1894–1941), muralist
- Lou Loeber (1894–1983), painter
- Agnes Lowrie (1892–1964), landscape artist
- Agustina González López (1891–1936), writer and artist from the Generation of '27
- Gladys M. Lux (1899–2003), painter, printmaker
- Suzanne Malherbe (1892–1972), illustrator, designer
- Hildreth Meière (1892–1961), mosaicist
- Yevonde Middleton (1893–1975), photographer
- Lilian May Miller (1895–1943), woodblock printer and painter
- Špelca Mladič (1894–1981), Slovenian painter and designer
- Tina Modotti (1896–1942), photographer
- Lucia Moholy (1894–1989), photographer
- Olive Mudie-Cooke (1890–1925), painter
- Louise Nevelson (1899–1988), sculptor
- Marjorie Ann Nuhn (1898–1988), painter
- Bashka Paeff (1894–1979), sculptor
- Tonita Peña (1893–1949), works on paper, muralist
- Zora Petrović (1894–1962), painter
- Dulcie Mary Pillers (1891–1961), medical illustrator
- Mira Pintar (1891–1980) - artist and art collector
- Orovida Camille Pissarro (1893–1968), painter, printmaker
- Pearlie Posey (1894–1984), textile artist
- Dod Procter (1892–1972), painter
- Jessie Beard Rickly (1895–1975), painter
- Hannah Ryggen (1894–1970), textile artist
- Kay Sage (1898–1963), painter
- Augusta Savage (1892–1962), sculptor
- Bertha Schaefer (1895–1971), furniture designer, galleryist
- Elsa Schiaparelli (1890–1973), fashion, textiles
- Martel Schwichtenberg (1896–1945), painter and designer
- Dorothy Hope Smith (1895–1955), artist
- Janet Sobel (1893–1968), painter
- Varvara Stepanova (1894–1958), painter and designer
- Vere Temple (1898–1980), wildlife illustrator
- Alma Thomas (1891–1978), painter
- Hedwig Thun (1892–1969), painter
- Charley Toorop (1891–1955), painter
- Marion Gray Traver (1892–1979), painter
- Beulah Woodard (1895–1955), sculptor
- Catharine Wharton Wright (1899–1988), painter
- Marie Elisabeth Wrede (1898–1981), painter
- Ogura Yuki (1895–2000), painter

== 1900–1909 ==
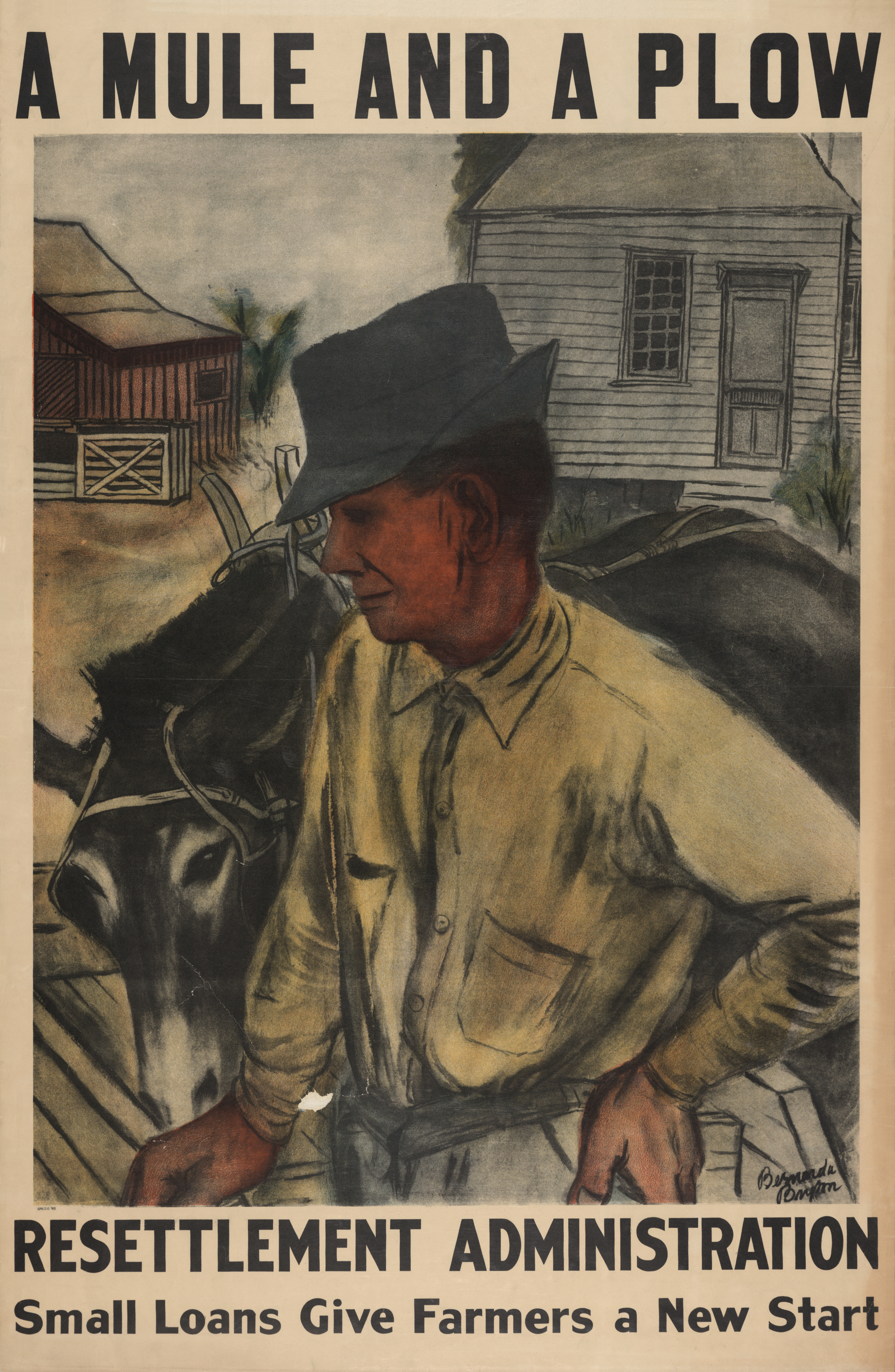
Bernarda Bryson Shahn, Resettlement Administration poster, c. 1935–1937

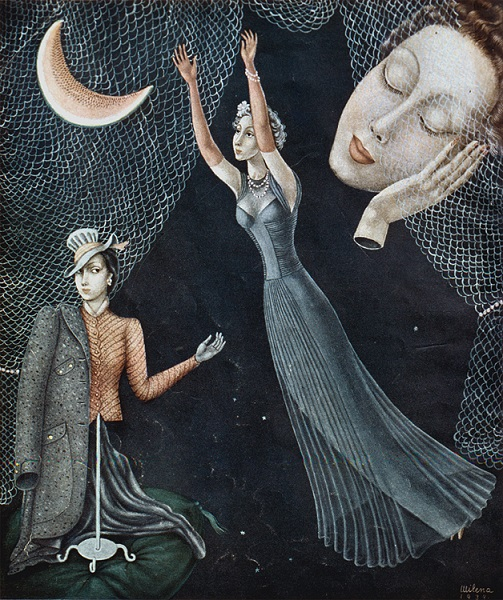
Milena Pavlović-Barili, Hot Pink with Cool Grey, 1940

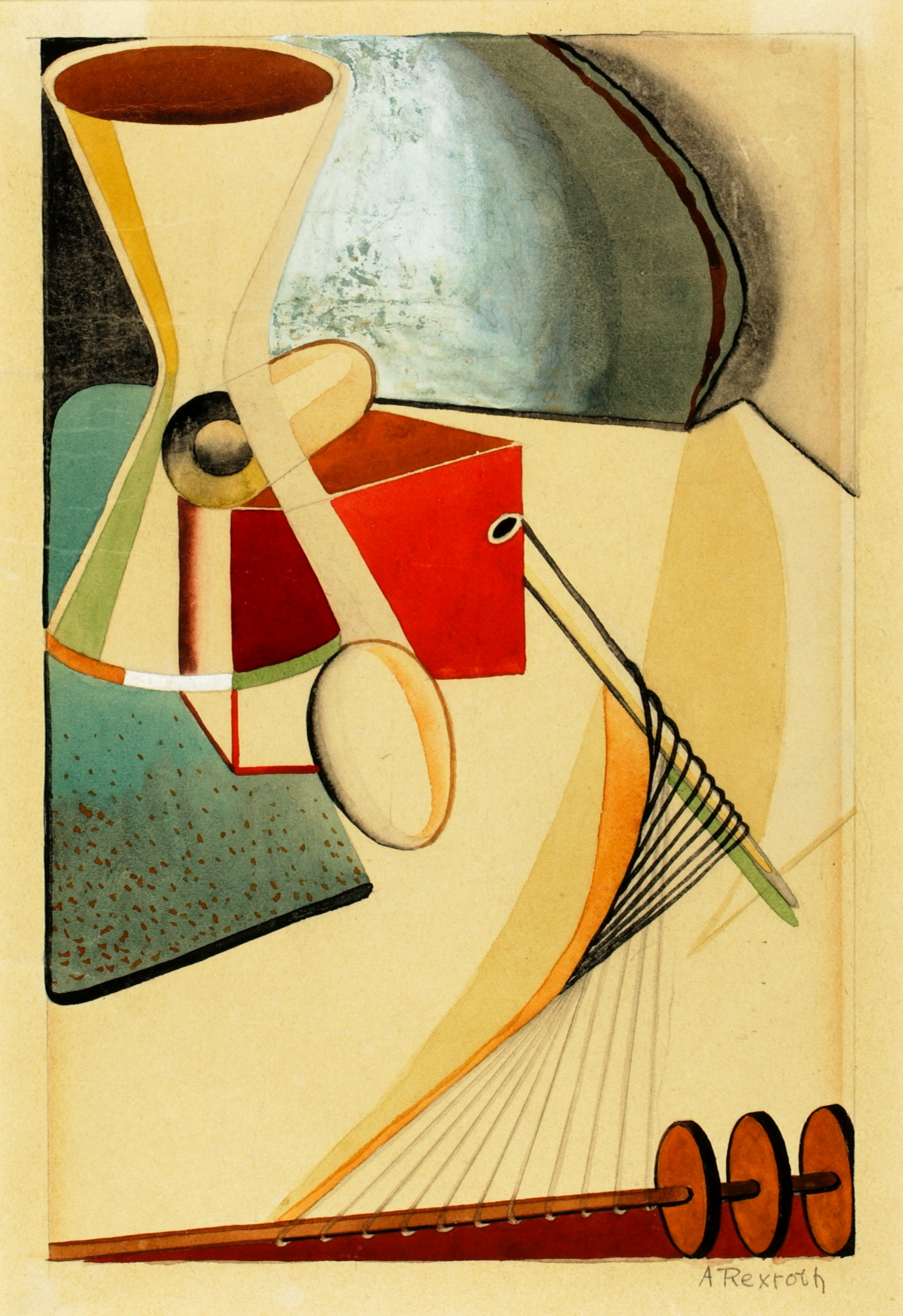
Andree Rexroth – Composition, ca. 1935-1943

- Gertrude Abercrombie (1909–1977), painter
- Mary Adshead (1904–1995), muralist, painter
- Maxine Albro (1903–1966), muralist, printmaker
- Griselda Allan (1905–1987), painter
- Catherine Tharp Altvater (1907–1984), painter
- Grace Greenwood Ames (1905–1979) artist, muralist
- Rita Angus (1908–1970), painter
- Mariam Aslamazyan (1907–2006), painter
- Eranuhi Aslamazyan (1910–1998), painter
- Evgenia Baykova (1907–1997), painter
- Celia Frances Bedford (1904–1959), painter, printmaker
- Suzanne Belperron (1900–1983), jeweler
- Ruth Bernhard (1905–2006), photographer
- Nellie Geraldine Best (1905–1990), muralist, sculptor
- Isabel Bishop (1902–1988), painter
- Frances Blakemore (1906–1997), printmaker
- Lucienne Bloch (1909–1999), painter
- Bernice Boeschenstein (1906–1951), painter
- Elisa Maria Boglino (1905–2002), painter
- Dorr Bothwell (1902–2000), painter, printmaker
- Margaret Bourke-White (1904–1971), photographer
- Dorothea Braby (1909–1987), painter, book illustrator
- Lola Álvarez Bravo (1907–1993), photographer
- Emmy Bridgewater (1906–1999), painter, poet
- Felicia Browne (1904–1936), artist, activist
- Marjorie Frances Bruford (1902–1958), painter
- Margaret Brundage (1900–1976), illustrator
- Norma Bull (1906–1980), painter
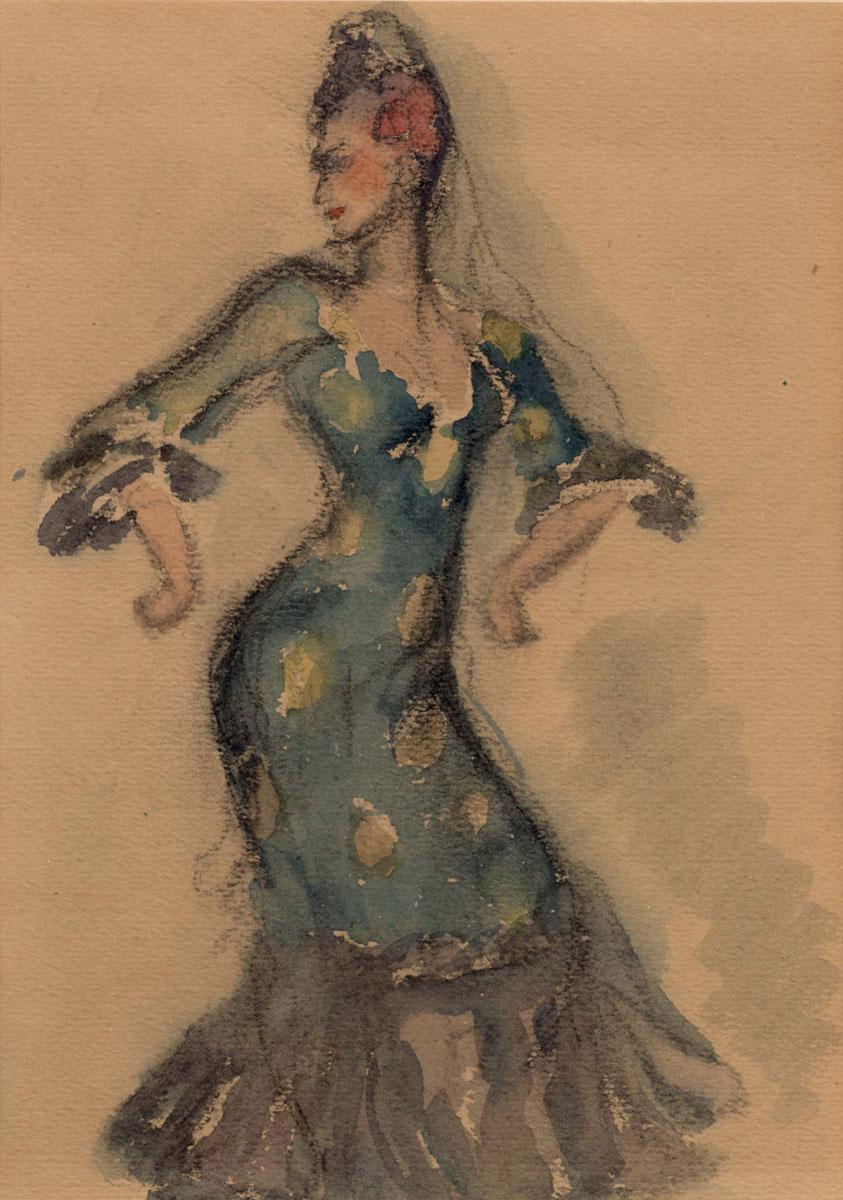
- The Last Flamenco by Charlotta Burešová, depicting Dutch Jew Catharina Brücker while imprisoned in the Theresienstadt Ghetto
  Charlotta Burešová (1904–1983), painter
- Selma Burke (1900–1995), sculptor
- Nancy Carline (1909–2004), painter
- Blanche Carstenson (1907–2002), fabric artist
- Ruth Chaney (1908–1973), printmaker
- Suzanne Chapman (1904-1990), painter
- Marie Z. Chino (1907–1982), ceramic artist
- Grace Clements (1905–1969), muralist, mosaicist, art critic
- Marion Osborn Cunningham (1908–1948), printmaker
- Martina Gangle Curl (1906–1994), artist, activist
- Dorothy Dehner (1901–1994), sculptor, printmaker
- Dorothea H. Denslow (1900–1971), sculptor, educator
- Evelyn Dunbar (1906–1960), painter
- Claire Falkenstein (1908–1997), sculptor, painter, printmaker
- Perle Fine (1905–1988), painter
- Leonor Fini (1907–1996), painter
- Cornelia MacIntyre Foley (1909–2010), painter
- Constance Edith Fowler (1907–1996), painter, printmaker, author, educator
- Gisèle Freund (1908 or 1912–2000), photographer
- Gyo Fujikawa 1908–1998), illustrator and author
- Zhenya Gay (1906–1978), illustrator
- Frančiška Giacomelli Gantar (1905–1988) - bobbin lacemaker, drafter, designer
- Evelyn Gibbs (1905–1991), engraver, art teacher
- Elizabeth Ginno (1907–1991) painter, printmaker
- Marion Greenwood (1909–1970), artist, muralist
- Edith Hamlin (1902–1992), muralist, landscape and portrait painter
- Isobel Heath (1908–1989), artist, poet
- Barbara Hepworth (1903–1975), sculptor
- Josette Hébert-Coëffin (1906–1973)
- Gertrude Hermes (1901–1983), print maker and sculptor
- Elsie Dalton Hewland (1901–1979), painter
- Karen Holtsmark (1907–1998), painter
- Ludmila Janovská (1907–after 1962), painter
- Ray Howard-Jones (1903–1996), painter
- Lois Mailou Jones (1905–1998), painter
- Rebecca Field Jones (1905–2002), sculptor, educator
- Frida Kahlo (1907–1954) painter
- Maude Kegg (1904–1986), bead artist
- Anna Kostrova (1909–1994), painter, graphic artist
- Lee Krasner (1908–1984), painter
- Doris Lee (1905–1983), painter
- Karin van Leyden (1906–1977), painter
- Ruth Harriet Louise (1903–1940), photographer
- Maria Luiko (1904–1941), painter and printmaker
- Helen Lundeberg (1908–1999), painter
- Margaret Macadam (1902–1991), illustrator
- Sheila Marbain (1908–2008), master printmaker
- Tatyana Mavrina (1902–1996), painter and book illustrator
- Dorothy Meredith (1906–1986), American artist and educator, known for fiber art.
- Mabel McKay (1907–1993), basket weaver
- Miriam McKinnie (1906–1987), muralist
- Dora Maar (1907–1997), photographer, painter, poet
- Maruja Mallo (1902–1995), painter
- Leza McVey (1907–1984), ceramist
- Doris Meltzer (1908–1977), printmaker and art dealer
- Hansel Mieth (1909–1998), photographer
- Anna Louisa Miller (1906–1997), painter
- Lee Miller (1907–1977), photographer
- Lisette Model (1901–1983), photographer
- Martha Mood (1908–1972), stitchery artist, ceramic artist, photographer
- Barbara Morgan (1900–1992), photographer
- Donia Nachshen (1903–1987), illustrator, poster artist
- Fannie Nampeyo (1900–1987), potter, ceramic artist
- Alice Neel (1900–1984), painter
- Loukia Nicolaidou (1909–1994), painter
- Olive Nuhfer (1901–1996), painter
- Vevean Oviette (1902–1986), printmaker
- Essie Parrish (1902–1979), Kashaya Pomo basket weaver
- Betty Parsons (1900–1982), painter, gallerist
- Milena Pavlović-Barili (1909–1945), painter
- Irene Rice Pereira (1902–1971), painter, author
- Trude Petri (1906–1998), ceramic designer
- Mary Potter (1900–1981), painter
- Dorothy Wagner Puccinelli (1901–1974), muralist, painter
- Mildred Rackley (1906–1992), printmaker
- Alice Rahon (1904–1987) painter
- Margaretha Reichardt (1907–1984), textile designer
- Andrée Rexroth (1902–1940), painter
- Leni Riefenstahl (1902–2003), filmmaker
- Elizabeth Rivers (1903–1964), painter, engraver, illustrator and author
- Louise Emerson Ronnebeck (1901–1980), painter
- Stella Schmolle (1908–1975), painter
- Eva Schulze-Knabe (1907–1976), painter
- Ethel Schwabacher (1903–1984), painter
- Clara Seley (1905–2003) Russian Empire-born American sculptor, painter
- Bernarda Bryson Shahn (1903–2004), painter, lithographer
- Jessamine Shumate (1902–1990), painter
- Elena Skuin (1909–1986), painter
- Lolo Soldevilla (1901–1971), painter, sculptor
- Mary Tillman Smith (1904–1995), painter
- Virginia Snedeker (1909–2000), painter
- Ethel Spears (1903–1974), painter
- Doris Spiegel (1901–1996), illustrator, printmaker
- Maybelle Stamper (1907–1995), printmaker
- Sultana Suruzhon (1900–1961), painter
- Lenore Tawney (1907–2007), fiber artist, sculptor
- Remedios Varo (1908–1963), painter
- Elsa Vaudrey (1905–1990), painter
- Maria Helena Vieira da Silva (1908–1992), painter
- Ilse Weber (1908–1944), painter
- Thelma Frazier Winter (1903–1977), ceramic sculptor and enamelist
- Henriette Wyeth (1907–1997), painter
- Maria Zubreeva (1900–1991), painter, graphic artist

== 1910–1919 ==
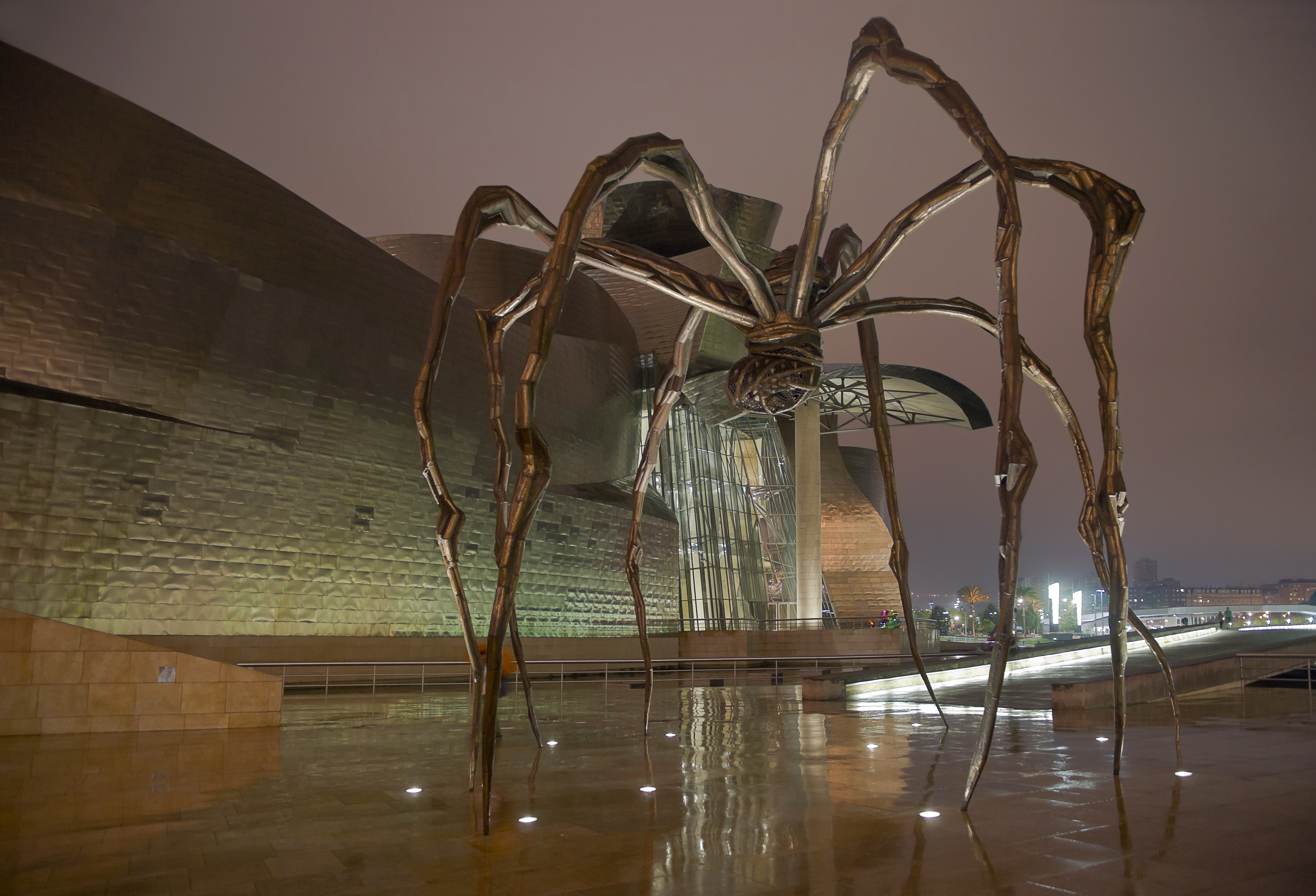
Louise Bourgeois, Maman, Bilbao, Spain

- Ida Abelman (1910–2002), painter
- Blanch Ackers (1914–2003), painter
- Taisia Afonina (1913–1994), painter
- Eileen Aldridge (1916–1990), painter, art restorer
- Evgenia Antipova (1917–2009), painter
- Eve Arnold (1912–2012), photographer
- Gwen Barnard (1912–1988), painter, printmaker
- Bernece Berkman (1911–1988), painter
- Semiha Berksoy (1910–2004), painter, opera singer
- Ana Bešlić (1912–2008), sculptor
- Louise Bourgeois (1911–2010), sculptor
- Doris Blair (1915–2011), painter
- Harriet Bogart (1917–1988), painter
- Eden Box (1919–1988), painter
- Leonora Carrington (1917–2011), painter
- Elizabeth Catlett (1915–2012) sculptor, printmaker
- Chien-Ying Chang (1913–2004), painter
- Malvina Cheek (1915–2016), painter
- Helen Cordero (1915–1994), ceramic artist
- Elaine de Kooning (1918–1989), painter
- Maya Deren (1917–1961), filmmaker and theorist, photographer
- Yvonne Drewry (1918–2007), painter and print-maker
- Nancy Proskauer Dryfoos (1918–1991), sculptor
- Aleksa Ivanc Olivieri (1916–2010), Slovenian painter, graphic designer and art restorer, who lived and worked in France
- Louise Lawrence Foster (1944–2020), paper artist
- Jane Frank (1918–1986), mixed-media painter, sculptor
- Louise Arnstein Freedman (1915–2001), printmaker
- Rosalie Gascoigne (1917–1999), sculptor, assemblage
- Wilhelmina McAlpin Godfrey (1914–1994), painter
- Blanche Grambs (1916–2010), painter, printmaker
- Dorothy Grebenak (1913–1990), textile artist
- Isabelle Greenberger (1911–1997), printmaker
- Riva Helfond (1910–2002), printmaker
- Dorothy Heller (1917 – 2003), painter, printmaker
- Carmen Herrera (1915–2022), painter
- Nora Heysen (1911–2003), painter
- Ruth Horsting (1919–2000), sculptor, professor
- Erlund Hudson (1912–2011), painter
- Tove Jansson (1914–2001), painter, illustrator, novelist
- Shirley Julian (1914–1995), painter, printmaker
- Kali (1918–1998), painter
- Yuki Katsura (1913–1991), painter
- Corita Kent (1918–1986), printmaker
- Gwendolyn Knight (1914–2005), painter
- Gunhild Kristensen (1919–2002), stained glass artist
- Jacqueline Lamba (1910–1993), painter
- Maria Lassnig (1919–2014), painter
- Miriam Laufer (1918–1980), painter
- Helen Levitt (1913–2009), photographer
- Frances Macdonald (1914–2002), painter
- Mary Macqueen (1912–1994), printmaker, drawing and mixed media
- Ethel Magafan (1916–1993), painter
- Fredy Malec Koschitz(1914–2001), painter and woodcarver
- Beatrice Mandelman (1912–1998), painter and printmaker
- Agnes Martin (1912–2004), painter
- Mercedes Matter née Carles (1913–2001), painter
- Louisa Matthíasdóttir (1917–2000), painter
- Sylvia Melland (1906–1993), painter
- Corinne Mitchell (1914–1993), painter
- Loraine Moore (1911–1988), printmaker
- Mona Moore (1917–2000), painter
- Hilda Grossman Morris (1911–1991), sculptor
- Esta Nesbitt (1918–1975), xerox artist, fashion illustrator
- Jane Ninas (1913–2005), painter
- Meret Oppenheim (1913–1985), sculptor
- Juliet Pannett (1911–2005), portrait artist
- Garnet Pavatea (1915–1981), potter
- Vita Petersen (1915–2011), painter
- Margaret Elder Philbrick (1914–1999), printmaker
- Tuulikki Pietilä (1917–2009), illustrator
- Elizabeth Carney Pope (1910–1991), muralist
- Mary M. Purser (1913–1986), painter
- Lilo Rasch-Naegele (1914–1978), painter, graphic artist, fashion designer, book illustrator
- Ruth Ray (1919–1977), painter
- Miriam C. Rice (1918–2010), sculptor and textile artist
- Britta Ringvall (1912–1987), painter
- Hulda D. Robbins (1910–2011), printmaker
- Charlotte Rothstein Ross (1912–1991), lithograph artist
- Norma Rubovits (1918–2016), paper marbler, book binder
- Maria Rudnitskaya (1916–1983), painter
- Charlotte Salomon (1917–1943), painter
- Amrita Sher-Gil (1913–1941), painter
- Clara Sherman (1914–2010), textile artist
- Nadezhda Shteinmiller (1915–1991), painter, stage designer
- Sylvia Sleigh (1916–2010), painter
- Ann Hunt Spencer (1913–1972), painter
- Thelma Johnson Streat (1911–1959), painter, dancer, educator
- Hedda Sterne (1910–2011), painter
- Dorothea Tanning (1910–2012), painter
- Domicėlė Tarabildienė (1912–1985), graphic artist, sculptor, book illustrator
- Gerda Taro (1910–1937), photographer
- Angotigolu Teevee (1910–1967), printmaker
- Anya Teixeira (1913–1992), photographer
- Elsa Thiemann (1910–1981), photographer
- Margaret Thomas (1916–2016), painter
- Bridget Bate Tichenor (1917–1990), painter
- Mary Tassugat (1918–2016), sculptor
- Mary Van Blarcom (1913–1953), printmaker
- Pablita Velarde (1918–2006), painter
- Pauline Vinson (1915–1986), illustrator
- Carol Weinstock (1914–1971), painter, printmaker
- Alicia Wiencek Fiene (1918–1961), painter
- Marion Post Wolcott (1910–1990), photographer
- Joan Elizabeth Woollard (1916–2008), sculptor
- Ellamarie Woolley (1913–1976), enamel artist
- Tetyana Yablonska (1917–2005), painter

== 1920–1929 ==
- Carla Accardi (1924–2014), painter
- Etel Adnan (1925–2021), painter, poet
- Ruthadell Anderson (1922–2018), textile and fiber artist
- Eva Aeppli (1925–2015), painter, sculptor
- Ida Applebroog (1929–2023), painter
- Diane Arbus (1923–1971), photographer
- Pamela Ascherson (1923–2010), sculptor, illustrator
- Alice Baber (1928–1982), painter
- Jo Baer (1929–2025), painter
- Irina Baldina (1922–2009), painter
- Ida Cadorin Barbarigo (1925–2018), painter
- Hannelore Baron (1926–1987), collage artist
- Lavinia Bazhbeuk-Melikyan (1922–2005), painter
- Mona Beaumont (1927–2007), painter, printmaker
- Brenda Bettinson (1929–2021), artist, muralist, radio station art editor, and professor
- Edith Birkin (1927–2018), painter
- Zlata Bizova (1927–2013), painter
- Nell Blaine (1922–1996), painter
- Sandra Blow (1925–2006), painter
- Kossa Bokchan (1925–2009), painter
- Isabel Case Borgatta (1921–2017), sculptor
- Druie Bowett (1924–1998), painter
- Geta Bratescu (1926–2018), visual artist
- Fanny Brennan (1921–2001), painter
- Esther Bubley (1921–1998), photographer
- Martha Burchfield (1924–1977), watercolorist
- Crucita Calabaza (Blue Corn, c. 1920–1999), ceramic artist
- Chinyee (1929–2023), painter
- Irene Chou (1924–2011), painter
- Delores Churchill (born 1929), basket maker
- Irene V. Clark (1927–1980), painter
- Lady Bird Cleveland (1926–2015), painter
- Jean Cooke (1927–2008), Royal Academy artist
- Marie Cosindas (1925–2017), photographer
- Nancy Ellen Craig (1927–2015), painter
- Amanda Crowe (1928–2004), woodcarver
- Mary Ann Currier (1927–2017), painter
- Nancy Cusick (1924–2010), collagist, painter, photographer
- Jay DeFeo (1929–1989), painter, visual artist
- Lucia DeRespinis (born 1927), industrial designer
- Madeleine Dimond (1922–1991), painter
- Lois Dodd (born 1927), painter
- Mavis Doering (1929–2007), Cherokee basket weaver
- Rosalyn Drexler (1926–2025), painter
- Sally Hazelet Drummond (1924–2017), painter
- Sonja Eisenberg (1926–2017), abstract painter
- Monir Shahroudy Farmanfarmaian (1924–2019), sculptor
- Francine Felsenthal (1922–2000), painter, printmaker
- Lilly Fenichel (1927–2016), painter
- Claire Fejes (1920–1998), sculptor
- Jackie Ferrara (born 1929), sculptor
- Marcelle Ferron (1924–2001), painter and stained glass artist
- Mary Fitzpayne (born 1928), painter
- Victorine Foot (1920–2000), painter
- Juana Francés (1924–1990), painter
- Helen Frankenthaler (1928–2011), painter
- Jane Freilicher (1924–2014), painter
- Carolyn Bartlett Gast (1929–2015), scientific illustrator
- Sonia Gechtoff (1926–2018), painter
- Ilka Gedő (1921–1985), painter, graphic artist
- Mokarrameh Ghanbari (1928–2005), painter
- Françoise Gilot (1921–2023), painter, writer
- Vee Guthrie (1920–2012), illustrator
- Terry Haass (1923–2016), painter, printmaker, sculptor
- Elaine Hamilton-O'Neal (1920–2010), painter
- Edie McKee Harper (1922–2010), photographer, painter, lithography, sculpture
- Grace Hartigan (1922–2008), painter
- Pati Hill (1921–2014), copier artist
- Martha Holmes (1923–2006), photographer
- Mansooreh Hosseini (1926–2012), painter
- Olga Jančić (1929–2012), sculptor
- Olga Jevrić (1922–2014), sculptor
- Ynez Johnston (1920–2019), painter, printmaker, sculptor and educator
- Ljubinka Jovanović (1920–2015), painter
- Lila Katzen (1925–1998), sculptor
- Margaret Keane (1927–2022), painter
- Cynthia Kenny (1929–2021), painter
- Ruth Kerkovius (1921–2007), painter, printmaker
- Frances Kornbluth (1920–2014), painter
- Maya Kopitseva (1924–2005), painter
- Tatiana Kopnina (1921–2009), painter
- Elena Kostenko (1926–2019), painter
- Marina Kozlovskaya (1925–2019), painter
- Yayoi Kusama (1929–2026), sculptor, performance art, installation art
- Valeria Larina (1926–2008), painter
- June Leaf (1929–2024), painter, sculptor
- Barbara Lekberg (1925–2018), metal sculptor
- Elizabeth Jane Lloyd (1928–1995), painter, teacher
- Bertina Lopes (1924–2012), painter
- Eleanore Mikus (1927–2017), painter
- Joan Mitchell (1925–1992), painter
- Inge Morath (1923–2002), photographer
- Aurèlia Muñoz (1926–2011), textile artist
- Emiko Nakano (1925–1990), painter, printmaker
- Annelies Nelck (1925–2014), French painter, engraver
- Barbara Neustadt (1922–1998), printmaker, book artist
- Anna-Stina Nilstoft (1928–2017), Swedish painter
- Zelda Nolte (1929–2003), sculptor/woodblock printmaker
- Margaret Olley (1923–2011), painter
- Mimi Parent (1924–2005), painter
- Pat Passlof (1928–2011), painter
- Joanna Pettway (1924–1993), quilter
- Sharni Pootoogook (1922–2003), printmaker
- Ludmiła Popiel (1928–2011), painter
- Dorothea Rockburne (born 1929), painter
- Leatrice Rose (1924–2014), painter
- Galina Rumiantseva (1927–2004), painter
- Kapitolina Rumiantseva (1925–2002), painter
- Betye Saar (1926–2026), assemblage sculpture
- Ana Sacerdote (1925–2012), painter, video artist
- Behjat Sadr (1924–2009), painter
- Takako Saito (born 1929), installation art, performance art
- Honoré Desmond Sharrer (1920–2009), painter
- Alice Shaddle (1928–2017), sculptor
- Sarai Sherman (1922–2013), painter, printmaker, sculptor
- Galina Smirnova (1929–2015), painter
- Nancy Spero (1926–2009), painter
- Katy Stephanides (1925–2012), painter
- Gerda Sutton (1923–2005), painter
- Dorothy Tanner (1923–2020), light sculptor
- Hannah Tompkins (1920–1995), painter, printmaker
- Anne Truitt (1921–2004), sculptor
- Draginja Vlasic (1928–2011), painter
- Nina Veselova (1922–1960), painter
- Stella Waitzkin (1920–2003), painter
- Myrtice West (1923–2010), painter
- Jane Wilson (1924–2015), painter
- Leona Wood (1921–2008), painter
- Jean Zaleski (1920–2010), painter
- Laura Ziegler (1927–2017), sculptor

== 1930–1939 ==
- Magdalena Abakanowicz (1930–2017), sculptor and graphic artist
- Janet Abramowicz (1930–2020), painter, printmaker
- Alice Adams (born 1930), sculptor, textile art, earthworks
- Maliheh Afnan (1935–2016), mixed media artist
- Gayleen Aiken (1934–2005), painter, musician
- Susan Allix (born 1934), book artist
- Edith Altman (1931–2020), painter, performance artist
- Emma Andijewska (born 1931), painter, writer
- Eleanor Antin (born 1935), Multi-media artist, conceptual artist, performance artist
- Maria Anto (1936–2007), Polish painter, poet, matron of the Art Prize
- Electa Arenal (1935–1960), Mexican muralist
- Anna Held Audette (1938–2013), painter, printmaker
- Helene Aylon (1931–2020), sculptor
- Gillian Ayres (1930–2018), painter
- Audrey Barker (1932–2002), installation artist
- Mardi Barrie (1930–2004), painter
- Mária Bartuszová (1936–1996), sculptor
- Annemirl Bauer (1939–1989), painter
- Baya (artist) (1931–1998), painter, potter
- Zuleika Bazhbeuk-Melikyan (born 1939), painter
- Hilla Becher (1934–2015), photographer
- Mary Holiday Black (1934–2022), Navajo basket maker
- Karen Boccalero (1933–1997), printmaker
- Maude Boltz (1939–2017), fiber artist
- Lee Bontecou (1931–2023), sculptor, printmaker
- Pauline Boty (1938–1966), painter
- Joan Brown (1938–1990), painter
- P. Buckley Moss (1933–2024), painter
- Barbara Bullock (born 1938), painter, educator
- Judy Chicago (born 1939), installation artist
- Chryssa (1933–2013), sculptor
- Meinrad Craighead (1936–2019), painter, printmaker
- Iran Darroudi (1936–2021), painter
- Agnes Denes (born 1931), conceptual artist, multidisciplinary
- Irina Dobrekova (born 1931), painter
- Martha Edelheit (born 1931), painter
- Lillian Wolock Elliott (1930–1994), American fiber artist, textile designer
- Marisol Escobar (1930–2016), sculptor
- Janet Fish (1938–2025), painter
- Audrey Flack (1931–2024), painter, printmaker, sculptor
- Eva Frankfurther (1930–1959), painter
- Sondra Freckelton (1936 – 2019), sculptor, watercolorist
- Elisabeth Frink (1930–1993), sculptor, printmaker
- Valerie Ganz (1936–2015), painter
- Irina Getmanskaya (born 1939), painter
- Tatiana Gorb (1935–2013), painter
- Shirley Gorelick (1936–2000), painter
- Elena Gorokhova (1933–2014), painter
- Carmen Gracia (born 1935), printmaker
- Nancy Graves (1939–1995), sculptor, painter, printmaker
- Martha Nessler Hayden (born 1936), American painter
- Mary Habsch (1931–2023), Belgian painter and printmaker
- Lee Hall (1934–2017), American abstract landscape painter, writer, university president
- Eva Hesse (1936–1970), sculptor
- Nicole Hollander (born 1939), illustration, comics
- Valerie Hollister (born 1939), painter, printmaker
- Nancy Holt (1938–2014), sculptor/ land art
- Joan Jonas (born 1936), performance artist
- Alison Knowles (born 1933), Fluxus, performance artist
- Sara Leighton (born 1937), portrait painter
- Ora Lerman (1938–1998), painter
- Lee Lozano (1930–1999), painter
- Joan Lyons (born 1937), photographer, book artist
- Althea McNish (c. 1933–2020), textile designer
- Totte Mannes (born 1933), painter
- Helena Markson (1934–2012), printmaker
- Emily Mason (1932–2019), painter
- Leyly Matine-Daftary (1937–2007), modernist painter
- Kay Metz (1932–2018), printmaker
- Norma Minkowitz (born 1937), fiber artist
- Valentina Monakhova (born 1932), painter
- Charlotte Moorman (1933–1991), performance artist, Fluxus
- Lois Morrison (born 1934), book artist
- Ree Morton (1933–1977), painter
- Deborah De Moulpied (1933–2023), sculptor
- Vera Nazina (born 1931), painter
- Carol Heifetz Neiman (1937–1990), Xerox artist, printmaker, pastel, pencil, painter
- Lorraine O'Grady (1934–2024), performance art, installation art
- Yoko Ono (born 1933), performance art, music
- Marilyn Pappas (born 1931), textile artist
- Fay Peck (1931–2016), American Expressionist artist
- Shirley Pettibone (1936 – 2011), painter
- Nancy Petyarre (1934/38–2009), painter
- Anirnik Ragee (born 1935), printmaker
- Deborah Remington (1930–2010), painter
- Bridget Riley (born 1931), painter
- Faith Ringgold (1930–2024), painter
- Carol Rosen (1933–2014), sculptor, collage and book artist
- Marilyn R. Rosenberg (born 1934), book artist
- Nadia Saikali (born 1936), painter
- Eliyakota Samualie (1939–1987), graphic artist and sculptor
- Carolee Schneemann (1939–2019), performance artist
- Joan Semmel (born 1932), painter
- Genie Shenk (1937–2018), paper artist
- Jacqueline Skiles (born 1937), printmaker, sculptor
- Anita Steckel (1930–2012), graphic artist
- Marjorie Strider (1931–2014), sculptor
- Michelle Stuart (born 1933), painter, sculptor, photographer
- Anita Louise Suazo (born 1937), ceramics
- Gilly Szego (1932–2023), painter
- Atsuko Tanaka (1932–2005), painting, sculpture, performance art, installation art
- Paula Tavins (1939 – 2019), painter
- Ana Vidjen (born 1931), sculptor
- Ann Zahn (1931–2020), printmaker
- Jiřina Žertová (born 1932), sculptor, painter, glass and art-industrial artist

== 1940–1949 ==
- Pacita Abad (1946–2004), painter
- Marina Abramović (born 1946), performance artist
- Gretchen Albrecht (born 1943), painter
- Aline Amaru (born 1941), Tahitian textile artist
- Laurie Anderson (born 1947), performance artist
- Heather Angel (born 1941), photographer, author
- Germaine Arnaktauyok (born 1946), printmaker, painter
- Alice Aycock (born 1946), sculptor
- Tina Barney (born 1945), photographer, filmmaker
- Jennifer Bartlett (1941–2022), painter
- Anne Bascove (born 1946), painter, printmaker, mixed media
- Lynda Benglis (born 1941), sculptor
- Judith Bernstein (born 1942), painter
- Anke Besser-Güth (1940–2019), sculptor
- Vivienne Binns (1940–2026), painter, enamels
- Shirley L. Bolton (1945–1984), painter
- Melinda Bordelon (1949–1995), painter, illustrator
- Fionnuala Boyd (born 1944), painter, photographer
- Dina Bursztyn (born 1948), visual artist and writer
- Deborah Butterfield (born 1949), sculptor
- Kathleen Caraccio (born 1947), printmaker
- Rhea Carmi (born 1942), abstract expressionist and mixed-media artist
- Squeak Carnwath (born 1947), painter
- Vera Chino (born 1943), Acoma Pueblo ceramic artist
- Wook-kyung Choi (1940–1985), painter
- Suzanne Klotz (born 1944), painter, sculptor
- Shelagh Cluett (1947–2007), sculptor fine art lecturer
- Susan Crile (born 1942), painter
- Lynn Davis (born 1944), photographer
- Virginia Dotson (born 1943), woodworker
- Orshi Drozdik (born 1946), photographer, sculptor, performance artist, painter, writer, conceptual artist
- Catherine Eaton Skinner (born 1946), multimedia artist
- Bracha Ettinger (born 1948), painter, photographer, psychoanalyst, writer
- Valie Export (born 1940), performance artist, video installations, photography
- Asma Fayoumi (born 1943), painter
- Carole Feuerman (born 1945), sculptor
- Helen C. Frederick (born 1945), printmaker
- Rose Garrard (born 1946), installation, video and performance
- Mary Giles (1944–2018), fiber artist
- Brenda Goodman (born 1943), painter
- Bonnie Gordon (born 1941), photographer, printmaker, installation artist
- Jan Groover (1943–2012), photographer
- Kathy Grove (born 1948), conceptual artist
- Graciela Gutiérrez Marx (1945–2022), mail artist
- Elisabeth Haarr (1945–2025), textile artist
- Maggi Hambling (born 1945), painter, sculptor
- Helen Hardin (1943–1984), painter
- Margaret Harrison (born 1940), painter
- Masumi Hayashi (1945–2006), photographer
- Mary Heilmann (1940–2026), painter, ceramicist, sculptor
- Judithe Hernández (born 1948), painter, muralist
- Rebecca Horn (1944–2024), sculptor, installation art
- Miyako Ishiuchi (born 1947), photographer
- Sanja Iveković (born 1949), interdisciplinary artist
- Susan Kaprov (born 1946), multi-disciplinary artist
- Nadine Kariya (born 1947), jewelry artist
- Rita Keegan (born 1949), multii-media artist
- Mary Kelly (artist) (born 1941), installation art, interdisciplinary
- Yvonne Walker Keshick (born 1946), quill artist and basket maker
- Gayane Khachaturian (1942–2009), painter
- Barbara Kozłowska (1940–2008), installation, environment artist, photographer
- Kirsten Kraa (1941–2020), painter
- Barbara Kruger (born 1945), conceptual artist
- Karólína Lárusdóttir(1944–2019), painter
- Annie Leibovitz (born 1949), photographer
- Pat Lipsky, (born 1940), painter
- Hung Liu, (1948–2021), painter
- Kistat Lund (1944–2017), graphic artist, illustrator, painter
- Markéta Luskačová (born 1944), photographer
- Mary Ellen Mark (1940–2015), photographer
- Linda McCartney (1942–1998), photographer
- Rebecca Medel (born 1947), fiber artist
- Susan Meiselas (born 1948), photographer
- Ana Mendieta (1948–1985), performance art, sculptor
- Annette Messager (born 1943), installation art, interdisciplinary
- Tania Mouraud (born 1942), installation art, mixed media
- Sheila Mullen (born 1942), painter
- Glòria Muñoz (born 1949), painter
- Elizabeth Murray (1940–2007), painter, printmaker
- Avis Newman (born 1946), painter, sculptor
- Gladys Nilsson (born 1940), painter
- Guity Novin (born 1944), painter
- Lydia Okumura (born 1948), sculptor
- Orlan (born 1947) performance artist
- Armanda Passos (1944–2021), painter
- Gloria Petyarre (1945–2021), painter
- Adrian Piper (born 1948), conceptual artist
- Sylvia Plachy (born 1943), photographer
- Stephanie Pogue (1944–2002), printmaker
- Susan Mohl Powers (1944–2023), sculptor, painter
- Helen Ramsaran (born 1943), sculptor
- Judy Rifka (born 1945), painter, video artist
- Elena del Rivero (born 1949), multi media artist
- Suellen Rocca (1943–2020), painter
- Stephanie Rose (1943–2023), painter
- Barbara Rosenthal (born 1948), photographer
- Martha Rosler (born 1943), photographer, performance, video
- Barbara Rossi (1940–2023), painter
- Marisa Rueda (1941–2022), sculptor
- Ursula von Rydingsvard (born 1942), sculptor
- Kakulu Saggiaktok (1940–2020), visual artist
- Barbara Schwartz (1949–2006), painter, sculptor
- Carol Schwartzott (born 1945), book artist
- Helen Shirk (born 1942), jewelry designer
- Sandy Skoglund (born 1946), photographer
- Hollis Sigler (1948–2001), painter
- Jo Smail (born 1943), mixed-media artist
- Claudia Smigrod (born 1949), photographer
- Jenny Snider (born 1944), painter, multimedia
- Joan Snyder (born 1940), painter
- Annegret Soltau (born 1946), graphic, performance, video, photocollage
- Pat Steir (born 1938), painter
- Vicki Stone (born 1949), painter
- Altoon Sultan (born 1948), painter
- Carol Sutton (1945–2025), painter
- Berenice Sydney (1944–1983), paintings, drawings, prints, children's books, costume design, performance
- Joyce Tenneson (born 1945), photographer
- Gail Tremblay (born 1945), installation artist and basket weaver
- Yvonne Edwards Tucker (born 1941), American potter
- Mym Tuma (born 1940), painter and mixed-media artist
- Lauretta Vinciarelli (1943–2011), painter, architect, educator
- Judy Tuwaletstiwa (born 1941), multi-disciplinary artist and writer
- Vivian Wang (born 1945), sculptor
- Anita Lynn Wetzel (1949–2021), paper artist
- Hannah Wilke (1940–1993), sculptor, photographer
- Annie Williams (born 1942), watercolor painter
- Val Wilmer (born 1941), photographer, author
- Jackie Winsor (1941–2024), sculptor
- Mona Zaalouk (1947–1995), painter, tapestry designer
- Zena Zipporah (born 1942), mixed-media artist and poet

== 1950–1959 ==
- Erna Aaltonen (born 1951), ceramist
- Eija-Liisa Ahtila (born 1959), videographer, photographer
- Peggy Ahwesh (born 1954), filmmaker
- Davida Allen (born 1951), painter, filmmaker
- Cecilia Alvarez (born 1950), painter, muralist
- Annie Antone (born 1955), basket weaver
- Anne Appleby (born 1954), painter
- Sue Arrowsmith (1950–2014), photographic artist
- Imna Arroyo (born 1951), printmaker
- Lynda Barry (born 1956), illustrator, comics
- Jane Boyd (born 1953), installation
- Lisa Bradley (born 1951), painter
- Chrisann Brennan (born 1954), painter
- Tara Bryan (1953–2020), painter, book artist
- Chila Kumari Burman (born 1957), printmaker, painter, installation artist
- Catherine Chalmers (born 1957), photographer
- Sophie Calle (born 1953), photographer, author, installation artist, conceptual artist
- Louisa Chase (1951–2016), painter, printmaker
- Emily Cheng (born 1953), painter
- Chinwe Chukwuogo-Roy (1952–2012), painter
- Victoria Civera (born 1955), interdisciplinary artist, painter
- Janet Cooling (1951–2022), painter
- Béatrice Coron (born 1956), multi media artist
- Sokari Douglas Camp (born 1958), sculptor
- Susan Derges (born 1955), photographic artist
- A. K. Dolven (born 1953), painting, film, and interventions in public space
- Lola Flash (born 1959), photographer
- Cherryl Fountain (born 1950), still life, landscape and botanical artist
- L'Merchie Frazier, (born 1951), fiber artist
- Joanne Gair (born 1958), painter, body art
- Anne Geddes (born 1956), photographer
- Anne Gilman (born 1953), mixed media
- Nan Goldin (born 1953), photographer
- Patricia Gonzalez (born 1958), painter
- Maïmouna Guerresi (born 1951), multimedia artist and photographer
- Jane Hammond (born 1950), painter, printmaker
- Akiko Hatsu (born 1959), illustrator, comics
- Gitte Hähner-Springmühl (born 1951), painter
- Jenny Holzer (born 1950), conceptual artist
- Roni Horn (born 1955), photographer
- Mona Hatoum (born 1952), video, installation
- Lubaina Himid (born 1954), mixed media
- Leiko Ikemura (born 1951), painter, sculptor
- Janel Jacobson (born 1950), ceramicist, wood carver
- Terrell James (born 1955), painter, sculptor
- Vanessa Paukeigope Jennings (born 1952), bead and textile artist
- Claudette Johnson (born 1959), painter
- Ann Kalmbach (born 1950), book artist and printmaker
- Beth Katleman (born 1959), sculptor
- Deborah Kennedy (born 1953), sculptor, painter, contemporary art
- Christine Kermaire (born 1953), book artist
- Sharon Kerry-Harlan (born 1951), textile artist
- Jessie Kleemann (born 1959), Greenlandic artist and writer
- Karen Kunc (born 1952), printmaker, book artist
- Maya Lin (born 1959), installation artist
- Marita Liulia (born 1957), photographer, digital and interactive media
- Cynthia Lockhart (born 1952), textile artist
- Sally Mann (born 1951), photographer
- Soraida Martinez (born 1956), artist, designer
- Michiko Matsumoto (born 1950), photographer
- Vicki Meek (born 1950), multimedia artist
- Moseka Yogo Ambake (1956–2019), painter
- Shirin Neshat (born 1957), filmmaker, videographer, photographer
- Deborah Niland (born 1950), painter, illustrator
- Kilmeny Niland (1950–2009), painter, illustrator
- Cady Noland (born 1956), sculptor
- Nona Orbach ( born 1953), multi-disciplinary artist
- Cornelia Parker (born 1956), sculptor, drawing, installation artist
- Yani Pecanins (1957–2019), book artist, mixed media artist
- Maria G. Pisano (born 1952), book artist
- Elisa Pritzker (born 1955), contemporary artist
- Ingrid Pollard (born 1953), portrait photographer
- Valerie Pourier (born 1959), buffalo horn carver
- Sheila Kanieson Ransom (born 1954), basket weaver
- Shani Rhys James (born 1953), painter
- Jenny Scobel (born 1955), painter
- Cindy Sherman (born 1954), photographer, filmmaker
- Noriko Shinohara (born 1953), multi-disciplinary artist
- Li Shuang (born 1957), painter
- Jiang Shuo (born 1958), sculptor
- Kiki Smith (born 1954), sculptor, printmaker, installation art
- Pamela Spitzmueller (1950–2025), book artist
- Gilda Snowden (1954–2014), painter
- Renee Stout (born 1958), photographer, installation art
- Rumiko Takahashi (born 1957), illustrator, author
- Zoja Trofimiuk (born 1952), sculptor, printmaker
- Alison Turnbull (born 1956), painter, sculptor
- Barbara Tyson Mosley (born 1950), American mixed media artist
- Linda Vallejo (born 1951), painting, sculpture, ceramics
- April Vollmer (born 1951), printmaker and book artist
- Carrie Mae Weems (born 1953), photographer, filmmaker
- Debra Weier (born 1954), printmaker, book artist
- Nancy Worden (1954–2021), metalsmith
- Emmi Whitehorse (born 1957), painter
- Eva Janina Wieczorek (born 1951), painter
- Sue Williams (born 1956), British visual artist
- Francesca Woodman (1958–1981), photographer
- Rhonda Zwillinger (1950–2019), multimedia art

== 1960–1969 ==
- Jessica Abel (born 1969), illustrator, author
- Yeşim Ağaoğlu (born 1966), installation art
- Rachel Ara (born 1965), conceptual and data art
- Sofia Areal (born 1960), painter
- Cosima von Bonin (born 1962), concept art
- Margarete Bagshaw (1964–2015), painter
- Fiona Banner (born 1966), wordscapes, sculpture, drawing, installation
- Vanessa Beecroft (born 1969), performance art
- Sonia Boyce (born 1962), mixed media, photography, installation, text
- Cecily Brown (born 1969), painter
- Tiffany Lee Brown (born 1969), interdisciplinary arts, performance, music, writing
- Jo Bruton (born 1967), British, painter
- Michele Burgess (born 1960), book artist
- Canal Cheong Jagerroos (born 1968), painter and conceptual artist
- Carolyn Cole (born 1961), photographer
- Justine Cooper (born 1968), mixed media
- Cecilie Dahl (born 1960), installation artist
- Tacita Dean (born 1965), film, drawing, photography, sound
- Simone Decker (born 1968), artist working with photography and installations
- Berlinde De Bruyckere (born 1964), painter, sculptor
- Kidist Hailu Degaffe (born 1969), Ethiopian contemporary artist
- Xiomara De Oliver (born 1967), Canadian painter
- Angela Dufresne (born 1969), painter
- Inka Essenhigh (born 1969), painter
- Mary Evans (artist) (born 1963), installation, works on paper
- Abigail Fallis (born 1968), sculptor
- Ceal Floyer (born 1968)
- Anna Fox (born 1961), photographer
- Else Gabriel (born 1962), performance artist and educator
- Ellen Gallagher (born 1965), painter, mixed media artist
- Linda Geary (born 1960), painter, teacher
- Lucy Glendinning (born 1964), sculptor
- Brita Granström (born 1969), painter, illustrator, author
- Kyungah Ham (born 1966), multimedia artist
- Maya Hayuk (born 1969), painter, muralist
- Helen Hiebert (born 1965), paper artist
- Taraneh Hemami (born 1960), multidisciplinary artist, installations, craft
- Iva Honyestewa (born 1964), basket maker
- Zuzanna Janin (born 1961), mixed-media, video artist, installation, sculptor
- Chantal Joffe (born 1969), painter
- Robin Kahn (born 1961), mixed-media, book artist
- Lori Kay (born 1962), sculptor, mixed media
- Hilja Keading (born 1960), video installation artist
- Toba Khedoori (born 1964), sculptor, mixed-media, drawings, paintings
- Rachel Khedoori (born 1964), sculptor, mixed-media
- Lorena Kloosterboer (born 1962), painter, sculptor
- Mariko Kusumoto (born 1967), fabric and metal artist
- Zoe Leonard (born 1961), photographer, visual artist
- Vera Lutter (born 1960), mixed-media
- Maria Marshall (born 1966), sculptor, painter, photographer, video artist
- Chie Matsui (born 1960), installation artist
- Amanda Matthews (born 1968), sculptor, painter, public art designer
- Shari Mendelson (born 1961), American sculptor
- Julie Anne Mihalisin, (born 1965), jewelry artist
- Karin Monschauer born 1960), Luxembourg embroiderer and digital artist
- Mariko Mori (born 1967), performance, installation
- Debora Moore (born 1960), glass artist
- Eva Navarro (born 1967), painter
- Virginia Nimarkoh (born 1967), photo installations
- Audrey Niffenegger (born 1963), printmaker, author
- Catherine Opie (born 1961), photographer
- Janette Parris (born 1963), drawing
- Olivia Peguero (born 1962), painter, sculptor, author
- Priya Pereira (born 1967), book artist
- Jennifer Wynne Reeves (1963–2014), painter
- Lique Schoot (born 1969), painter, photographer, installation
- Linda Sikora (born 1960), ceramist
- Lorna Simpson (born 1960), photographer
- Jonny Star (born 1964), sculptor, installation artist, collage artist
- Maud Sulter (1960–2008), portraiture, montage
- Roxanne Swentzell (born 1962), sculptor
- Sarah Sze (born 1969), installation art
- Tomoko Takahashi (born 1966), installation art
- Vibeke Tandberg (born 1967), photographer
- Ningiukulu Teevee (born 1963), illustrator
- Bernadette Thompson (born 1969), nail artist
- Jill Thompson (born 1966), illustrator, author
- Ela To'omaga-Kaikilekofe (born 1969), visual artist and arts administrator
- Patience Torlowei (born 1964), textile artist
- Isabelle Tuchband (born 1968), plastic artist
- Verónica Ruiz de Velasco (born 1968), painter
- Kara Walker (born 1969), collage artist, painter, printmaker, installation artist
- Laurie Walker (artist) (1962–2011), interdisciplinary artist
- Bettina Werner (born 1965), artist who invented the textured colorized salt crystal technique as an art medium
- Rachel Whiteread (born 1963), sculptor
- Ingrid Wildi-Merino (born 1964), Chilean-Swiss video artist
- Christine Wilks (born 1960), British digital artist
- Karen Willenbrink-Johnsen (born 1960), glass artist
- Melanie Yazzie (born 1966), sculptor, painter, printmaker
- gwendolyn yoppolo (born 1968), ceramist
- Andrea Zittel (born 1965), painter, sculptor

The list ends with artists born in 1969. For later births see List of 21st-century women artists.

== See also ==
- Women artists
- List of female comics creators
- List of Lulu Award winners
- Women in photography
- List of women photographers
- Photo-Secession
- Tenth Street galleries
- Beaver Hall Group
- Native American women in the arts
- List of female sculptors
- List of women artists in the Armory Show
