= Sylvia Melland =

British painter and printmaker

- Born: 1906
- Died: 1993 (aged 86–87)
- Known for: Painting and printmaking

Sylvia Melland (1906-1993) was a British painter and printmaker.

== Biography ==
Melland was born in Altrincham, Cheshire. She studied at the Manchester College of Art; the Byam Shaw School, 1925-8; the Euston Road School, 1937-9 and the Central School, 1957-60. Melland began her art career as a painter, but moved entirely to printmaking in the 1960s. Melland was a member of the Artists' International Association, an anti-fascist group.

Her work is included in the collections of the Manchester Art Gallery, the British Museum and the Tate Museum.
