= Michele Burgess =

American artist

- Born: 1960 (age 65–66)
- Died: 2024
- Known for: Painter, Book artist
- Website: micheleburgessart.com

Michele Burgess (born 1960) is an American artist and educator. She attended the University of San Diego and the Cranbrook Academy of Art. She is the director of the Brighton Press, an artist's book publisher founded in 1985.

In 2004 the Musée d'Art Américain Giverny held a retrospective of Burgess' work. Her work is in the collection of the University of Louisville, the Minneapolis Institute of Art, and the National Museum of Women in the Arts.
