= Rosy Lilienfeld =

German artist (1896-1942)

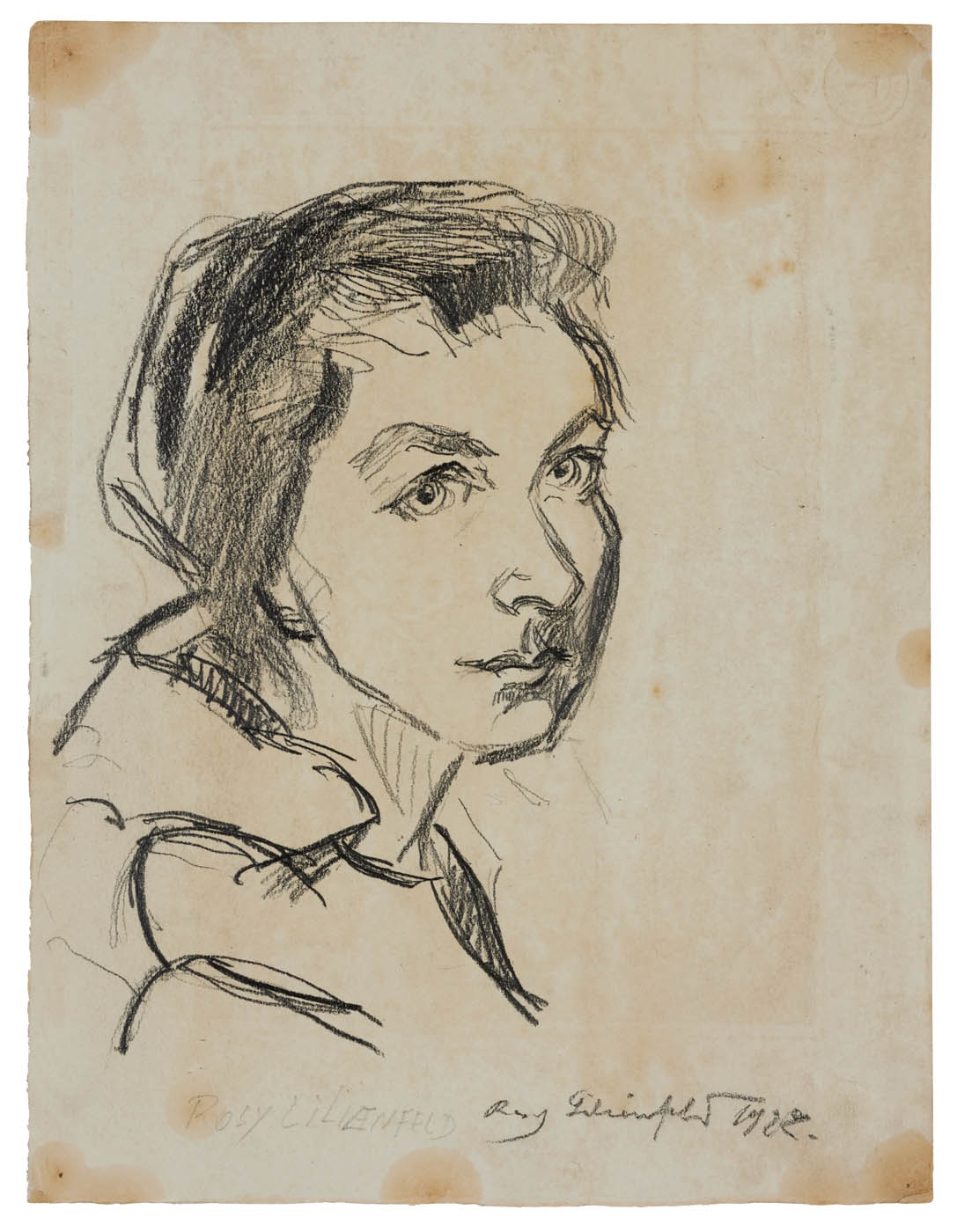
- self portrait
- Born: January 17, 1896; Frankfurt, Germany
- Died: September 30, 1942 (aged 46); Auschwitz concentration camp, Poland

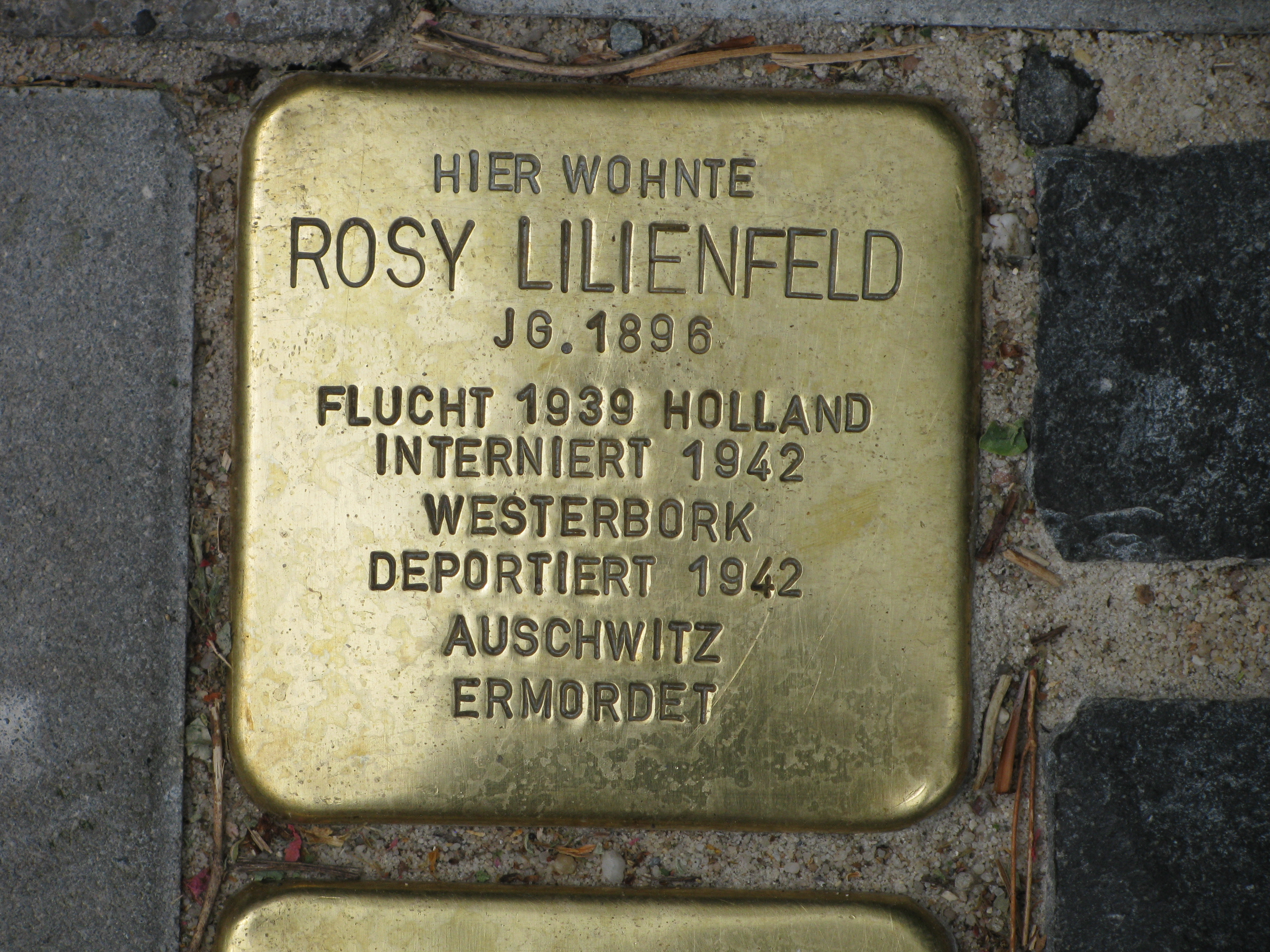
Stolperstein Rosy Lilienfeld, 1, Freiherr-vom-Stein-Straße 15, Westend, Frankfurt am Main

Rosy Lilienfeld (January 17, 1896 – September 30, 1942) was a German artist.

Lilienfeld was born on January 17, 1896, in Frankfurt, Germany. She died on September 30, 1942, in the Auschwitz concentration camp in Poland.

Her work is in the collection of the Städel museum.

In 2022 her work was included in the exhibition the Back into the Light: Four Women Artists – Their Works. Their Paths at the Jüdisches Museum Frankfurt. The exhibition featured Lilienfeld, Ruth Cahn, Erna Pinner, and Amalie Seckbach.

In 2023 a stolperstein in her honor was installed at Freiherr-vom-Stein-Straße 15, Frankfurt.
