= Elsie Higgins =

British artist and miniaturist

- Born: 6 April 1871
- Died: 1953 (aged 81–82)
- Education: Herkomer's Art School
- Occupations: artist and miniaturist

Elsie Higgins (6 April 1871 – 1953) was a British artist and miniaturist whose works appeared on display at the Royal Academy of Arts.

Higgins painted portraits, landscapes and miniatures. She exhibited her paintings at the Royal Academy of Arts in London eleven times between 1895 and 1916. These paintings included "Miss Edith Gorham" in 1899, "Summer Time" in 1900, "The Rompers" in 1901, and "A May Morning" in 1905. The latter is the only painting of hers currently in a British public art gallery or collection; it is in the collection of Plymouth City Museum and Art Gallery.

Higgins worked in Birkenhead, Cheshire (later Merseyside); Rye, Sussex; Shalford, Surrey; and Bushey, Hertfordshire between 1895 and 1916. The article "Some Lady Artists of Today" in The English Illustrated Magazine of September 1907 has a photograph and description of her work.

Higgins shared a house in Bushey with Edith Gorham (1864–1941), who was also an artist and deaf-mute from birth, for over 40 years. Both Higgins and Gorham studied at Herkomer's Art School, Bushey: Higgins attended in 1893 and Gorham in 1885.
