= Gwendolyn yoppolo =

American artist

gwendolyn yoppolo
- Born: 1968; Redwood City, California
- Known for: Ceramics
- Website: gwendolynyoppolo.com

gwendolyn yoppolo (b. 1968, Redwood City, California) is an American artist known for her ceramic work. She creates pieces with form and function. yoppolo attended Haverford College, Penn State University, and Columbia University. In 2017 an exhibit entitled Gwendolyn Yoppolo: Holding Forth was held at the Clay Studio in Philadelphia. Her work, scoopbowl service, was acquired by the Smithsonian American Art Museum as part of the Renwick Gallery's 50th Anniversary Campaign.
