= Nadine Kariya =

American jewelry artist

- Born: 1947; Boise, Idaho
- Known for: jewelry artist

Nadine Kariya (born 1947, Boise, Idaho) is an American jewelry artist. She attended the University of Washington.

In 2017 the Bainbridge Island Museum of Art held a retrospective of her work entitled Nadine Kariya: The Hammer and the Peony. Her necklace, Kingfisher Caught Between Man's God and Mother Nature, was acquired by the Smithsonian American Art Museum as part of the Renwick Gallery's 50th Anniversary Campaign.
