= Eugenie Fish Glaman =

American artist

- Born: 1873; St. Joseph, Missouri, US
- Died: 1956 (aged 82–83); Chicago, Illinois, US

Eugenie Fish Glaman (1873 – 1956) was an American artist. She attended the School of the Art Institute of Chicago. She often depicted animals specifically sheep.

== Collections ==
- Art Institute of Chicago
- Gilcrease Museum
- Metropolitan Museum of Art, New York
- New Mexico Museum of Art
- Smithsonian American Art Museum

== Gallery ==
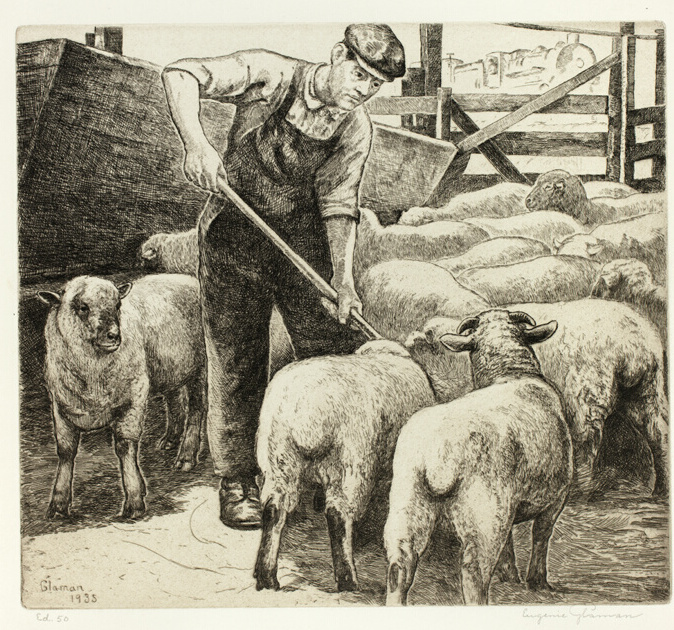
Feeding Pen, 1935

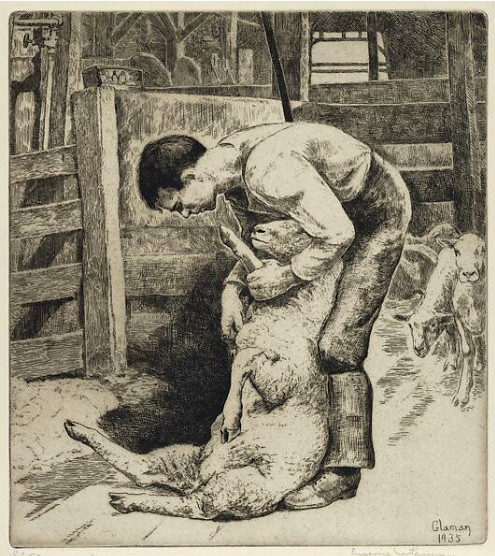
The Shearer, 1935
