= Tara Bryan =

Canadian painter and book artist

- Born: Tara Tidwell; October 14, 1953; Cuero, Texas
- Died: September 29, 2020 (aged 66)
- Known for: Painter, Book artist
- Elected: Royal Canadian Academy of Arts (2012)
- Website: tarabryan.com

Tara Bryan RCA (1953-2020) was an American-born Canadian artist known for her landscape paintings and artist books.

== Early life and education ==
Bryan née Tidwell was born in Cuero, Texas on October 14, 1953. She studied Music Theory and Composition at the University of New Mexico (1975) and received her MFA from the University of Wisconsin–Madison in 1987. In 1992 Bryan moved to Newfoundland.

== Career ==
Bryan created several paintings of icebergs. One of those images was recreated as a mural on the facade of St. John's Convention Centre.

Bryan's artist book Making Bread (not bombs) is included in the al Mutanabbi Street Coalition project.

In 2010 Bryan was a recipient of a Long Haul Award from the Visual Artists Newfoundland and Labrador-CARFAC. In 2021 the same organization posthumously awarded her the Endurance Award. She was elected to the Royal Canadian Academy of Arts in 2012.

Her work is in the Victoria and Albert Museum and the National Museum of Women in the Arts.

Bryan published under the imprint walking bird press. Her work in paintings are represented by Christina Parker Gallery.

Bryan died on September 29, 2020. From June 25–October 2, 2022 The Rooms Provincial Art Gallery featured a selection of her work in a memorial show title Unfolding Horizon.
