= Olive Susanna DeLuce =

American painter 1883 -1978

- Born: July 27, 1888; Owego, New York
- Died: February 22, 1970 (aged 81); Liberty, Missouri
- Known for: Painting

Olive Susanna DeLuce (1888-1970) was an American artist and educator.

DeLuce was born on July 27, 1888 in Owego, New York. She attended Teachers College, Columbia University.

She taught at the Fifth District Normal School in Maryville, Missouri (now Northwest Missouri State College) where she established the fine arts department. She retired in 1958 and the college named the Fine Arts Building for her.

DeLuce died on February 22, 1970 in Liberty, Missouri.
