= Marianne Saxl-Deutsch =

Austrian artist (1885–1942)

- Born: August 28, 1885; Vienna, Austria
- Died: May 26, 1942 (aged 56); Maly Trostenets, Belarus

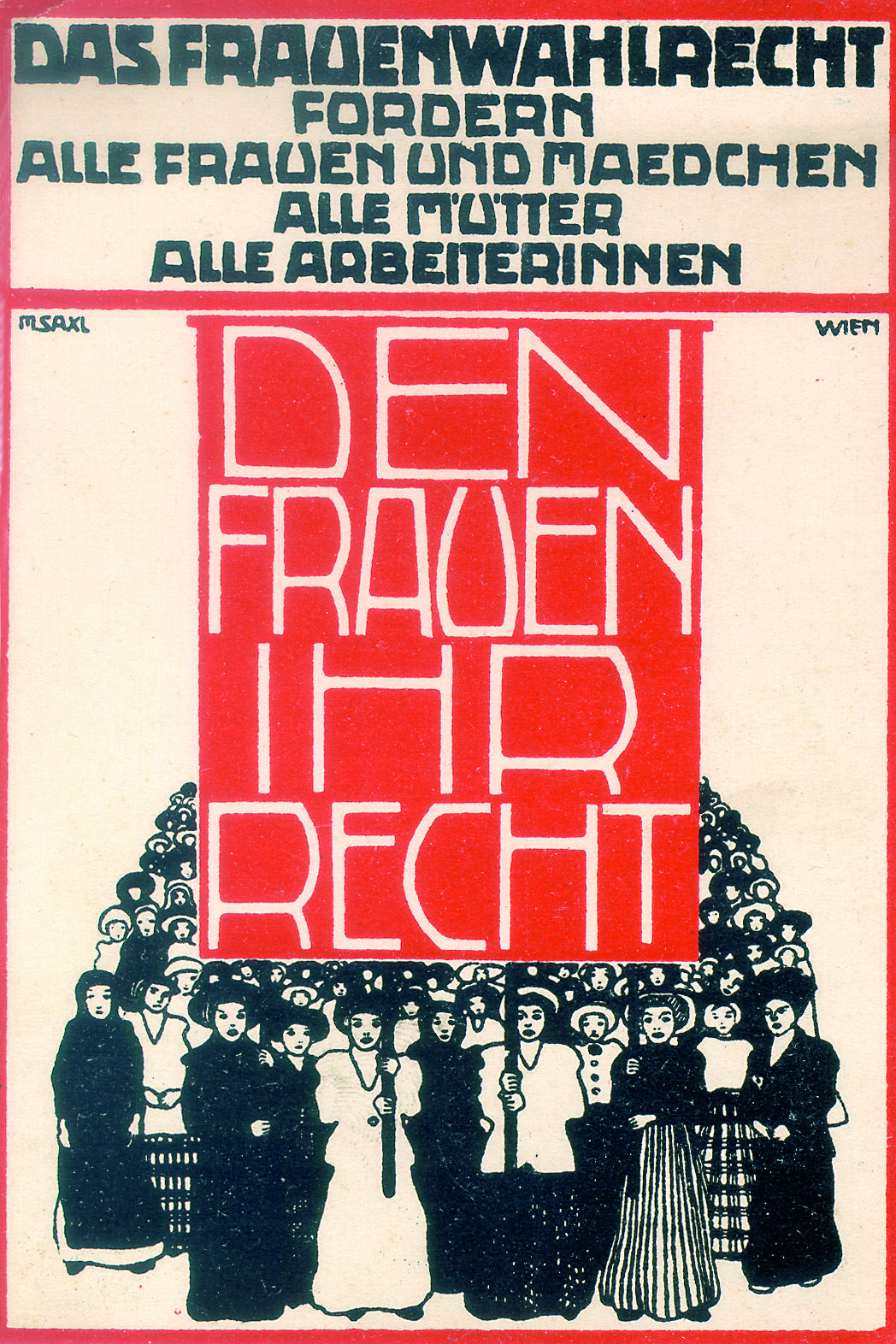

Marianne Saxl-Deutsch (1885 – 1942) was an Austrian artist. She was born in Vienna, Austria on August 28, 1885 in a Jewish family. She studued at Kunstschule für Frauen und Mädchen (Art School for Women and Young Women). She designed the cover for the pamphlet Den Frauen ihr Recht (Women's Rights), which was published in 1913. She died at Maly Trostenets concentration camp on May 26, 1942.

Her work is in the collection of the Leopold Museum in Vienna,
