= Margaret Philbrick =

American artist (1914–1999)

Margaret Elder Philbrick (1914–1999) was an American artist known for her etchings and prints. Born in Northampton, Massachusetts, she was the wife of fellow artist Otis Philbrick. She was a member of the Society of American Etchers.

Her work is in the Brooklyn Museum, Harvard Art Museums, the Metropolitan Museum of Art, the National Gallery of Art, the National Museum of Women in the Arts, and the Virginia Museum of Fine Arts.
