= Priya Pereira (artist) =

Indian artist

- Born: 1967
- Other names: Pixie
- Known for: book artist
- Website: www.pixiebks.com

Priya Pereira (b. 1967) is an Indian artist and co-founder of Pixie Bks in Mumbai, India. She has been described as "India's only book artist".

Pereira studied at Maharaja Sayajirao University of Baroda. In 1993 she co-founded Pixie Bks along with Tony Pereira to publish the books. Her work is in the Metropolitan Museum of Art, the Victoria and Albert Museum, as well as the National Museum of Women in the Arts.

In 2016 the National Museum of Women in the Arts held an exhibition of her work entitled Priya Pereira: Contemporary Books From India at their library. In 2018 Pereira presented a TEDx talk entitled "Don't go by the book". She is on the International Council of the Center for Book Arts in New York.
