= Leatrice Rose =

American painter (1924–2014)

- Born: 1924
- Died: 2014 (aged 89–90)
- Known for: Painting

Leatrice Rose (1924–2014) was an American painter.

Born in New York City in 1924, Rose graduated from Cooper Union in 1945. Her work was included in the 1950 Annual Exhibition of Contemporary American Painting at the Whitney Museum of American Art. Her work was also included in the 2003 exhibition Walking through Challenging Tradition: Women of the Academy, 1826-2003 at the National Academy of Design. She died in 2014.

Her work is in the Metropolitan Museum of Art and the Syracuse University Museum of Art.
