= Armanda Passos =

Portuguese painter (1944–2021)

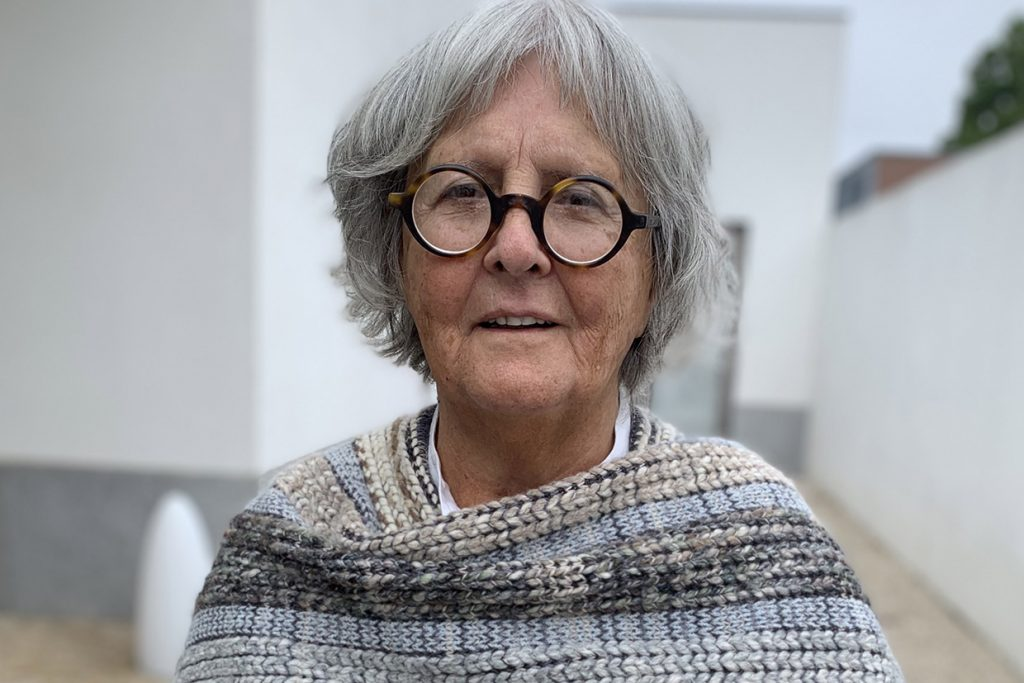
- Born: February 17, 1944; Freguesia de Peso da Régua
- Died: October 19, 2021 (aged 77); Porto
- Known for: Painting

Armanda Passos (1944–2021) was a Portuguese painter.

Passos was born on February 17, 1944 in Peso da Régua, Portugal. She studied at the Escola Superior de Belas-Artes do Porto (Porto School of Fine Arts). She taught printmaking (screen printing and engraving). She was awarded the Comendadora da Ordem do Mérito ( Portuguese Commendation of the Order of Merit) in 2012.

Passos died on October 19, 2021 in Porto, Portugal.

In 2022 the Champalimaud Foundation Exhibition Centre, in Lisbon held a retrospective of her work. Her work is in the collection of the University of Porto.
