= Maria G. Pisano =

American book artist

- Known for: Book artist
- Website: mariagpisano.com

Maria G. Pisano (born 1952) is an American book artist and educator.

Her books have been exhibited at the Minnesota Center for Book Arts Prize contests. Three of her books are in the United States National Library of Medicine: Caudex Folium, Fractured: Covid 19 – Memento Mori vs. Memento Vivere, and Hecatombe 9-11. Her work is in the Dorothy Stimson Bullitt Library at the Seattle Art Museum, the Rhode Island School of Design library, and the Walker Art Center. She has taught workshops, written articles and curated exhibitions on artists books. In 2021 she curated the exhibition Crossroads: Book Artists’ Impassioned Responses to Immigration, Human Rights and Our Environment at the Hunterdon Art Museum
