= Carol Schwartzott =

American artist

Carol Schwartzott (born 1945, New York City) is an American book artist. Her work is in the National Museum of Women in the Arts (NMWA), Rutgers University Special Collections, the Smithsonian American Art Museum, the University of Puget Sound Collins Library, the University of Louisville, the University of Southern California Special Collections, the University of Wisconsin–Madison, and the Walker Art Center.

Schwartzott's work was included in the 1994 exhibition Inky Fingers at the Center for Book Arts, as well as the online exhibition The Book as Art: Accordion Adaptations at NMWA.
