= Agnes Lowrie =

British American artist (1892-1964)

- Born: Agnes Squire Potter; 1892; London, England
- Died: 1964 (aged 71–72)

Agnes Lowrie (1892–1964) was a British born American landscape artist.

== Biography ==
Lowrie was born on October 31, 1892, in London, England. She exhibited her work under several names including Agnes Potter van Ryn and Agnes Squire Potter. Lowrie had a career as a commercial artist in Illinois and Ohio. Her work was included in the 1952 Annual Exhibition of Contemporary American Sculpture, Watercolors and Drawings at the Whitney Museum of American Art.

Lowrie died in 1964.

Her work is in the Cincinnati Art Museum, Harvard Art Museums, and the National Gallery of Art.
