= Debra Weier =

American printmaker and book artist

- Born: 1954; West Bend, Wisconsin
- Known for: book artist, printmaker
- Website: debraweier.com

Debra Weier (born 1954, West Bend, Wisconsin) is an American printmaker, book artist, and installation artist. She attended the University of Wisconsin-Madison. In 1986 she held a residency at the Women's Studio Workshop. Her work is in the Brooklyn Museum, the Metropolitan Museum of Art, the Museum of Fine Arts, Houston, the National Museum of Women in the Arts, the Smithsonian American Art Museum, the Victoria and Albert Museum, and the University of Louisville Library.
