= Vivian Wang =

Chinese born American glass sculptor

- Born: 1945; Shanghai, China
- Known for: Glass sculptor
- Website: vivianwangsculpture.com

Vivian Wang (born 1945, Shanghai, China) is an artist known for her glass sculptures. Wang began her career as a fashion designer in New York City. She transitioned to sculpture after seeing the work of Akio Takamori. Her work is in the Barry Art Museum in Norfolk, Virginia, the Fort Wayne Museum of Art, and the Imagine Museum in St. Petersburg, Florida,

Her work, Shanghai Tiger, was acquired by the Smithsonian American Art Museum as part of the Renwick Gallery's 50th Anniversary Campaign.
