= Loraine Moore =

American printmaker

Loraine Elizabeth Moore (1911 – 1988) was an American printmaker. Her artistic career lasted more than 50 years.

Moore studied printmaking at Oklahoma Agricultural and Mechanical College with Doel Reed and trained under the painter and muralist Xavier Gonzalez at Portland Art Museum. Moore was one of the ten artists selected to represent Oklahoma at the 1938 World's Fair, appearing there again in 1968.

== Works ==
Her work is included in various collections including the Dallas Museum of Art, the Seattle Art Museum, and the National Gallery of Art,
