= Maria Luiko =

German artist (1904–1941)

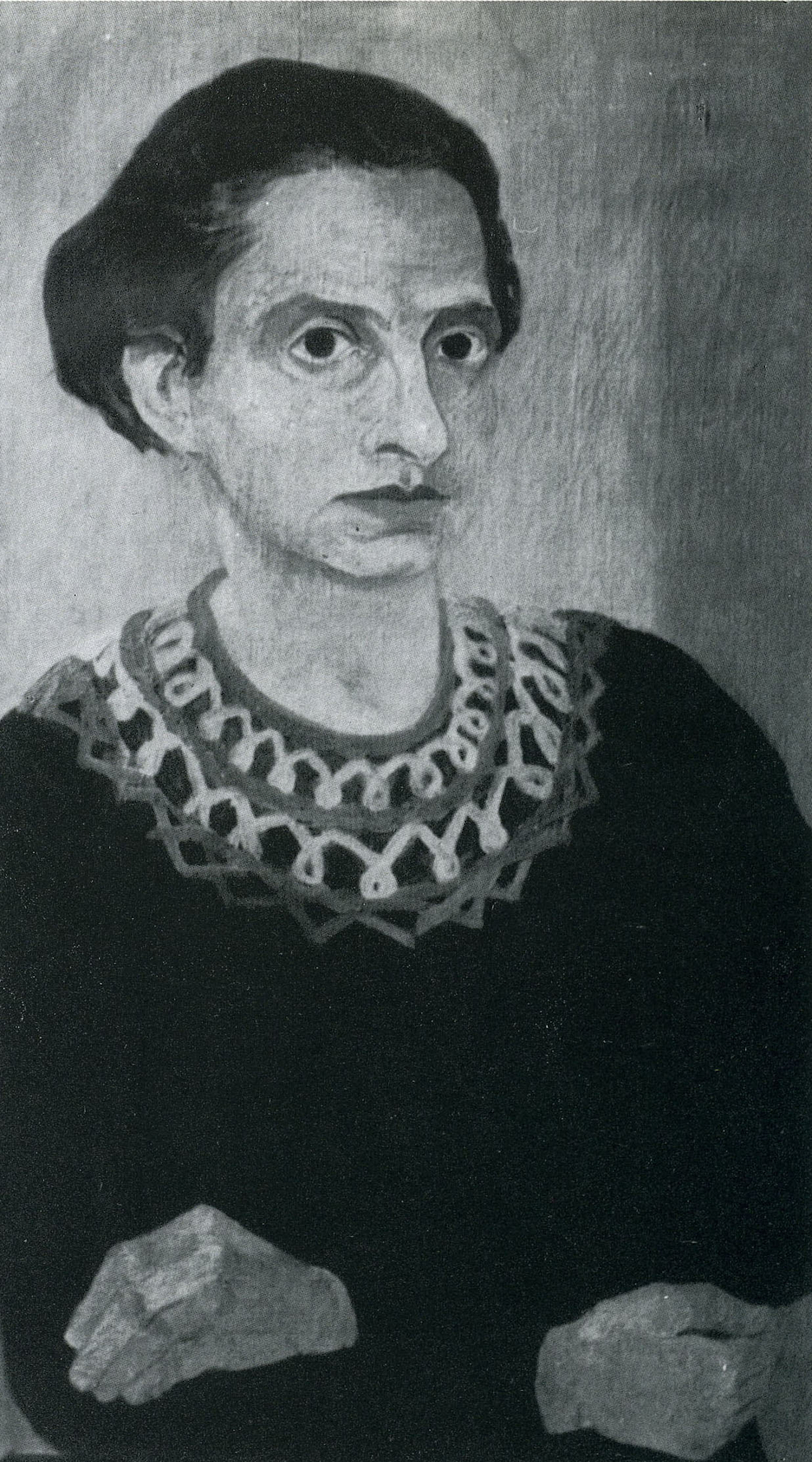
- Born: Marie Luise Kohn; January 25, 1904; Munich, Germany
- Died: November 25, 1941 (aged 37); Kaunas, Lithuania

Maria Luiko (1904–1941) was a German artist known for her Prints, watercolors and paintings.

Luiko was born on January 25, 1904, in Munich, Germany. She studied at the Academy of Fine Arts, Munich, and the Munich School of Applied Arts. Her career was derailed by the antisemitic policies of the Nazi. She was not allowed to join the Reichskammer der bildenden Künste. She then founded the Munich Puppet Theatre for Jewish Artists, where she designed and made puppets. By 1939 Luiko, along with her sister and mother were moved to a "Judenhaus" (Jewish House). In 1941, the three were deported to Kaunas, Lithuania where they were murdered in November.

Luiko died on November 25, 1941, in Kaunas.

In 2007 an exhibition of her work, entitled Grafiken und Figuren was held at the Study Room of the Jewish Museum Munich (Jüdisches Museum München).

In 2021 a stolperstein in her honor was installed at Loristraße 7, 80335 Munich.
