= Carol Rosen =

American artist

Carol Rosen (1933–2014) was an American artist known for her sculpture, collage and book art.

Rosen née de Sola Mendes was born in 1933 in New York City. She attended Hunter College and went on to teach art in West Orange, New Jersey for 25 years before turning to creating art full time. Her work included handmade paper, photo collages, and sculpture. She was inspired by family, found objects, and often explored themes of death in her work. She died on April 8, 2014.

In her later life, she devoted much of her time assembling artist books, collages, sculptures and etchings in stone of collages, focused on the Holocaust. In speaking about her artist books, she wrote, “There is no way to recreate the events or the severe psychological destructiveness of the Holocaust experience by those who were not its victims. One can only approximate the truth by implying the isolation, state of fear, uncertainty, and disorientation which were their constant companions. The ‘truth’ of the images in these prints depends on creating a narrative situation or one which attempts to mirror the psychological state of mind.”

Her work is in the collection of the Graphic Arts Collection of the Firestone Library at Princeton University, the Smithsonian American Art Museum, the United States Holocaust Memorial Museum, and the National Museum of Women in the Arts.
