= Isabelle Greenberger =

American artist

- Born: 1911
- Died: 1997 (aged 85–86)
- Known for: Printmaking

Isabelle Greenberger (1911 – 1997) was an American artist known for her prints created for the Works Progress Administration (WPA). Her work was included in the 1988 exhibition Women Artists of the New Deal Era at the National Museum of Women in the Arts.

Her work is in the collection of the Baltimore Museum of Art, the Library of Congress, the Metropolitan Museum of Art, the National Gallery of Art, the Pennsylvania Academy of the Fine Arts, and the Smithsonian American Art Museum.

== Gallery ==
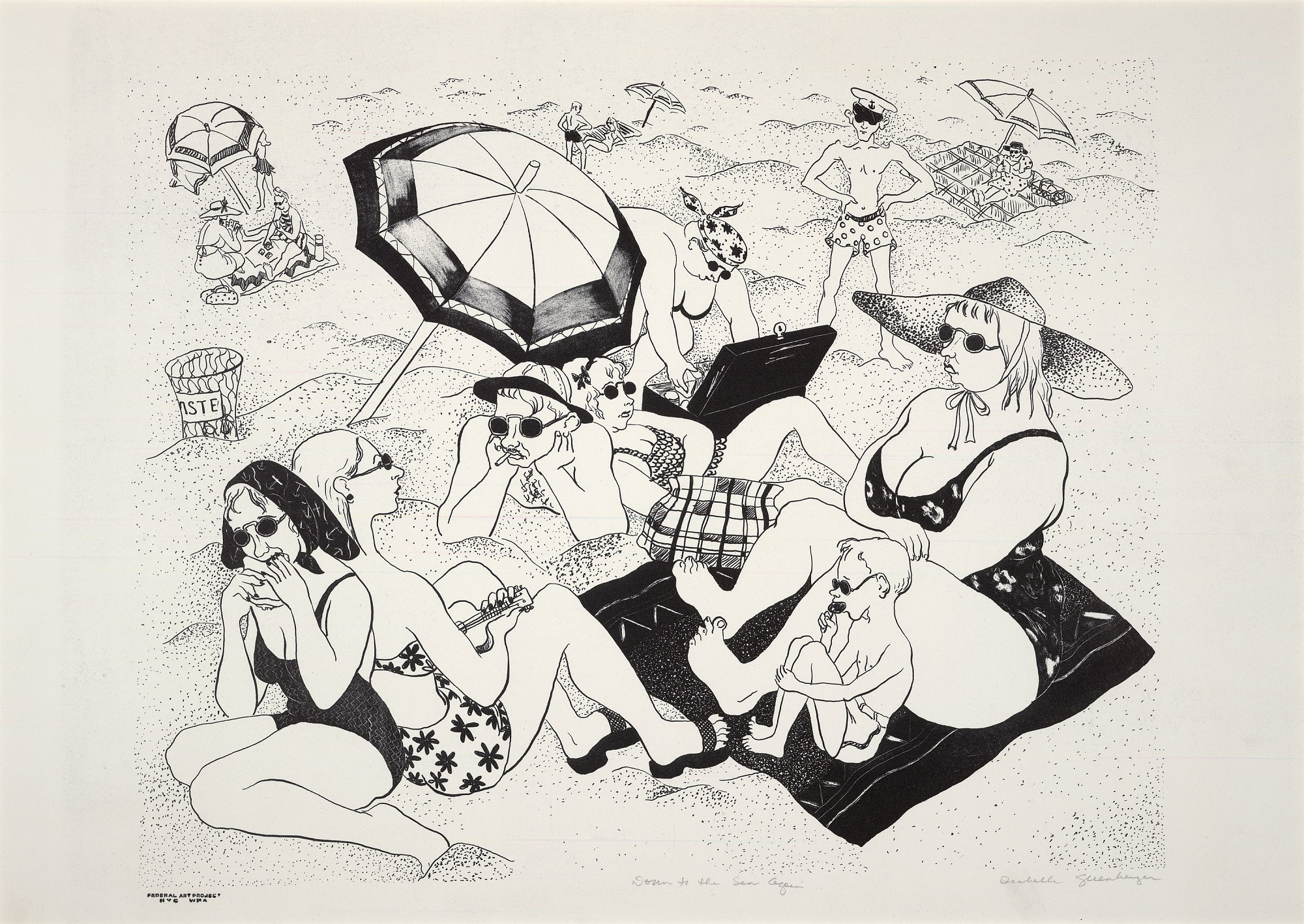
Down to the Sea Again, ca.1935

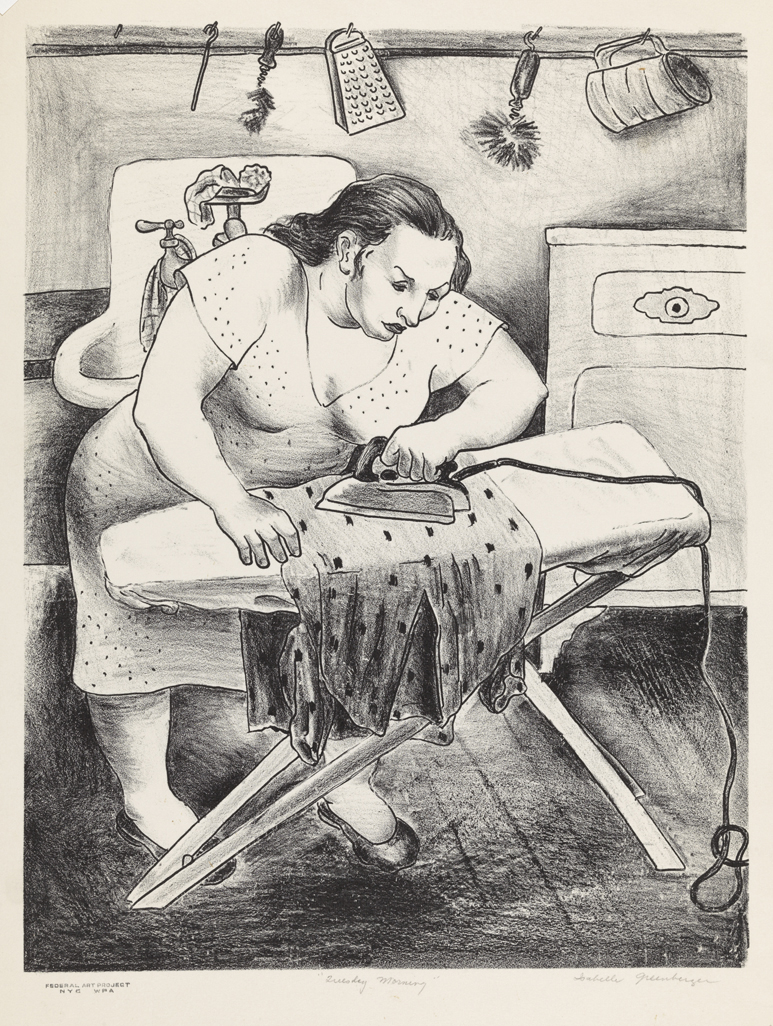
Tuesday Morning, 1936-39

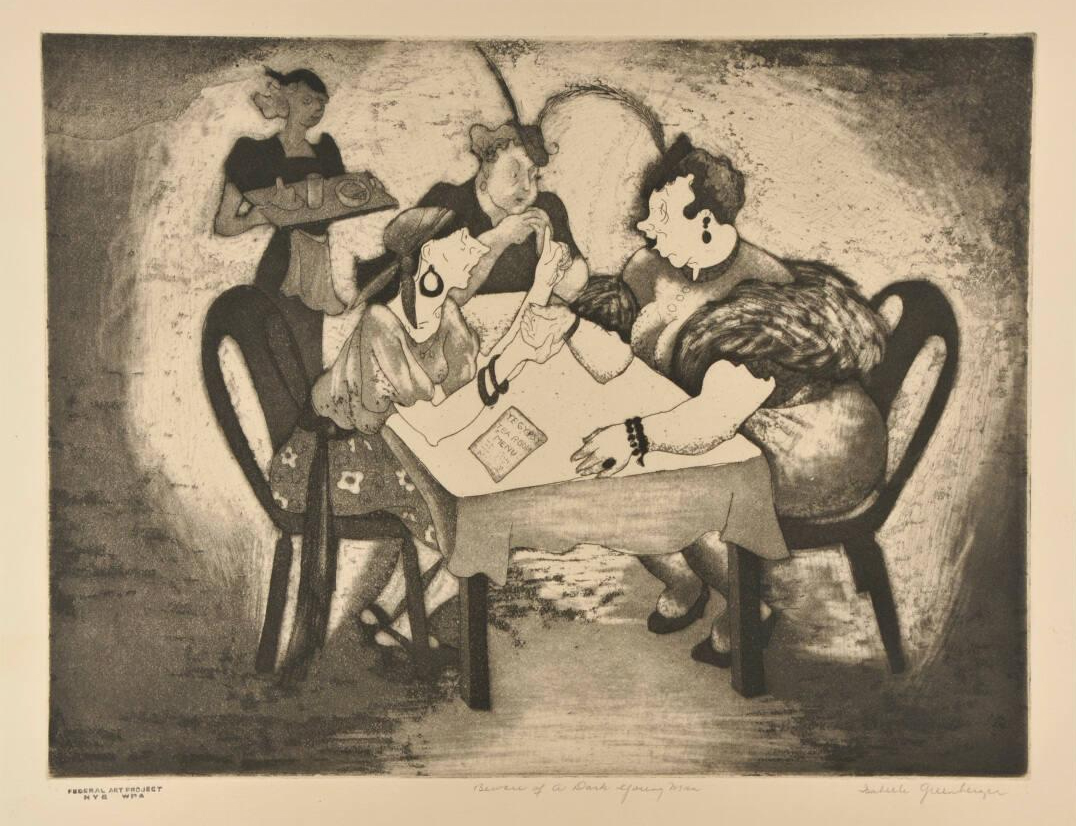
Beware of a Dark Young Man, c. 1935-1939
