= Julie Anne Mihalisin =

American jewellery artist (born 1962)

- Born: 1962 (age 63–64); Gainesville, Florida
- Occupation: Jewellery artist

Julie Anne Mihalisin (born 1962) is an American jewellery artist. Mihalisin was born in Gainesville, Florida in 1962. She attended Tyler School of Art and Architecture and the Royal College of Art. Her work is included in the collections of the Smithsonian American Art Museum, the Cooper Hewitt, Smithsonian Design Museum, the Corning Museum of Glass and the Museum of Arts and Design. Her piece, Untitled Brooch, was acquired by the Smithsonian American Art Museum as part of the Renwick Gallery's 50th Anniversary Campaign.
