= April Vollmer =

American artist

April Vollmer (born 1951) is an American artist and educator known for her printmaking and book art.

== Early life and education ==
Vollmer attended Hunter College and specializes in mokuhanga woodblock printing.

== Career ==
In 1993 Vollmer was the recipient of a MacDowell fellowship. She is the author of the book Japanese Woodblock Printing Workshop published in 2015.

Vollmer's work is in the Blanton Museum of Art. Her artist's book Pests of Public Importance is in the National Museum of Women in the Arts (NMWA).
