= Christine Kermaire =

Belgian artist

Christine Kermaire (b. 1953) is a Belgian book artist. Her work is in many museums and libraries including the Barcelona Museum of Contemporary Art, the Centre de la Gravure et de l’Image imprimée, the Crossett Library at Bennington College, the Emily Carr University of Art and Design library, the Fine Arts Library of Harvard University, the MassArt Library, Michigan State University library, the Minneapolis Institute of Art, The New School, the Fleet library at the Rhode Island School of Design, the art library at the University of Louisville, the University of Michigan Library, the University of Tulsa library, the library of the University of Wisconsin–Madison and the National Museum of Women in the Arts
