= Virginia Dotson =

American woodworker

- Born: 1943; Newton, Massachusetts
- Known for: woodworker

Virginia Dotson (b. 1943 Newton, Massachusetts) is an American artist known for her woodworking. Her work is in the collection of The Center for Art in Wood the Minneapolis Institute of Art the Museum of Fine Arts, Houston, and the Smithsonian American Art Museum. Her work, Wood Bowl, was acquired by the Smithsonian American Art Museum as part of the Renwick Gallery's 50th Anniversary Campaign.
