= Gitte Hähner-Springmühl =

German painter and musician (born 1951)

Gitte Hähner-Springmühl (born 9 October 1951 as Brigitte Springmühl in Zwickau) is a German painter, graphic artist and musician who was part of the independent art scene of the GDR in Chemnitz (Karl-Marx-Stadt) from the 1980s onwards. (Karl-Marx-Stadt) from the 1980s.

== Life ==
Brigitte Springmühl, also known as Gitte Springmühl, later known as Gitte Hähner-Springmühl, initially studied concert guitar for six years at the Robert-Schumann-Konservatorium Zwickau before moving to Karl-Marx-Stadt, now Chemnitz, in 1971. In 1973, she married the artist Klaus Hähner-Springmühl, who had a strong influence on the young art scene in Karl-Marx-Stadt. She had studied literature and librarianship in Leipzig, but then pursued various activities.

From around 1978, she produced her first autodidactic drawings and paintings on literature, e.g. on the schizophrenic poet Ernst Herbeck. Although she divorced in 1979, she worked with Klaus Hähner-Springmühl on actions, performances and free improvisational music, including in the formation Kartoffelschälmaschine. This took place on location in private studios (Hinterhof Richterstraße 9) and the few apartment galleries such as Galerie Oben or EIGEN+ART (Gerd Harry Lybke). The alternative art scene was under observation by Informelle Mitarbeiter, also from the scene itself, the Ministry for State Security, including Gitte Hähner-Springmühl.

In 1989, she published 31 copies of the artist's book Obdachlosen-Zone 1 with texts and 17 partly hand-colored serigraphs.

== Exhibitions and projects ==
She had her first solo exhibition in 1988 at Galerie Hermannstrasse in Chemnitz, followed by others in private galleries. The art scene in Chemnitz attracted attention in West Germany and her works were shown in the exhibition Neuerdings Chemnitz in Munich in 1990. From 1991 to 1993, she worked intensively on the theme "Underflight - Overflight", which was also the title of an exhibition in 1995 at the Städtisches Museum Zwickau and the Galerie Oben in Chemnitz. In 1999 and 2000 she realized the Land Art projects "Seh-Zeichen I + II" at the ART Galerie Scheel, Morsum (Sylt).

In 2003 she founded the private art and music school refugia in Chemnitz. Her last major group exhibition was the "Kunstbad Keitum" organized on Sylt in 2005.

== Literature ==
- Neuerdings Chemnitz. 11 portraits of artists. (Catalog for the exhibition from November 27 to December 9, 1990, at the Galerie auf der Praterinsel, Munich). Munich 1990, ISBN 3-927743-02-X, pp. 66–77.
- Gitte Hähner-Springmühl - Unterflug, Überflug. Pictures and drawings. (The catalog is published on the occasion of the exhibitions in the Städtisches Museum Zwickau, 12 March to 23 April 1995 and in the Galerie Oben, Chemnitz, 28 June to 29 July 1995). Städtisches Museum Zwickau 1995, ISBN 3-9803420-3-4 (54 p.).
