= Annemirl Bauer =

German artist

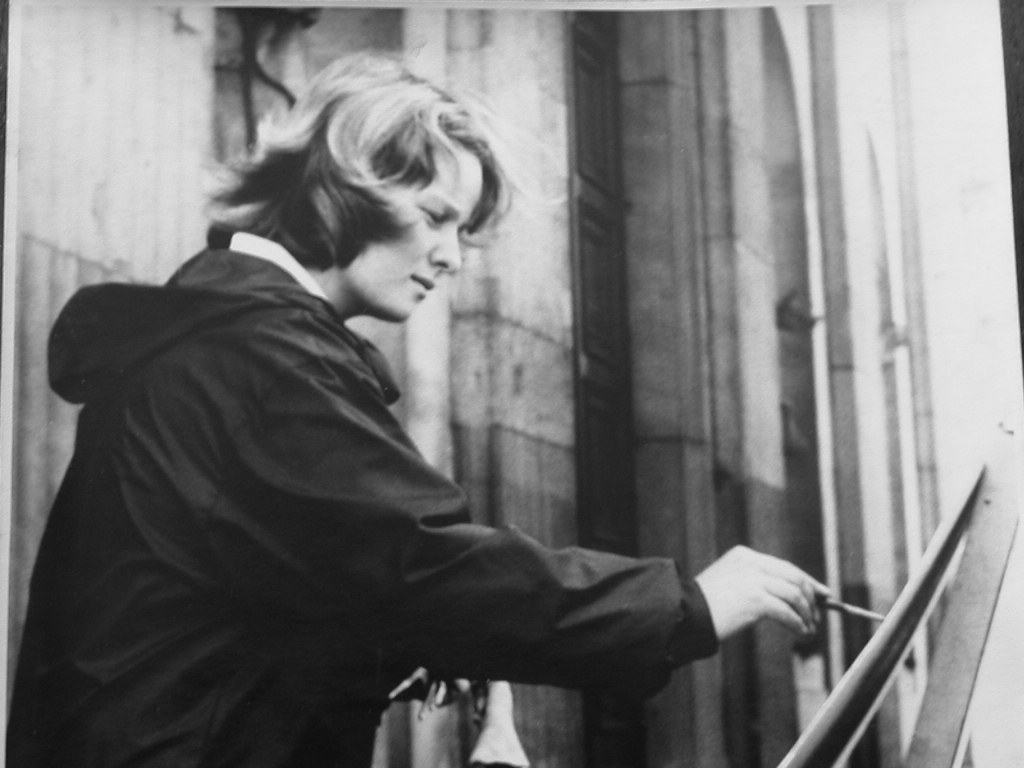
- Born: 10 April 1939; Jena, Germany
- Died: 23 August 1989 (aged 50); Berlin, Germany
- Known for: Painting
- Website: annemirlbauer.de

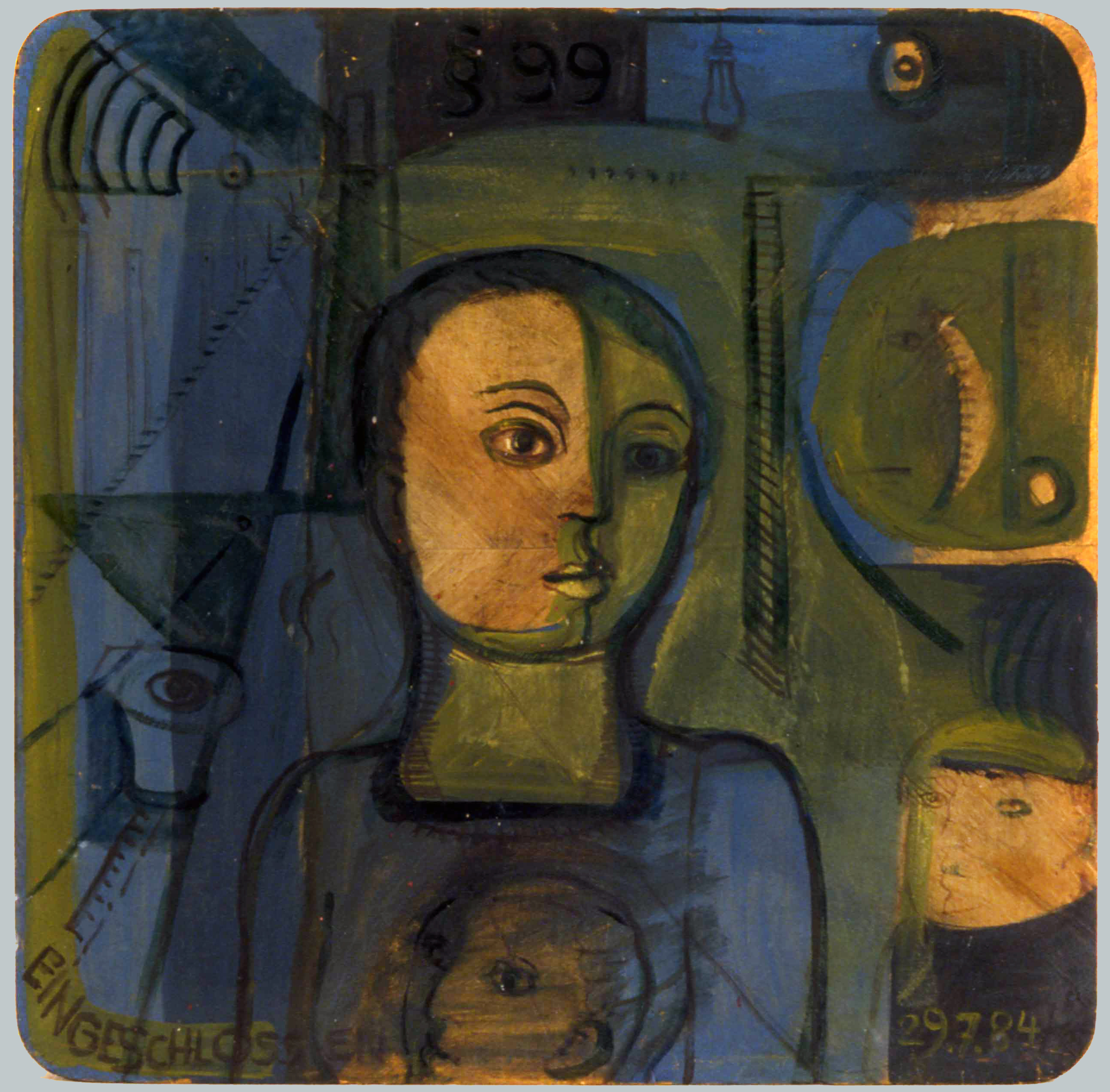
Bohley Eingeschlossene

Annemirl Bauer (1939-1989) was an East German painter.

== Biography ==
Bauer was born in Jena on 10 April 1939. She studied at the Akademie der Bildenden Künste (Dresden). She was a prolific artist, and also a vocal critic of the GDR on the issue of conscription of women and restriction of travel into West Germany. Her political stance resulted in her expulsion from the East German Verband Bildender Künstler (Association of Visual Artists).

Bauer died in Berlin on 23 August 1989.

In 2010 a park in Berlin, Annemirl-Bauer-Platz, was named in her honor.

In 2019 her work was included in the exhibit The Medea Insurrection: Radical Women Artists Behind the Iron Curtain at Wende Museum in Culver City, California.
