= Lena Gurr =

American painter (1897–1992)

- At work in her Paris studio, around 1930
- Born: October 27, 1897; Brooklyn, New York, U.S.
- Died: February 19, 1992 (aged 94); Brooklyn, New York, U.S.
- Spouse: Joseph Biel

Lena Gurr (1897–1992), was an American artist who made paintings, prints, and drawings showing, as one critic said, "the joys and sorrows of everyday life." Another critic noted that her still lifes, city scenes, and depictions of vacation locales were imbued with "quiet humor," while her portrayal of slum-dwellers and the victims of warfare revealed a "ready sympathy" for victims of social injustice at home and of warfare abroad. During Gurr's compositions retained emotional content as they evolved from a naturalistic to a semi-abstract cubist style. Discussing this trend, she once told an interviewer that as her work tended toward increasing abstraction she believed it nonetheless "must have some kind of human depth to it." Born into a Russian-Jewish immigrant family, she was the wife of Joseph Biel, also Russian-Jewish and an artist of similar sensibility.

== Art training ==
Gurr began studying art at a young age. She was a member of the art club of her high school years and she studied art as a component of the teacher training she subsequently received. In 1919 she studied painting and printmaking at the Educational Alliance Art School (Note: The Educational Alliance is a charitable organization that offers social service programs to poor residents of New York City. It was founded on the Lower East Side of Manhattan in 1889 as a settlement house for East European Jews. In 1895 Henry McBride, who would later become well known as an art critic for the New York Sun, informally began a program of art classes there. Originally having only two pupils who met twice a week in the evening, the classes evolved into an independent art school in 1917 and, by the time Gurr attended, it offered both day and evening classes to large numbers of students.) and between 1920 and 1922 she won a scholarship to attend the Art Students League where she took classes with John Sloan and Maurice Sterne.

== Artistic career ==
Lena Gurr, "Refreshment Stand," c. 1930, oil on canvas, 30 1/8 in × 20 in (77 cm × 51 cm)

Lena Gurr, "Bride to Be," 1940, serigraph, 15 in × 19 in (38 cm × 48 cm)

Lena Gurr, "New York Gothic," 1940, oil on masonite, 48 in × 36 in (122 cm × 91 cm)

In 1926 and 1928 Gurr participated in group shows at the Whitney Studio Club in Greenwich Village (Note: The Whitney Studio Club was a project of the collector, sculptor, and philanthropist Gertrude Vanderbilt Whitney. With the goal of supporting them, she both purchased and publicly displayed the work of living American artists. Beginning in 1907, she used her own studio as a public gallery and in 1918 opened the Whitney Studio Club gallery on West 4th Street in Greenwich Village. In 1931 she and her husband expanded the gallery into the Whitney Museum of American Art.) and in 1928 she also participated in the 12th annual exhibition of the Society of Independent Artists at the Waldorf Roof in New York. (Note: The Society of Independent Artists frequently held exhibitions at the Waldorf Room. Reviewing this show, Helen Appleton Read, the critic for the Brooklyn Daily Eagle, said "I made three discoveries on my first visit...they are Thomas Nagal "Tea", Eugenie McEvoy "Lenox 2300" and Lena Gurr with two figure compositions which have something of Marie Laurencin's or Helene Perdriat's quality of naive sophistication." The Waldorf Roof was a set of rooms on the top floor of the Waldorf Astoria Hotel, one of which had glass sides and a glass roof. The rooms were used for concerts, dances, benefits, and exhibitions.) From 1929 to 1931 Gurr took a leave of absence from her teaching position to travel in France with Joseph Biel, an artist whom she had met while studying at the Art Students League. They spent time in Nice and Mentone but mainly in Paris.

During the early months of 1931, while she was still abroad, her work appeared in group exhibitions held at the R. H. Macy department store and the Opportunity Gallery. (Note: In 1931, the Macy department store, which had held art exhibits during the 1920s, opened new galleries for displaying the work of young American artists, such as Gurr, who had previously exhibited little or nothing. A group of collectors along with the artist Gifford Beal set up the nonprofit Opportunity Gallery in the fall of 1927. Like Macy's Gallery, it provided new artists with a place to show their work.) Gurr's contributions to these shows drew the attention of two critics from the New York Times, one of whom said she appeared to abandon herself to the rich beauty of her medium and the other that her still lifes were excellent. In 1932 she participated in three shows: a solo exhibition at the Brooklyn Museum, an annual exhibition of the New York Society of Women Artists, (Note: The New York Society of Women Artists was founded in 1926 as an alternative to the National Association of Women Painters and Sculptors (which was believed to be too traditional and academic). It aimed to show art that was both innovative and not overly feminine. Its first president was Marguerite Zorach. Founding members included Agnes Weinrich, Anne Goldthwaite, Blanche Lazzell, Henrietta Shore, Louise Upton Brumback, Margaret Wendell Huntington, Marjorie Organ, and Sonia Gordon Brown.) and a group exhibition at the G.R.D. Studio. Of the G.R.D. show, Margaret Breuning, critic for the New York Post, said she appeared to be an artist of considerable experience capable of producing a "complex pattern of planes with nonchalant facility." (Note: Like the Opportunity Gallery, the G.R.D. Studio was a non-commercial venture sponsored by patrons and charging no commissions to the young artists whose work it showed. It was founded in 1928 as a memorial to Gladys Roosevelt Dick by her sister, Mrs. Philip J. Roosevelt.)

Her work drew critical attention three years later when, commencing what proved to be a long and productive relationship, she made her first appearance at the A.C.A. Gallery. (Note: The A.C.A. Gallery was founded in 1932 by Herman Baron and the artists Stuart Davis, Adolf Dehn, and Yasuo Kuniyoshi. Oriented toward American contemporary art, it had a distinctive left-wing point of view and its exhibitions tended to display works of social conscience. In the early 1940s, it was the first gallery to show silkscreen prints using the technique developed by Harry Gottlieb) Although Howard Devree, critic for the New York Times, praised in general terms the paintings she contributed to this show, he was more explicit in discussing a solo exhibition that the same gallery gave her later in the year. He said some of her work in the solo show tended toward caricature, but most of it was bold and forthright: "She turns out a piquant bit of social satire, an accomplished still-life with warmth of color and with finish, or a romantic landscape."

In 1936 Gurr joined National Association of Women Painters and Sculptors. During 1936, 1937, and 1938 she participated in group shows of the Salons of America (1936), (Note: Salons of America was an organization founded in 1922 by Hamilton Easter Field in opposition to the Society of Independent Artists. Field was president. Members included Oscar Bluemner, George Luks, Rockwell Kent, and Stefan Hirsch.) the American Artists School (1936 and 1937), (Note: Gurr participated in the American Artists School exhibition as an art instructor belonging to Local 5 of the city's Teachers Union. The show contained works by Gurr and five other members of the Artists Union. Of her paintings, a New York Times critic said, "Lena Gurr's urban observations have point and fluency." The American Artists School had a radical orientation similar to that of the A.C.A. Gallery. Begun in 1936 as a successor to the John Reed Club School of Art, its director was Harry Gottlieb. The secretary was Henry Billings. Arnold Blanch, Lincoln Rothschild, Waylande Gregory, Louis Lozowick, John Cunningham, Alexander Brook, George Picke, H. Glintenkamp, Yasuo Kuniyoshi, Niles Spencer, and Philip Reisman were members of the board. It aimed to educate young workers as to social issues as well as give them rudimentary art training needed to qualify for federal arts programs. It lasted only a few years, during which it held a few exhibitions such as the one in which Gurr participated.) and the Municipal Art Gallery (1936 and 1937), (Note: The Municipal Art Gallery was a public works project established in January 1936 by the Mayor's Municipal Art Committee of New York City. Its director was Mary Breckinridge, the wife of Henry Breckinridge. In the late 1930s the gallery held frequent exhibitions of contemporary American artists.) Her group shows in 1938 included the annual exhibition held by the New York Society of Women Artists, a benefit show called "Roofs for 40 Million" held at Maison Francaise in the new Rockefeller Center, and another benefit show, put on by the Joint Distribution Committee at Studio Guild Galleries. (Note: The Joint Distribution Committee's show raised funds to help Jews who were "victims of the political situation in various parts of Europe.")

Two critics prepared lengthy reviews of a 1938–39 solo exhibition at the A.C.A. Gallery. (Note: Writing in the New York Times, Howard Devree called one of her paintings the best he had seen to date, and Jerome Klein of the New York Post wrote that her paintings made a stronger showing than the ones he had seen before.) Writing in December 1938, the New York Post's Jerome Klein praised Gurr's successful handling of varied subjects (local urban settings, countryside vacations, terror in distant lands) and in January 1939 Howard Devree noted her "capacity for transmuting homely scenes and incidents of every day life into pictures tinged with a kind of romantic realism and with quiet humor." (Note: Klein also said she possessed a "fine sense of the episodic" which did not interfere with "the capacity to build a firm, substantial picture." Devree wrote, "She also sees and portrays the tragedy of the slums or the war-stricken humble folk and a ready sympathy lies behind her work. She can suggest by a small group and their nondescript possessions the whole of a Summer beach without crowding it with writhing figures. Miss Gurr's work is sound and well considered, with a folksy quality that is delightful.") The page on which Devree's review appeared was illustrated by a painting of Gurr's called On the Bridge which was on view in the show.

In the Spring of 1945 the A.C.A. Gallery gave Gurr her third solo exhibition. Reviewing this show, Melville Upton, critic for the New York Sun, saw a steady advance in her painting, noting a pleasing "structure of repeating and contrasting forms" in one picture and a "complicated and fanciful" design in another. In the New York Times, Howard Devree discussed her talent for depicting her subjects feelingly, using as her themes "human relationships and the joys and sorrows of everyday life." Peggy O'Reilly, of the Brooklyn Eagle, quoted Gurr as saying that while her aims were primarily aesthetic, she tried to be "a creature of what's around me." Regarding a painting called Indestructible, Gurr said she "tried to show that no matter how much the world is ravaged, love and art still remain." The Brooklyn Eagle's other critic, A.Z. Kruse, also reviewed this solo exhibition. Saying that Gurr "painted with the gusto of a Goya," he praised her "ability to record the emotional impact of an inspired moment" and noted that she held a secure place" in the "front ranks of outstanding American women painters."

During the following decades, Gurr's work continued to be shown at exhibitions of the National Association of Women Painters and Sculptors, the Brooklyn Society of Artists, the New York Society of Women Artists, and the A.C.A. Gallery. She also showed at the World's Fair (1939), the Metropolitan Museum (1942), (Note: In December 1942 Gurr was one of six school art teachers invited to show work in an exhibition of contemporary American art at the Metropolitan Museum.) the Corcoran Gallery of Art (1944), the Artists League of America (1945), (Note: The Artists League of America exhibition was held at the Riverside Museum. Shortly after the United States entered World War II, a mass meeting in New York of 23 artists' societies (the "Artists' Societies for National Defense") called for the establishment of a group called the Artists' Council for Victory. The council was formed on January 19, 1942, and its executive board subsequently recommended that the Artists Union and the American Artists' Congress be merged to form the Artists League of America. In May of that year the Artists League came into existence.) the National Academy of Design (1946), (Note: The exhibition at the National Academy contained drawings by contemporary American artists. A.Z. Kruse, writing in the Brooklyn Eagle, said that one of Gurr's drawings, On the Home Front, showing a soldier kissing his child that had been born while he was in service, was "understandingly and skilfully rendered with white chalk on black paper...") the Serigraph Society Galleries (1947), (Note: The Serigraph Society show consisted of silkscreen prints. In 1940 Harry Gottlieb showed silkscreen prints at the A.C.A. Gallery and Gurr undoubtedly saw them there. Serigraphy was then a new artistic medium. Anthony Velonis, working with the Public Use of Arts Committee and the United American Artists, is credited with the formation of the Silk Screen Group which later became the National Serigraph Society. In 1945 the National Serigraph Society had moved into new headquarters with permanent gallery space at 38 West 57th Street in New York.) and the American Federation of Arts (1951). (Note: In January 1951 Gurr participated in a traveling exhibition called "The Art of Democratic Living", co-sponsored by the American Federation of Arts and the committee on the art of democratic living of the New York Chapter of the American Jewish Committee. The show opened in New York at Freedom House. Its theme was "the need for democratic living among Americans of different creeds, colors, and ethnic or national origins.") Commenting on her fourth solo exhibition at the A.C.A. Galleries in 1947, Howard Devree said she had produced some of her best work to date and a critic for the Brooklyn Eagle noted her use of stepped up color, dynamic line, and bolder composition and said she "delights in painting impressions of life as she sees it around her." In 1950 she made murals and mobile decorations in the ballroom of Hotel Astor in preparation for a benefit event sponsored by Artists Equity to raise money for ill and destitute artists and in 1952 she became Artists Equity's recording secretary. (Note: An article in the Brooklyn Eagle describing preparations for the costume ball included a photo of Gurr. Formed in 1947, the Artists Equity Association aimed to promote the welfare of American artists and protect their economic interests. Its president was Yasuo Kuniyoshi and its membership included American painters, sculptors, and graphic artists, including Will Barnet, Thomas Hart Benton, Stuart Davis, Arthur Dove, Marsden Hartley, Edward Hopper, Louise Nevelson, and John Sloan.)

During her artistic career, Gurr mostly made easel art in oil and casein and also lithographic and silkscreen prints and some watercolors and drawings. Her subjects included still lifes, city scenes, vacation settings, and depictions of war and persecution. Over the years her technique evolved from representative and semi-abstract toward a more abstract semi-cubist style. Many of her pictures were light-hearted and showed, in the words of one critic, a "quiet humor," while others displayed what another critic called "a ready sympathy" for slum-dwellers and "war-stricken humble folk." (Note: In 1939 Howard Devree wrote that she saw and portrayed the "tragedy of the slums or the war-stricken humble folk" with a ready sympathy.)

During an interview conducted in 1947 she said "It may be social awareness or his personal reaction to nature, an idea, an emotion or an event,.. [but] something more than mere technique should stand out in [the artist's] finished work." And in another interview, three years later, she said her painting style had grown and changed during her career as she herself had grown and changed, but, though her work tended toward increasing abstraction, she insisted that it "must have some kind of human depth to it." In 1959, Stuart Preston, writing in the New York Times, noted that her use of small, flat planes did not prevent her work from displaying liveliness and "an affectionate interest."

Gurr's semi-abstract and semi-cubist works revealed a talent for creative design. Over the course of her career they increasingly showed a lighter tone and what one critic referred to as "stepped up color, dynamic line, bolder composition." In 1950 one critic praised her ability to handle abstraction "in the best modern vein" and a few years later another said she used a style that employed flat planes in a deliberate distortion of reality but her figures and city scenes were nonetheless realistic in nature.

In the 1950s and 1960s she continued to participate in group shows of the National Association of Women Painters and Sculptors (which had renamed itself the National Association of Women Artists in 1941), the Brooklyn Society of Artists, and the A.C.A. Gallery. Thereafter she showed less frequently, and the last exhibition to receive public notice during her lifetime seems to have taken place in 1977.

== Solo exhibitions ==
Gurr was given her first solo exhibition at the Brooklyn Museum in 1932. The A.C.A. Gallery gave her solo exhibitions in 1935, 1938, 1945, and 1947. In 1949 her work appeared in what was billed as a "Joint One-Man Serigraph Show" at the Serigraph Galleries in New York. She subsequently received three more A.C.A. solo shows: in 1950, 1953, and 1959

== Group exhibitions ==
Gurr showed regularly in exhibitions of the National Association of Women Painters and Sculptors, the New York Society of Women Artists, and the Brooklyn Society of Artists. Her principal private gallery was the A.C.A. Gallery. Her work appeared under the auspices of the Whitney Studio Club (1926, 1928), and the Municipal Art Committee (1936, 1937). as well as the Society of Independent Artists (1928), the Artists League of America (1945), the National Academy (1946), and the Corcoran Gallery (1947).

== Awards ==
During her professional career Gurr received awards from the National Association of Women Painters and Sculptors (1937, 1947, 1950, 1954, and 1961), the Brooklyn Society of Artists (1943, 1950, 1951, 1954, and 1955), the National Serigraph Association (1950), and the Silvermine Guild of Artists (1957).

== Memberships ==
Gurr was a member of the American Artists Congress, Artists Equity Association, Artists League of America, Artists Union, Audubon Artists, Brooklyn Society of Artists, National Association of Women Painters and Sculptors, New York Society of Women Artists. and the Society of American Graphic Artists.

== Art teacher ==
After leaving high school in 1915 Gurr enrolled in the Brooklyn Training School for Teachers. She took the one-year program and returned for a third semester, following which, in January 1917, she received a certificate to teach drawing. (Note: Although sources say Gurr studied at the Maxwell Training School for Teachers, the name of the school was the Brooklyn Training School for Teachers during the time she attended.) She began her teaching career in 1918 at a New York elementary school and in 1921 was promoted to teach drawing at the junior high level. She remained a junior high art teacher in city schools until her retirement in 1944. (Note: Her first teaching position was in P.S. 95. This was almost certainly the school at Van Sicklen St. and Neck Road in the Gravesend section of Brooklyn, a school which had been newly built in 1915. Although she generally taught in junior high schools, in 1931 she was listed as received an extension to the sabbatical leave she had been granted from an elementary school in Manhattan.)

In the summer of 1945, Gurr taught in the city's parks in a program sponsored by the Civilian Defense Volunteer Office. (Note: During World War II, the Civilian Defense Volunteer Office of the Office of Civilian Defense encouraged New Yorkers not to travel outside the city during their summer vacations. The "at home vacations" campaign focused on sightseeing, birdwatching, museum-going, and other activities as well as sponsoring art instruction sessions in city parks, such as the ones in which Gurr participated.) Her sessions at the Brooklyn Botanic Garden proved to be a popular part of the program, prompting a reporter from the Brooklyn Daily Eagle to attend one class. "The picture is a creation from your own hand," Gurr told her students, "In your picture you are at liberty to do what you like." She also said that variety in subject matter, center of interest, balance, movement, and design are all elements that are either instinctively known or must be learned. To one student she said, "You'll have to unbalance yourself a bit and then your pictures will be more interesting."

== Personal information ==
Gurr was born in Brooklyn and, apart from brief stays in Manhattan and in Paris, lived there her whole life. Her father was Hyman Gurr and her mother was Ida Gorodnick Gurr. She had two older brothers, Abraham and Samuel, and four younger sisters, Fannie, Jennie, Celia, and Martha. (Note: When the 1910 U.S. Census was taken, Abraham was 16, Samuel 14, Lena 12, Fannie 10, Jennie 8, Celia, 6, and Martha 3.) Both parents had immigrated to New York from Russia, Hyman in 1891 (Note: His parents were Joseph Gurr and Anna Silver Gurr, both Russians. In 1910 he was not yet a naturalized citizen (listed as alien) and could read and write in Yiddish, but had not learned to speak English.) and Ida in 1893. Hyman and Ida were married in the United States. (Note: In 1910 they had been married 23 years.) In 1910 Lena, Jennie, Fannie, and Celia were in school and Samuel was in school but also earning money in the tin toy trade. Abraham was living with the rest of the family, earning money as a fitter of gas fixtures. Hyman was employed in the dressmaking trade. (Note: He and his sons were all wage earners meaning, presumably, that they were employed outside the home.) In 1910 the family lived in a rented apartment at 55 Seigel Street in the Williamsburg section of Brooklyn. (Note: Their neighbors were almost all Russian immigrants who, like themselves, spoke Yiddish.)

Gurr attended Eastern District High School, where she participated in the art club, spoke in school assemblies, worked on the literary monthly, and was elected vice-president of the senior class. (Note: The literary monthly, called The Daisy, contained short stories, poems, cartoons, and news reports of school activities.) After graduating in 1915, she studied at the Brooklyn Training School for Teachers and, having attended for an extra semester in the fall of 1917, earned her certificate as a drawing teacher. (Note: The Brooklyn Training School for Teachers was a public school established by the Brooklyn Board of Education in 1885. A few years later, after Brooklyn became part of New York City, the school was taken over by the city's new Board of Education. In 1907 it moved into a new building at Park Place near Nostrand Avenue in Brooklyn and Emma L. Johnson was its principal. During the time Gurr attended, it had a one-year training program to prepare students for the examination to become licensed elementary school teachers. Shortly after she graduated, the school was renamed the Maxwell Training School for Teachers after William H. Maxwell, who, as a superintendent of schools, helped create the school.) In May of that year she obtained her teaching certificate.

Gurr met her future husband, Joseph Biel, while they were both students at the Art Students League. She accompanied him to France from 1929 through 1931, and they married on November 24, 1931. Her father died in 1934 (Note: He was then widowed, living in the East New York section of Brooklyn, and working as a presser.) and her husband died in 1943 at the age of 52. (Note: He had been born in Grodno, Poland (later absorbed into Russia) and had lived in England, France, and Australia before coming to New York. An artist, he specialized in landscape paintings and silkscreen printing as well as photography. He studied art at the Russian Academy in Paris. After immigrating to the United States, he studied under George Grosz at the Arts Students League. Of Biel she said, "His premature death halted a talent that might have reached great heights.") After marrying, Gurr and Biel had bought a house in the East Flatbush section of Brooklyn and after his death Gurr opted to spend the rest of her life there. "We had planned the home for so long", she told a reporter, "I was determined to stay on there." She did not remarry. They had no children. She died in Brooklyn on February 19, 1992. She was well organised and said in an interview that an artist's studio should be as tidy as an office. Her papers are now in the Archives of American Art.

Other names

Gurr used Lena Gurr as her professional name. After marrying she was sometimes referred to as Lena Gurr Biel.
