= Riva Helfond =

American artist and printmaker

- Born: March 8, 1910; Brooklyn, New York, U.S.
- Died: May 13, 2002 (aged 92); Plainfield, New Jersey, U.S.
- Other names: Riva Helfond Barrett, Riva Barrett Helfond
- Occupations: printmaker, artist
- Spouse: William (Bill) Barrett (sculptor)

Riva Helfond (March 8, 1910 – May 13, 2002) was an American artist and printmaker best known for her social realist studies of working people's lives.

== Early life and education ==
Riva Helfond was born in Brooklyn, New York, to a Jewish family. She spent some of her childhood in Russia and returned to New York at the age of eleven, living in New York or New Jersey for most of the rest of her life. Between 1928 and 1940, she studied at the School of Industrial Art and the Art Students League; her teachers included William von Schlegell, Yasuo Kuniyoshi, and Morris Kantor for painting and Harry Sternberg for printmaking. Among her fellow students were Alexander Brook and her future husband, the sculptor William (Bill) Barrett (d. 1967).

== Teaching ==
Helfond began teaching in the College Art Association Program (1933–36) and then taught printmaking at the Harlem Arts Community Center (1936–38), opened by the Federal Art Project of the Works Progress Administration. She was brought in to set up the Center’s printmaking program. Initially she taught lithography alongside Jacob Lawrence, Romare Bearden, Robert Joseph and others before moving to the graphic arts division, where she worked with Louis Lozowick and Jacob Kainen, and the silkscreen division, which was supervised by Anthony Velonis and which had Harry Gottlieb, Elizabeth Olds, and Hyman Warsager as founding members. Among her students at the Center was Robert Blackburn, who would go on to found New York's Printmaking Workshop in the 1940s. Later on, Helfond taught printmaking at New York University (1964), and she was on the faculty of Union College in Cranford, New Jersey, from 1980 onwards.

== Artwork ==
From 1936 to 1941, Helfond was an artist in the New York Works Progress Administration program's graphics division, creating work in a variety of media, including lithographs, woodcuts, etchings, aquatints, collograph, and silkscreens. Some of her work shows the impact that color had as it entered American printmaking during this period, and she was adventurous in exploring the possibilities opened up by screen printing. She printed all of her own work, which ranged from austere, often monochromatic social realist portraits of working people and cityscapes in the 1920s and 1930s to colorful, abstract, lyrical landscapes in later years. Some of her color abstractions originated as watercolors from nature during travels in Greece and France and were then turned into oil paintings.

Helfond was politically progressive, and along with contemporaries like Elizabeth Olds, Beatrice Mandelman, and Minna Citron, she is especially well known for works that "pointedly condemned the state of labor, and the relationship between big business and big government, in the 1930s." Examples of these include Custom Made (1940), a lithograph showing a woman slumped over her work in a WPA sewing room, and Snow Clearing (1933), showing men at work shoveling a street.

Art historian Helen Langa writes that Helfond “took jobs in hat and textile factories while studying at the Art Students League in the early 1930’s, and her color lithograph Curtain Factory (1936-39) draws on those experiences. At first glance, this depiction of women sharing a crowded work space might appear to be impartial reportage, but Helfond’s iteration of the downward curves of each woman’s body expressively conveys the tiring nature of their repetitive tasks. The awkward angles of furniture, walls, and shelves clash against each other, further reinforcing the mode of anxiety and stress.”

There are also a number of prints about the grim lives of coal miners, such as Miner and Wife (1937), an American Gothic–style portrait of a couple, with the husband showing a closed fist; Out of the Pit (1935), a double portrait of miners with blackened faces; and Coal Picker (1938), showing elderly women scavenging in a coal mine. After Helfond married Bill Barrett, whose Welsh relatives worked in the mines, she used these new connections to bring other artists interested in social justice together with the miners. Helfond ran into several obstacles while working in the coal districts of Pennsylvania. For one thing, she was irked that the gatherings of miners and her male artist friends in the local bars tended to exclude her and other women, making it harder for her to develop the relationships necessary to her work. Another obstacle sprang from cultural differences: Helfond recounted how in the mining town of Lansford, the local women became less friendly when she revealed that she was Jewish. Despite these challenges, Helfond's prints of coal miners are considered an important addition to the body of work documenting the lives of the working poor during the New Deal.

Her work was included in the 1940 MoMA show American Color Prints Under $10. The show was organized as a vehicle for bringing affordable fine art prints to the general public. Helfond was also included in the 1947 and 1951 Dallas Museum of Fine Arts exhibitions of the National Serigraph Society.

Helfond's work has been exhibited at the Corcoran Gallery of Art, Washington, D.C. (1960), the Newark Museum of Fine Arts (1964, 1967), and elsewhere. It is represented in the permanent collections of the Metropolitan Museum of Art, the Los Angeles County Museum of Art, the Museum of Modern Art (New York), the Brooklyn Museum, the Boston Museum of Fine Art, the Springfield Museum of Fine Art, the Newark Museum of Fine Art, and the Library of Congress, among other institutions. In 2009, her work was featured in the exhibition "Industrial Strength: Precisionism and New Jersey" at the Jersey City Museum.

Helfond counted as friends a wide circle of Abstract Expressionist artists and critics, including Willem de Kooning, Arshile Gorky, Franz Kline, and Harold Rosenberg.

In later life she lived in Plainfield, New Jersey, where she owned and managed the Barrett Art Gallery on East Front Street, which she had started with her husband in the 1960s. In the early 1950s, she designed a rose window for the First Unitarian Society of Plainfield's All Souls Church. In 1972 Helfond and fellow artists Hyman Warsager, Lois Berghoff, Zelda Burdick, and Lila Ryan formed “Five Directions in Graphics", a group of printmakers that exhibited together. A flier printed by the group states: “Printmaking for them is a viable means of expression and though they work and print individually, they join together for the exchange of ideas and technical, exploratory information”.
