= Ruth Chaney =

American artist

- Born: 1908; Kansas City, Missouri
- Died: 1973 (aged 64–65)
- Known for: Printmaking

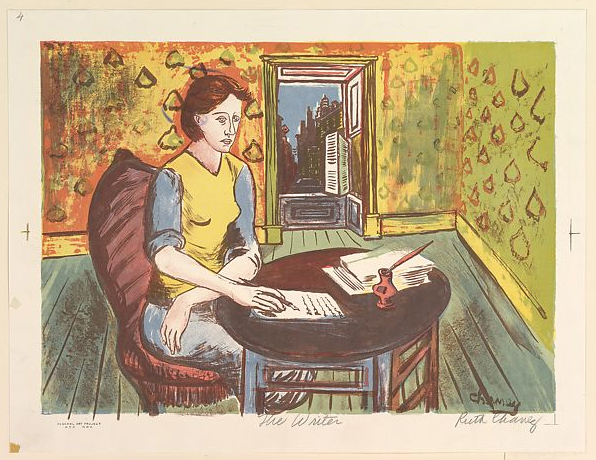
The Writer, c. 1935-1943

Ruth Chaney (1908–1973) was an American artist known for her printmaking.

== Biography ==
Chaney was born in 1908 in Kansas City, Missouri. She created serigraphs for the Work Projects Administration (WPA) in its Federal Art Project. Chaney led a subway art division, one of the many committees set up by the Public Use of Arts Committee. The committee invited union members to create art that would stand up to the harsh conditions of the subway. She was included in the 1938 MoMA show "Subway art".

Chaney's work was also included in the 1940 MoMA show American Color Prints Under $10. The show was organized as a vehicle for bringing affordable fine art prints to the general public. She exhibited at the 1944, 1947, and 1951 Dallas Museum of Art exhibitions of the National Serigraph Society.

Chaney was in the first group of artists who received technical advice, in late 1938, on silk screen printing from Anthony Velonis, the leader of the Federal Art Project's newly established Silk Screen Unit. Carl Zigrosser, Curator of Prints, Drawings, and Rare Books at the Philadelphia Museum of Art (1941–63), wrote in 1941 that "The seventh member of the original group, Ruth Chaney, is an all-around graphic artist with definite accomplishment in all mediums, particularly in the color field, color woodcut and color lithography, as well as silk screen. Her first (Federal Art) Project serigraph was Elevated; another successful one was Girl in Grey. She has made about a dozen more independently, notably Evening in six stencils, beautiful in color and powerful in its suggestion of mood. Indeed in her work she is always the sensitive colorist and alert to architectonic form. In addition to such city scenes as Evening and the more recent and delightful Afternoon, she has made heads and figures, School Girl and the Bathers, the latter executed in outline and contrasting monochrome wash with the freedom and spontaneity of a drawing. She manages to produce her effects with a minimum number of stencils, usually employing nor more than six an sometimes as few as two."

Her work is in the collections of the Smithsonian American Art Museum, the Metropolitan Museum of Art, the Art Institute of Chicago, the Philadelphia Museum of Art, the Museum of Modern Art, the National Gallery of Art, and the Krannert Art Museum at the University of Illinois, Urbana-Champaign.

Chaney was the recipient of a MacDowell Fellowship in 1942. She was a resident of the Adams studio at the MacDowell Colony.

Chaney died in 1973.
