= Dora Kaminsky =

American painter (1909–1977)

Dora D. Kaminsky
- Self-portrait
- Born: Dora Deborah Kaminsky; August 10, 1909; New York City, United States
- Died: February 24, 1977 (aged 67); Phoenix, AZ
- Education: Art Students League of New York
- Known for: Serigraph
- Spouse: Leon Gaspard

Dora Deborah Kaminsky (1909–1977) was an American artist.

== Early life and education ==
Dora Deborah Kaminsky was born in New York City in 1909. As a child, she attended The Educational Alliance, followed by the Art Students League of New York. She proceeded to study in Europe in the 1930s, including in Vienna, Paris, Stuttgart, and Munich. She made money as an artists' model.

== Mid-life ==
Kaminsky worked at the Brooklyn Museum for three years as part of the teaching staff. In 1943 she was one of the charter members who organized the National Serigraph Society and remained a member for 13 years. Kaminsky first visited Taos, New Mexico in 1944, spending every other summer before settling there in 1954. She also had a home in Delphi, Greece. She worked in Hawaii for a brief period. Kaminsky was included in the 1947 and 1951 Dallas Museum of Fine Arts exhibitions of the National Serigraph Society.

In 1958 Kaminsky married fellow Taos artist Leon Gaspard. After he died in 1964 she served as curator of retrospective exhibitions of his work held at the West Texas Museum and New Mexico Museum of Art. From 1972 to 1973 she visited Africa and India.

She worked in serigraph printing, pastel drawing, and painting. Her serigraphs have appeared in such collections as the Memphis Academy of Arts, Baltimore Museum, and the Metropolitan Museum.

== Later life and legacy ==
Her awards include the National Treasury Competition Purchase Award in 1940, the Metropolitan Museum Purchase Prize in 1941 and the top purchase award in serigraph from the Santa Fe Art Museum. She received a Wurlitzer Foundation grant for the years 1956 and 1957.

She died in 1977.

== Notable collections ==
- The Abandoned Sluice, watercolor, Smithsonian American Art Museum, Washington, D.C.
