= Mildred Rackley =

American artist

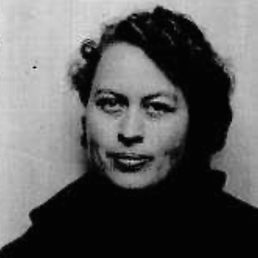
- Rackley in Spain c. 1938
- Born: October 13, 1906; Carlsbad, New Mexico Territory, U.S.
- Died: November 19, 1992 (aged 86); Lafayette, California, U.S.
- Known for: Printmaking
- Spouse(s): Hans Paap, Rawlings Simon

Mildred Rackley (1906–1992) was an American artist known for her printmaking. She is also known for her work in medical services in Spain during the Spanish Civil War.

== Biography ==
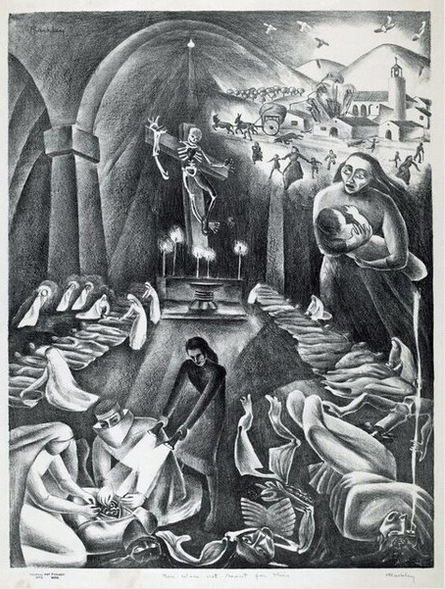
Men Were Not Meant for This, c. 1940

Rackley was born on October 13, 1906, in Carlsbad, New Mexico Territory. She attended the University of Texas and completed her education at the Las Vegas, N.M. Normal School. In 1927 she began a teaching career, teaching high school in Taos, New Mexico. There she became acquainted with, and influenced by Walter Ufer of the Taos Society of Artists. Around 1930 she traveled to Europe with her then-husband, Hans Paap.

In 1935 Rackley moved to New York City. There she worked for the American League Against War and Fascism's magazine Fight and joined the Artists Union and the American Communist Party.

She returned to Europe again in 1937, serving in the Abraham Lincoln Brigade, where she helped organize and American hospital for the volunteers fighting in the Spanish Civil War. She returned to America in 1938

Rackley's work was included in the 1940 MoMA show American Color Prints Under $10 The show was organized as a vehicle for bringing affordable fine art prints to the general public. She was also included in the 1947 and the 1951 Dallas Museum of Fine Arts exhibitions of the National Serigraph Society. She also exhibited her work at the Art Institute of Chicago and the Carnegie International.

During World War II Rackley worked in shipyards in California. After the war she was active in the Veterans of the Abraham Lincoln Brigade (VALB).

Rackley died on November 19, 1992, in Lafayette, California. She was married twice; first to Hans Paap, then to Rawlings Simon. Rackley's work is in the collection of the National Gallery of Art.
