= Francine Felsenthal =

American artist

- Born: 1922; Chicago, Illinois
- Died: 2000 (aged 77–78)
- Known for: Painting, Printmaking

Francine Felsenthal (1922–2000) was an American artist. She also used the name Francine L. Fels.

== Biography ==
Felsenthal was born in 1922 in Chicago, Illinois. She attended the Art Institute of Chicago. She was a classmate and friend of the painter Joan Mitchell. Felsenthal trained at the Atelier 17.

Felsenthal was included in the 1947 Dallas Museum of Fine Arts exhibitions of the National Serigraph Society. Her work was also exhibited at the Art Institute of Chicago. She was a member of the 10th Street cooperative March Gallery.

Her work is in the collection of the National Gallery of Art and the Fine Arts Museums of San Francisco.

Felsenthal died in 2000
