= Kurt Sluizer =

American artist (1911–1988

- Born: April 26, 1911; Amsterdam, Netherlands
- Died: November 14, 1988 (aged 77); Zena, New York, United States
- Known for: Painter; printmaker

Kurt Sluizer (April 26, 1911 – November 14, 1988) was a Dutch-born American artist.

== Biography ==
Sluizer was born on April 26, 1911, in Amsterdam. He attended the Rijksakademie van beeldende kunsten (State Academy of Fine Arts). In 1936, he and his wife Esther fled Europe and subsequent holocaust. The couple settled in the hamlet of Zena in the town of Woodstock, New York. They lived in a house previously owned by the artist Bolton Brown. A home movie from the late 1940s of the Sluizers in their Zena home is in the archives of the United States Holocaust Memorial Museum. Sluizer's work was included in 1944 Dallas Museum of Art exhibition of the National Serigraph Society. Sluizer died in 1988 in Zena, New York.

His work is in the collection of the Georgia Museum of Art, the Springville Museum of Art, and the Stedelijk Museum Amsterdam.
