= Mary Van Blarcom =

American artist

- Born: 1913; Newark, New Jersey, U.S.
- Died: 1953 (aged 39–40); Point Pleasant, New Jersey, U.S.
- Known for: Printmaking

Mary Van Blarcom (1913–1953) was an American artist known for her printmaking.

== Biography ==
Van Blarcom was born in 1913 in Newark, New Jersey. She studied at Wellesley College.

She was a member of the National Association of Women Artists. She was also a member of the National Serigraph Society (which is about silk screening), serving on the board of trustees from 1945 through 1952. Van Blarcom was included in the 1947 and the 1951 Dallas Museum of Fine Arts exhibitions of the National Serigraph Society. She also exhibited her work the Carnegie International. Additional notable venues for her works include the Elisabet Ney Museum, the Library of Congress, the Montclair Art Museum, the National Association of Women Artists, the Philadelphia Art Alliance, and the Society of Independent Artists.

Van Blarcom died in 1953 in Point Pleasant, New Jersey at the age of 40.
