= Mervin Jules =

American artist

- Mervin Jules, 1944 screen print by Harry Sternberg
- Born: 1912; Baltimore, Maryland
- Died: July 29, 1994 (aged 81–82); Provincetown, Massachusetts
- Known for: painter, printmaker
- Movement: Social realism

Mervin Jules (1912–1994) was an American artist known for his silk screen prints.

== Biography ==
Jules was born in 1912 in Baltimore, Maryland. He contracted polio as a child which damaged his legs. He used canes and braces for the rest of his life. He attended Baltimore City College and the Maryland Institute College of Art (MICA). He then moved to New York City where he studied at the Art Students League of New York. His teachers included Thomas Hart Benton. During the 1930s Jules was a member of the Silk Screen Unit of the Works Progress Administration's (WPA) Fine Arts Project. In 1940, he married fellow artist Rita Albers (1914 - 1974), with whom he had three children.

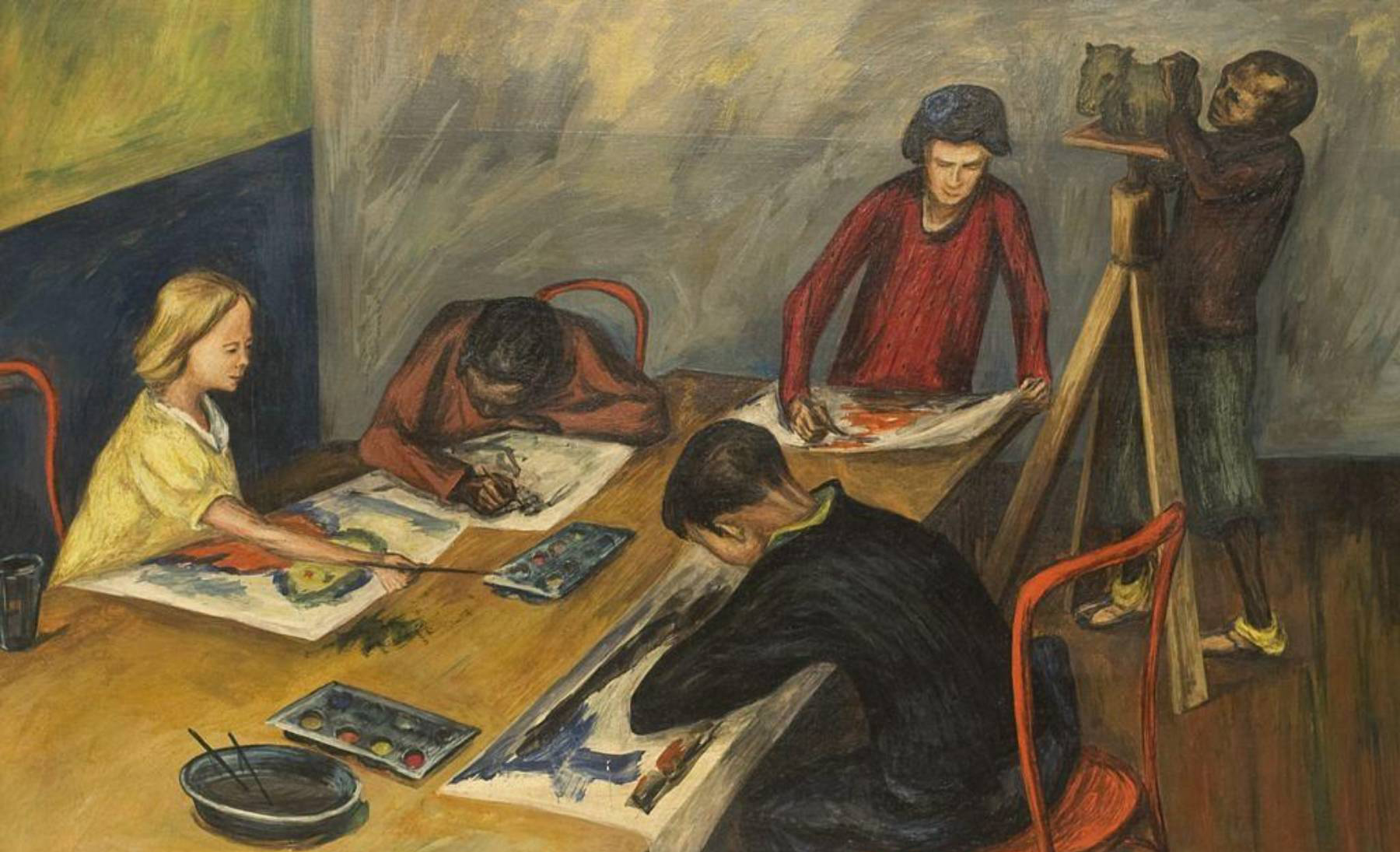
WPA Art Class by Mervin Jules 1945

In 1945 he served as artist-in-residence at Smith College for a year. He then went on to teach at Smith until 1970 where he served for a time as head of the art department. From 1970 until 1980 he served as chairman of the art department of the City College of New York (CCNY)

Jules' work was included in 1944 Dallas Museum of Art exhibition of the National Serigraph Society.

Jules died on July 29, 1994, in Provincetown, Massachusetts.

Jules' work is in the collections of the Albright–Knox Art Gallery, the Amon Carter Museum of American Art, the Art Institute of Chicago, the Baltimore Museum of Art, Harvard Art Museums, the Museum of Modern Art, the Phillips Collection, the Portland Art Museum, the Smithsonian American Art Museum, the Walker Art Center, and the Whitney Museum of American Art.
