= Louise Arnstein Freedman =

American artist

- Born: Louise Arnstein; 1915; St. Louis, Missouri
- Died: June 5, 2001 (aged 85–86)
- Known for: Printmaking
- Spouse: Maurice Freedman

Louise Arnstein Freedman (1915 - 2001) was an American artist, known for illustration, lithography and serigraphy.

== Biography ==
Freedman was born in 1915 in St. Louis, Missouri. She graduated from Vassar College in 1937 where she learned the technique of lithography from Harry Sternberg. and went on to study at the Art Students League of New York. She also studied at The New School, Teachers College, the Pennsylvania Academy of the Fine Arts, and the St. Louis School of Fine Arts at Washington University.

She was a founding member of the National Serigraph Society. She was included in the 1947 and 1951 Dallas Museum of Fine Arts exhibitions of the National Serigraph Society.

Freedman exhibited her work at the Brooklyn Museum, the Hudson River Museum, the Library of Congress, and the Metropolitan Museum of Art.

Her work is included in the collections of the National Gallery of Art. and the Museum of Modern Art, New York. She was married to fellow artist Maurice Freedman (1904-1985).

Freedman died on June 5, 2001.
