= Max Arthur Cohn =

British painter

Max Arthur Cohn (1903–1998) was an English-born American artist. His family immigrated to the United States when he was two years old.

Cohn was one of the artists employed by the New Deal's Works Progress Administration (WPA) during the Great Depression, painting for the Easel Project and the Public Works of Art Project. At this period he took up silk screening, a technique he had learned in a commercial art studio in 1920. In 1940, Cohn, Anthony Velonis, Hyman Warsager and other artists co-founded the National Serigraph Society.

== Andy Warhol's introduction to silkscreen printing ==
Cohn is credited with introducing a young Andy Warhol to silkscreen techniques. A biography of Warhol on Sotheby's site states: "Warhol had a successful start in NYC as an illustrator in advertising, and he was commissioned to draw shoes for Glamour magazine in the 1940s. A few exhibitions in the 1950s brought him attention and notoriety, and Max Arthur Cohn taught him how to create silkscreens in the 1960s, leading to a fertile period of artistic output and some of Warhol’s most famous works such as Campbell’s Soup Cans and Marilyn Diptych. Warhol’s Factory attracted bohemians, artists, models and socialites, all contributing to shaping NYC’s culture as a mecca for creative souls."

=== Zimmerli Art Museum exhibit, 2018 ===
An article in Art Daily in 2018 discussed an exhibit at the Zimmerli Art Museum at Rutgers University titled Serigraphy: The Rise of Screenprinting in America that included a dramatic print by Cohn: "Rainy Day (circa 1940) by Max Arthur Cohn contrasts many of the works in the show. Unlike the other vibrant and dynamic prints, it captures the glistening gloom of a drenched city street at night, with a few lonely city dwellers attempting to escape the elements. But this unassuming artist went on to own a graphic arts business in Manhattan, where he is said to have taught silkscreen techniques to a young man named Andy Warhol in the 1950s."

== Works ==
Cohn's works are in MoMa New York, the Metropolitan Museum of Art, the Art Institute of Chicago, the Whitney Museum of American Art, the National Gallery of Art, and the Philadelphia Museum of Art. The largest collection of Cohn's works is held by the University of Wisconsin-Milwaukee.

With Jacob Israel Biegeleisen he authored Silk Screen Stenciling as a Fine Art (1942), expanded to Silk Screen Techniques (1958).
