= National Serigraph Society =

- Formation: 1940
- Purpose: To support and promote American artists creating and printing works using the silkscreen process.
- Formerly called: Silk Screen Group

The National Serigraph Society was founded in 1940 by a group of artists involved in the WPA Federal Art Project, including Anthony Velonis, Max Arthur Cohn, and Hyman Warsager. The creation of the society coincided with the rise of serigraphs being used as a medium for fine art. Originally called the Silk Screen Group, the name was soon changed to the National Serigraph Society.

The National Serigraph Society had its own gallery, the Serigraph Gallery at 38 West 57th Street in New York City. They published a quarterly newsletter called the "Serigraph Quarterly." The Society had lectures, published prints, and coordinated traveling shows.

In "The Complete Printmaker: Techniques, Traditions, Innovations", the authors wrote that this organization, by 1940, had an active program of "traveling exhibits, lectures, and portfolios of prints (that) helped to sustain and broaden interest in the serigraph. Artists such as Ben Shahn, Mervin Jules, Ruth Gikow, Edward Landon, and Hyman Warsager were intrigued by the medium".

In their 1970 book “Silk-Screen Printing for Artists & Craftsmen”, Mathilda V. and James A. Schwalbach wrote that a “major force in the development of serigraphy as a fine art was the formation in 1940 of the National Serigraph Society. It has set standards of excellence and has sent hundreds of exhibitions of its members’ work to countries all over the world. These exhibitions are responsible for a good deal of museum interest in the purchase of original prints as part of museum collections”.

J.I. Biegeleisen and Max Arthur Cohn (a co-founder of the Society noted above), writing in 1942 about the origin and development of serigraphy, observed: "Specially noteworthy has been the work of the National Serigraph Society, New York, which has been the source of inspiration, clearing house, and temple of artists and print makers everywhere. The National Serigraph Society and its active director, Doris Meltzer, have been largely responsible for promoting this new print form and raising it to the level of a museum art form".

== Dallas Museum of Art Exhibits ==
In 1944, 1947, and 1951 the Dallas Museum of Art held exhibitions of the National Serigraph Society.

The artists listed in the checklists for these shows include:

- Adolf Aldrich
- Virginia (Vae) Barnes
- Charles Barrows
- B. Berkman-Hunter
- Sarah Berman
- George Beyer
- Joseph Biel (1891-1943)
- Morris Blackburn
- Dorr Bothwell
- William Boughton
- Louis Bunce
- Ruth Chaney
- Max Arthur Cohn
- Marion Cunningham
- Frank Davidson
- Roy DeCarava
- James Egleson
- Ray Euffa
- Francine Felsenthal
- Harold Fiedler
- Richard Floethe
- Arthur L. Flory
- Syd Fossum
- Louise A. Freedman
- Ruth Gikow
- Maxwell Gordon
- Harry Gottlieb
- F. Wynn Graham
- Lena Gurr
- Robert Gwathmey
- Abraham P. Hankins
- Hananiah Harari
- Riva Helfond
- August Henkel
- Philip Hicken
- Ernest Hoff
- Ernest Hopf
- Hoyt Howard
- Marion Huse
- William H. Johnson
- Mervin Jules
- Dora Kaminsky
- Charles Keller (1914-2006)
- Robert Leland Kiley
- Bernard A. Kohn
- Chet La More
- Edward Landon
- Gretchen Lansford
- Gladys M. Lux
- Guy Maccoy
- Marie R. Macpherson
- Beatrice Mandelman
- Henry Mark
- James H. Mcconnell
- Joseph Meert
- Doris Meltzer
- Isaac Lane Muse
- Elizabeth Olds
- Geno Pettit
- William Herbert Plant
- Herbert William Pratt
- Leonard Pytlak
- Mildred Rackley
- Joseph Rajer
- Hulda D. Robbins
- Ruth Starr Rose
- Harry Shokler
- Harry Shoulberg
- Kurt Sluizer
- Bernard Steffen
- Harry Sternberg
- Abram Tromka
- Russell Twiggs
- Mary Van Blarcom
- Albert Urban
- Anthony Velonis
- Sylvia Wald
- Hyman Warsager
- Carol Weinstock
- Sol Wilson
