= Marion Huse =

American artist (1896–1967)

- Marion Huse, c. 1946
- Born: 1896; Lynn, Massachusetts
- Died: 1967 (aged 70–71)
- Known for: Printmaking
- Spouse: Robert Barstow

Marion Huse (1896-1967) was an American artist, known for painting and printmaking.

== Biography ==
Huse was born in 1896 in Lynn, Massachusetts. She studied at the New School of Design in Boston and the Carnegie Institute of Art and Technology.

Huse ran the Springfield Art School in Massachusetts from 1925 through 1940. In the 1930s, she worked as an artist for the Works Progress Administration eventually becoming supervisor for the western part of Vermont. She was married to Robert Barstow and led a peripatetic life, traveling around the United States and Europe.

Huse was included in the 1947 and 1951 Dallas Museum of Fine Arts exhibitions of the National Serigraph Society.

Her work was part of the collections of the Fuller Museum of Art, the Library of Congress, the Museum of Fine Arts, Boston, and the Victoria and Albert Museum.

Huse died in 1967. Her papers are stored in the Archives of American Art at the Smithsonian Institution.
