= Carol Weinstock =

American artist

- Born: 1914; New York, New York
- Died: 1971 (aged 56–57)
- Known for: Painting, Printmaking
- Spouse: Louis Nisonoff

Carol Weinstock (1914 - 1971) was an American artist and educator.

== Biography ==
Weinstock was born in 1914 in New York City. She attended the Art Students League of New York. She was married to fellow artist Louis Nisonoff (1907-1979). She was part of the Federal Art Project of the Works Progress Administration.

Weinstock's work was included in the 1940 MoMA show American Color Prints Under $10. The show was organized as a vehicle for bringing affordable fine art prints to the general public. She was included in the 1947 Dallas Museum of Fine Arts exhibition of the National Serigraph Society.

She also exhibited at the Art Institute of Chicago, the Metropolitan Museum of Art, MoMA, and the Whitney Museum of American Art.

Weinstock died in 1971. Her paper are preserved at the Smithsonian Institution Archives of American Art.
