= Joseph Rajer =

American artist

- Born: 1918
- Died: 1976 (aged 57–58)
- Known for: printmaker

Joseph Rajer (1918 - 1976) was an American artist known for his woodcuts and serigraphs.

== Biography ==
Rajer was born in 1918. He was a member of the Works Progress Administration New York graphic unit where he produced serigraphs (silk screens) and woodcuts. His work was included in 1944 Dallas Museum of Art exhibition of the National Serigraph Society. Rajer died in 1976.

Rajer's work is in the collection of the Metropolitan Museum of Art, the National Gallery of Art, and the Syracuse University Art Museum.

== Gallery ==
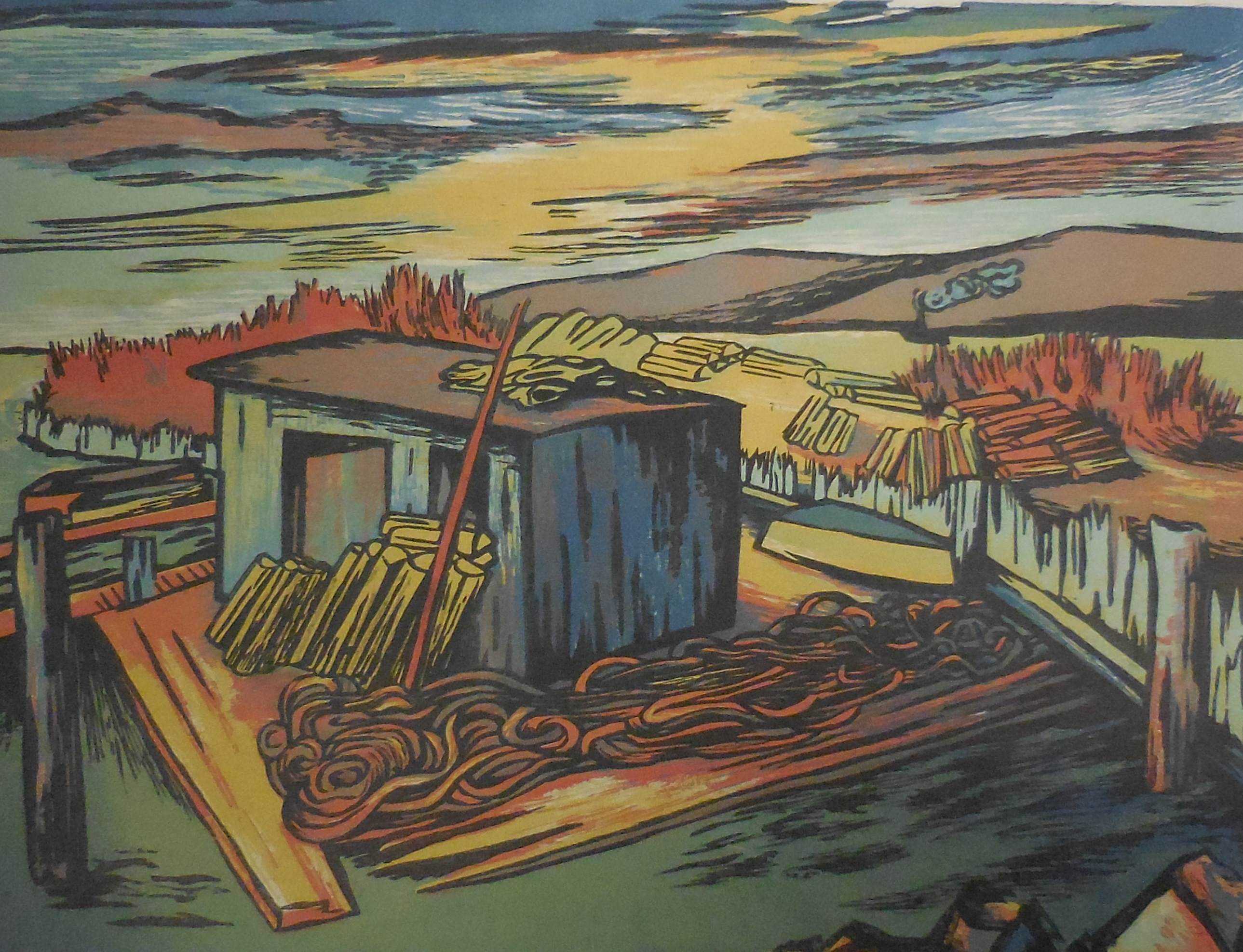
Ropes and Lobster Pots

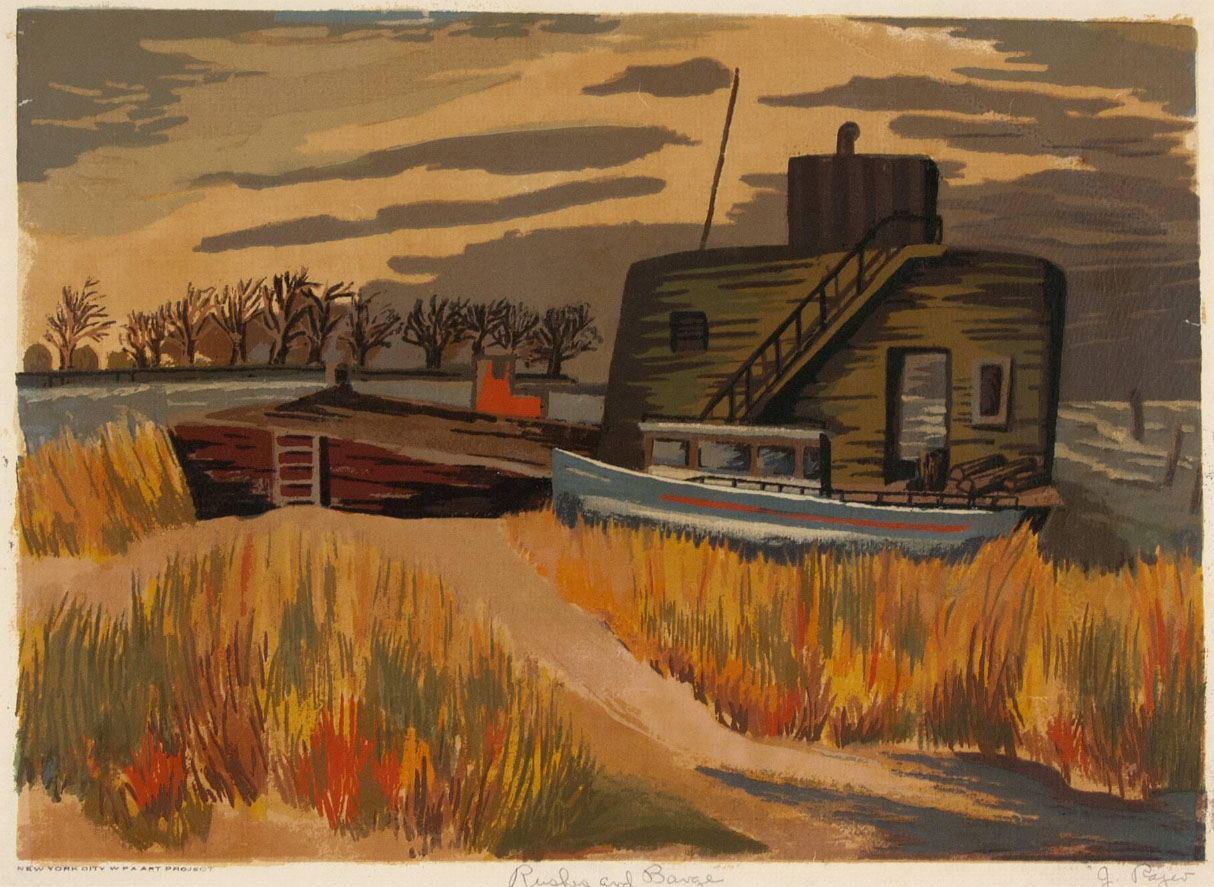
Rushes and Barges
