= Adolf Aldrich =

American artist

Adolf Henry Degiani Aldrich
- Born: 1916; Springfield, Massachusetts
- Died: 2010 (aged 93–94); Stroudsburg, Pennsylvania
- Known for: painter, printmaker, sculptor

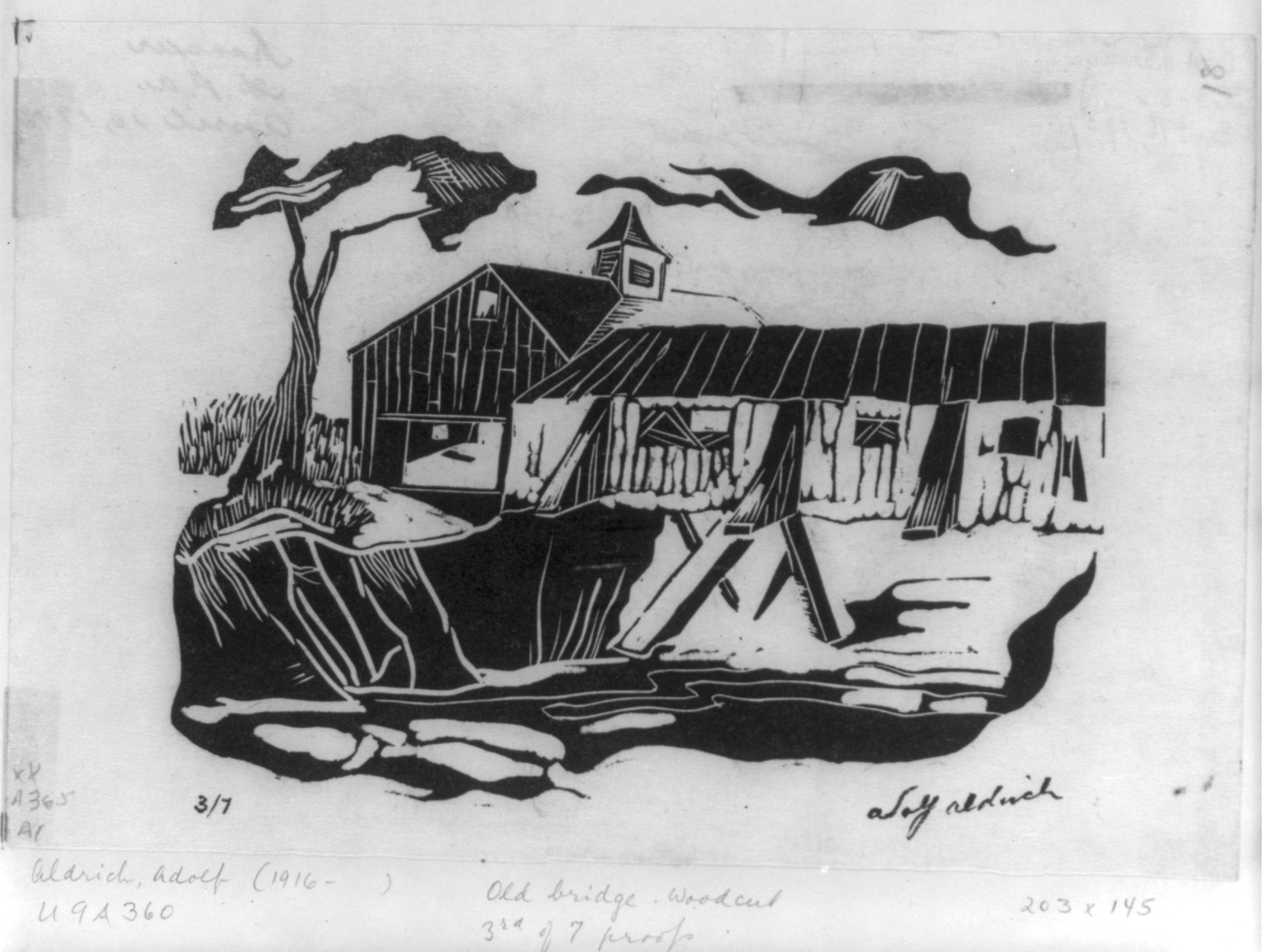
Old Bridge, 1937 woodcut

Adolf Aldrich (1916–2010) was an American artist.

== Biography ==
Aldrich was born in 1916 in Springfield, Massachusetts. In 1937 he produced the woodcut print Old Bridge for the Works Progress Administration. He contributed to a limited edition 1941 serigraph calendar along with fellow printmakers Philip Hicken, Edward Landon, Margaret Schadt, and Pauline Stiriss. During World War II Aldrich served as a Merchant Seaman.

Aldrich's work was included in 1944 Dallas Museum of Art exhibition of the National Serigraph Society. He was associated with the Atelier 17 printmaking studio in New York. He went on to pursue a career in graphic illustration and movie art direction, returning to painting in the 1990s.

Aldrich died on April 2, 2010, in Stroudsburg, Pennsylvania.

Aldrich's work is in the collection of the National Gallery of Art and the Library of Congress.
