= Hulda D. Robbins =

American artist

- Born: 1910; Atlanta, Georgia, US
- Died: 2011 (aged 100–101); Ventnor City, New Jersey, US
- Known for: Printmaking

Hulda D. Robbins (1910–2011) was an American artist.

== Biography ==
Robbins was born in 1910 in Atlanta, Georgia. She studied at the Pennsylvania Museum and School of Industrial Art, the Prussian Academy of Arts in Berlin, and the Barnes Foundation. Around 1940 she moved to New York City where she worked prolifically to produce serigraphs, lithographs and woodcut prints.

Robbins's work was included in the 1940 MoMA show American Color Prints Under $10. The show was organized as a vehicle for bringing affordable fine art prints to the general public. She also exhibited in the 1947 and 1951 Dallas Museum of Fine Arts exhibitions of the National Serigraph Society.

Her work is in the collections of the Metropolitan Museum of Art, the Noyes Museum, and the Philadelphia Museum of Art

Robbins died in 2011 in Ventnor City, New Jersey.
