= Guy Maccoy =

American artist

Guy Crittington Maccoy
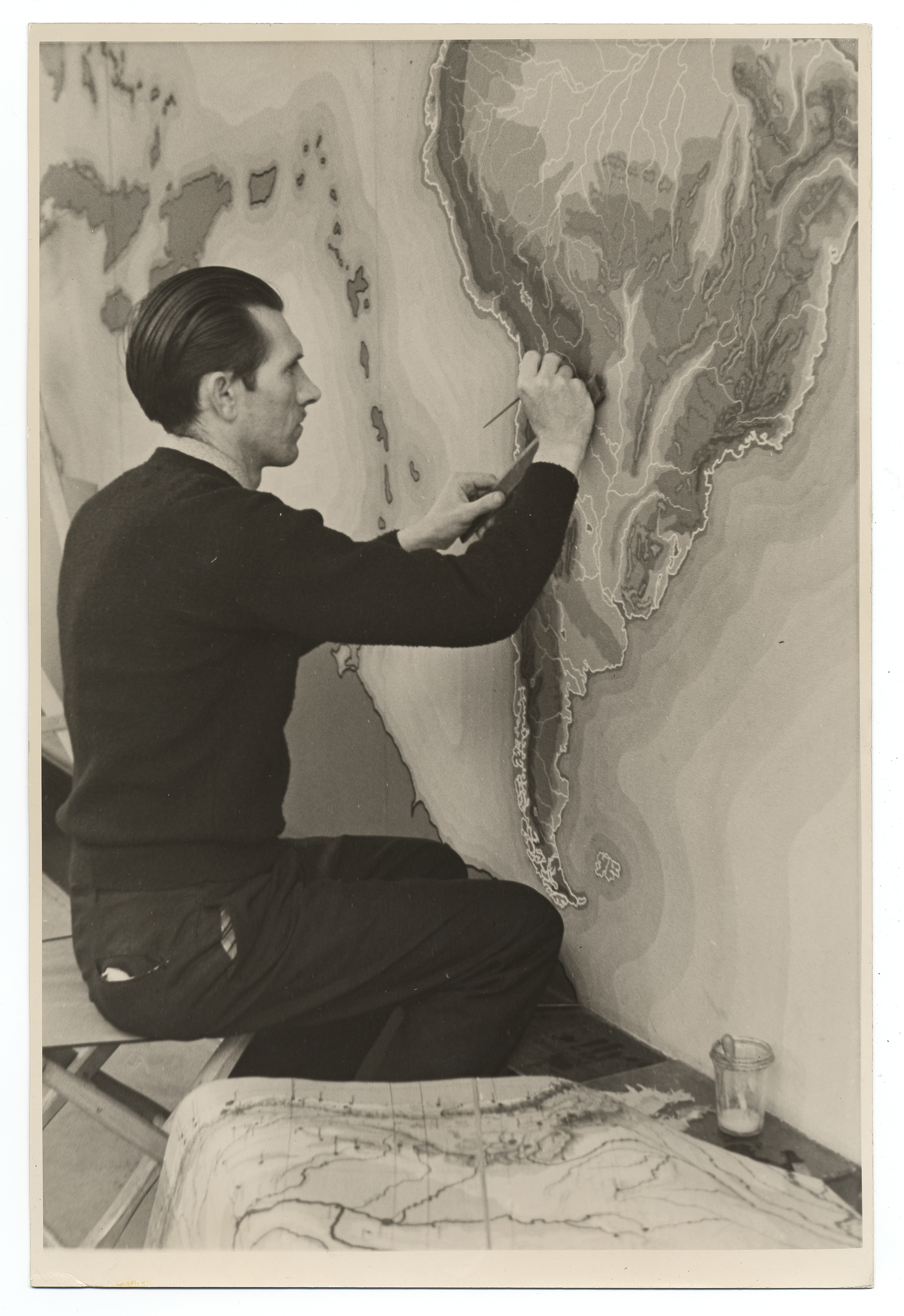
- Born: October 7, 1904; Valley Falls, Kansas
- Died: March 18, 1981 (aged 76); Los Angeles, California
- Known for: painter, printmaker, educator
- Spouse: Geno Pettit
- Website: guymaccoy.com

Guy Maccoy (1904 - 1981) was an American artist known for his serigraphs.

== Biography ==
Guy Crittington Maccoy was born on October 7, 1904 in Valley Falls, Kansas. He studied at the Kansas City Art Institute in Kansas City, Missouri, the Broadmoor Art Academy in Colorado Springs, Colorado, and the Art Students League of New York. For a time he worked at the Federal Art Project. He was married to fellow artist Genoi Pettit (1894-1982).

In the 1940s Maccoy's work was included in several of the Dallas Museum of Art exhibitions of the National Serigraph Society.

In 1947 Maccoy moved to Los Angeles, California where he taught at the Otis Art Institute and was a founder of the Western Serigraph Society. He died on March 18, 1981 in Los Angeles.

Maccoy's work is in the collection of the British Museum, the National Gallery of Art, the Philadelphia Museum of Art, and the Smithsonian American Art Museum.
