= Richard Floethe =

American artist

- Born: September 2, 1901; Essen, Germany
- Died: September 30, 1988 (aged 87); Sarasota, Florida
- Known for: printmaker, illustrator
- Spouse: Louise Lee Floethe
- Website: richardfloethe.com

Richard Floethe (1901–1988) was an American artist. He served as the art director of the Works Progress Administration's (WPA) Federal Art Project (FAP) New York City poster division and then went on to illustrate numerous books.

== Biography ==
Floethe was born September 2, 1901 in Essen, Germany. He studied at the Dortmund Art School, the Munich State School of Art, and the Bauhaus. Floethe emigrated to the United States in 1928.

In 1936 Floethe became the art director of the New York City poster division of the Works Progress Administration's (WPA) Federal Art Project (FAP). He served as the director through 1939. He hired the artist Anthony Velonis who introduced the silk-screening process into the program as a way to produce posters.

In 1937, he married Louise Lee with whom he had two children. Louise Lee Floethe was the author of children's books and Richard Floethe illustrated many of her books. Floethe turned to illustration after his career with the WPA. He is also noted for creating a wordless novel, Summer Holiday, published by The Brookdale Press in 1939.

Floethe's work was included in the 1944 Dallas Museum of Art exhibition of the National Serigraph Society. In 1975 he donated a 1939 WPA calendar to the Library of Congress. The calendar was an example of New York City Poster Division's work.

Floethe died on September 30, 1988, in Sarasota, Florida.

Floethe's work is in the Philadelphia Museum of Art, the National Gallery of Art, and the Delaware Art Museum.
