= Ruth Gikow =

American artist (1915–1982)

- Ruth Gikow with Susanna and Jack Levine, c.1950
- Born: January 6, 1915; Russian Empire
- Died: April 2, 1982 (aged 67); New York City, New York, U S.
- Known for: Visual artist, painter
- Spouse: Jack Levine (1946-1982; her death)
- Children: 1

Ruth Gikow (Russian: Руфь Борисовна Гикова, romanized: Ruf Borisovna Gikova; January 6, 1915 - April 2, 1982) was an American visual artist known primarily for her work as a genre painter. Her paintings often depict human figures interacting with an urban environment.

== Early life ==
Ruth Gikow was born on January 6, 1915, in the Russian Empire to Boris, a photographer, and Lena Gikow. In 1920, the family emigrated to New York City due to civil war and pogroms against the Jewish community. Once in New York City, the Gikow family found themselves in poverty, rather than the middle-class comfort they enjoyed in Ukraine. Ruth's skill was prominent even in youth, as she excelled in drawing in elementary school and entered Washington Irving High School at age thirteen in which she furthered her artistic skills.

Later, she studied at the Cooper Union Art School, where she studied under school director Austin Purvis, Jr. and regional artist John Steuart Curry. She was not present for the "simple diversions of her age group" due to prioritizing her art and her night time job at Woolworth's. In her second year of Art School, she was awarded a scholarship which she used to work with fellow painter Raphael Soyer.

She joined the New York City WPA Federal Art Project in 1935, where she was allowed to dedicate herself to her artwork full-time.

== Career ==
In 1939, inspired by the muralists Diego Rivera and José Clemente Orozco, she applied and later won a commission to paint murals for Bronx Hospital, Rockefeller Center and the New York World's Fair. After the events of Pearl Harbor and once the Federal Arts Project was abandoned, Gikow's murals were solely sought after by New York department stores wishing to commission wall paintings. Gikow became disillusioned with mural painting due to the commercial aspect of these commissions.

With other associates, she founded the American Serigraph Society in which she developed her technique with silk screen printing. Helfond was included in the 1940 MoMA show American Color Prints Under $10. The show was organized as a vehicle for bringing affordable fine art prints to the general public. Her work was also included in the 1947 and 1951 Dallas Museum of Fine Arts exhibitions of the National Serigraph Society.

In 1946 she married the artist Jack Levine, whose dedication and concentration inspired and challenged her own work. In the same year she held her first solo exhibition at the Weyhe Gallery in New York City in which she displayed her experimental prints to a positive audience. A young Eleanor Antin, who would later become a famed photographer and performance artist, modeled for Gikow's early artworks.

In 1959 she was awarded a grant from the American Academy of Arts and Letters. In 1979 she was elected into the National Academy of Design as an Associate member and became a full Academician in 1982.

== Artistic style ==
Gikow became renowned for her large scale paintings which depict city settings and imagery. Although, her collection of works also encompass contemporary human figures from various walks of life besides urban crowds.

Originally, Gikow wished to work as a fashion or commercial artist, yet could not find work despite her qualifications due to the effects of the Depression. She was stated to have moved away from commercial art due to the inspiration she received from a classmate. The classmate had sketched the image of caged animal while on a field trip to the zoo and Gikow found the image to capture not the likeness of the creature but instead the tension and essence. Gikow found this to be what she wished to create.

Her earlier experiments with printing, such as her 1943 serigraph Flood, are of a much more surreal style than her later paintings. Gikow's early prints experiment with color, shape, dimension, and tension as she employed a style leaning towards the abstract with vague human figures composed of layered shapes and an emphasis on bold colors.

While travelling abroad with her husband in 1947 Gikow was exposed to master artists such as Piero della Francesca and Masaccio. Due to this influence, she came to develop her more naturalistic style in which human figures are rendered with more detail, light sketchy lines, anatomically accurate proportions, and heavy, defining shading. A piece that demonstrates this transition from abstract to naturalistic is the 1969 lithograph Protest. This work highlights her emphasis on capturing the human form with expressive strokes in a more naturalistic style.

== Public collections ==
Her work can be found many institutions, including:

- Metropolitan Museum of Art
- Museum of Modern Art
- Philadelphia Museum of Art
- Whitney Museum

== Sources ==
- Josephson, Matthew. Ruth Gikow, New York: Maecenas/Random House, 1970
- Paula Hyman; Deborah Dash Moore, eds. (January 1998). Jewish Women in America: A-L. Taylor & Francis, 1997. ISBN 978-0-415-91934-0.
