= Gladys M. Lux =

American artist

- Born: 1899; Chapman, Nebraska, US
- Died: 2003 (aged 103–104); Lincoln, Nebraska, US
- Known for: Painting
- Website: gladyslux.org

Gladys M. Lux (1899-2003) was an American artist and educator, known for painting and printmaking.

== Biography ==
Lux was born in 1899 in Chapman, Nebraska. She studied to be at teacher at Kearney State College and taught in Nebraska schools for two years before return to study at University of Nebraska in Lincoln.

In 1927 Lux began teaching art at Nebraska Wesleyan University where she continued to teach for the next four decades, eventually serving as head of the art department.

In 1933 Lux applied for a position as a Works Progress Administration artist, and was accepted. Before producing any work she was dropped from the program in favor of an artist with greater need. She continued to paint, mostly people and landscapes of the rural Midwest, in the Regionalist style. She exhibited her work at a variety of venues including the 1939 New York World's Fair, and in 1940 a solo show in at the Joslyn Art Museum. Lux was included in the 1947 and 1951 Dallas Museum of Fine Arts exhibitions of the National Serigraph Society.

In 1985 she founded the University Place Art Center. She purchased the former city hall building of the village of University Place (now in Lincoln) and donated the building to serve as a nonprofit community arts organization. It has since been renamed the LUX Center for the Arts.

Throughout her life Lux acquired fine art prints, assembling a collection of over 200 prints, mostly through the Organization of American College Society of Print Collectors and the Associated American Artists.

Lux died in 2003 in Lincoln. She never married and spent her life in Nebraska.
