= Doris Meltzer =

American artist

- Born: 1908; Ulster County, New York
- Died: October 18, 1977 (aged 68–69); New York, New York
- Known for: Serigraphy

Doris Meltzer (1908–1977) was an American artist and art dealer.

She was born in 1908 in Ulster County, New York. Meltzer attended the Art Students League of New York.

Her older sister, Rachel Meltzer (1904-1994) was married to the American poet Kenneth Fearing (1902-1961).

Meltzer was a member of the American Federation of Arts and, for a time, served as the director of the National Serigraph Society. She was also an art dealer and gallery owner.

Her work was included in the 1940 MoMA show American Color Prints Under $10 The show was organized as a vehicle for bringing affordable fine art prints to the general public. She was also included in the 1947 and the 1951 Dallas Museum of Fine Arts exhibitions of the National Serigraph Society.

Meltzer work is in the collection of the National Gallery of Art and the Virginia Museum of Fine Arts.

She died on October 18, 1977, in New York City. Her papers are in the Archives of American Art at the Smithsonian Institution.
