= Leon Gaspard =

Belarusian-born American painter

Leon Schulman Gaspard
- Born: Leiba Schulman; October 1, 1883; Vitebsk, possibly Ulla, Russian Empire
- Died: February 21, 1964 (aged 81); Taos, New Mexico, U.S.
- Resting place: Sierra Vista Cemetery, Taos, New Mexico
- Education: School of Yury (Yudel) Pen, Odessa Art School, Academie Julian
- Known for: Painting
- Notable work: La Kermesse, Russian Forest, Falconry in Central Asia, Souvenir of Manchuria, San Geronimo Fiesta
- Style: Romantic realism
- Spouse(s): Evlyn Gasper, Dora Kaminsky

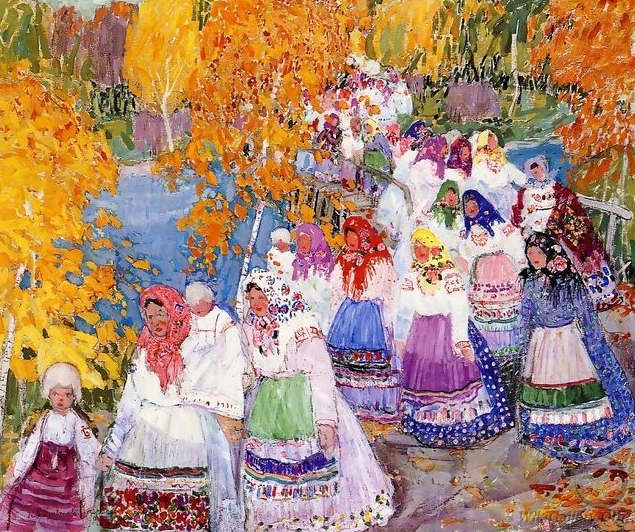
Russian Peasant Parade (1911)

Leon Schulman Gaspard (1 or 2 October 1883 [other sources provide 2 March 1882] – 21 February 1964) was a Russian-born painter, known for his paintings of indigenous cultures and folk traditions. He tended to paint scenes with throngs of people, and his favorite locations were in small towns in Belarus, Russia, Asia, and Taos, New Mexico. He spent his youth in Russia and later studied in Paris, where he became a well-respected painter. He moved with his wife, Evlyn Gasper, to the United States. They eventually settled in Taos, New Mexico, though he continued to devote much of his time to traveling to paint in remote locations.

== Early life and education ==
Gaspard was born Leiba Schulman, a son of a Jewish carpenter Shmuel Schulman and his wife Cyra Abram. His birthplace was either Vitebsk or Ulla, a small town about 35 miles west of Vitebsk. He pursued art studies in his hometown, Vitebsk. He studied at the school of Yury (Yehuda) Pen, a well-known Jewish-Belarusian artist. From 1899 or 1900 to 1904. Schulman continued his education at the Odessa Art School. In 1905, he departed for Paris and enrolled at the Académie Julian, where he studied two months (May 8 - June 12 and October 30 - November 27, 1905). Despite his later claims that his teacher was William-Adolphe Bouguereau, his mentors at the Académie were Marcel Baschet and Edouard Toudouze. In Paris, he started calling himself Léon Schulman(n).

== Personal life ==
In 1908, Schulman met Evlyn Gasper, a daughter of a wealthy American widow Eugenia Ward who was visiting Paris. She married him despite her mother's' objections, on December 24, 1908, at the civil ceremony at the Mayor's office of the 14th arrondissement of the city of Paris. The couple had another marriage ceremony on July 19 (Julian calendar; August 1, Gregorian calendar),1912, at the Ilyinskaya Russian Orthodox church in Vitebsk, which must have been predated by Schulman's conversion from Judaism to Russian Orthodoxy. In 1911, Schulman started adding his wife's slightly modified maiden name to his own, using several variations: Léon-Gaspar Schulman(n). Léon S. Gaspar, before he settled on the name under which he is known today: Léon Gaspard. Later, living in the United States, he used the French-sounding last name to create a fictional biography, claiming that his father was Maxim Gaspard, a wealthy merchant of French descent, with whom young Léon traveled to Siberia. This new biography required a new maiden name for Evlyn since it could cast doubts on the veracity of her husband's claim. Therefore, she began using the name Adel(l), which was a shortened version of her mother's maiden name, Adelmann.

When the Great War broke out, Gaspard enlisted in the French Army and was seriously injured the following year. Later, the artist claimed that he served as an aerial observer in the fledgling French aviation. This story is disproved by the photograph of Gaspard in the military uniform. In July 1915, he joined his wife in the United States, where she had been living since May 1915. For the next two years, the couple resided in New York before moving to Chicago in 1918. In 1918, they visited Taos, New Mexico. Gaspard was enchanted by the beauty of this little town, nestled at the foot of the Sangre de Christo mountains. They spend the following two summers in Taos before settling there permanently in the fall of 1921. In 1930, they moved into their own house, a whimsical architectural structure that combines features of a southwestern mudbrick house, a Gothic church, and a Russian peasant hut.

Leon and Evlyn made three transatlantic voyages: to Eastern China and Mongolia in 1921, the Middle East in 1926, and to North Africa (Morocco, Algeria, and Tunis) in 1932-33. Each journey lasted about 5 months, from the day of their departure from the United States to the day of their return. The well-known story of Gaspard's two-and-a-half year-long wanderings through China, Mongolia, and Tibet is untrue. The dates of their departures and arrivals are documented in the contemporary press. His last transatlantic journey took place in 1959 when, after Evlyn's death, the artist married Dora Kaminsky. The newly weds traveled to Egypt, Moscow, and Paris.

Gaspard died of a heart attack on February 21, 1964, and, according to his wishes, was buried on his property. A few years later, his widow Dora Kaminsky-Gaspard-Blackman, reburied his remains at the Sierra Vista Cemetery. His name on the headstone is written as "Leon Maximovich Gaspard." ("Maxim" was name of his father in his fictional biography; in reality, it was the name of his godfather that was given to him at the time of his conversion to the Russian Orthodoxy.)

== Artistic career ==
Schulman debuted at the Salon d'Automne in 1906 and since then became a regular exhibitor; he also regularly exhibited at the Salon des Indépendants. In 1907 he exhibited at the Salon de la Société Nationale des Beaux-Arts (Salon du Champs-de-Mars) and in three times (in 1909, 1910, and 1913) at the Salon des Artistes Français. Together with his friend Abel Pfefferman (Abel Pann), he exhibited at the gallery Maison des Arts in May 1908. In October, Schulman and Pfefferman traveled to Vitebsk, where they exhibited their works together with Pen and Yanina Pavlovskaya. In February 1908, Schulman exhibited with Pen, Pavlovskaya, and Karl Kahl in Mogilev. He participated in group shows at the gallery Georges Petit (December 1911) and gallery Devambez (June 1912) and had two personal exhibitions - at the gallery Boute in Brussels (May 1912) and at the gallery Salle Arti in Antwerp (November 1912).

After his arrival in the United States, Gaspard actively exhibited his work at personal and group exhibitions, many of them at such prestigious venues at the National Academy of Design, the Art Institute of Chicago, the Corcoran Gallery, and at the international exhibitions at Carnegie Institute, Till 1921, his dealer was Reinhardt's Galleries that had branches in both New York and Chicago and after 1921 Milch Galleries in New York. Since 1936, he also exhibited and sold work at the Stendahl's Galleries in Los Angeles.

Gaspard found artistic success in Taos, where Gaspard moved in 1918 and remained until his death. Unlike many of his contemporaries, Gaspard continued to paint Russia, and far off places, rather than focus on the local Native Americans and landscape. Though an anomaly, Gaspard's work was respected; in 1961, Gaspard had a one-man show in Taos. His work sold steadily in New York City, Detroit, Los Angeles and San Francisco, and he was well-known and financially successful.

== Posthumous reputation ==
In 1965, the Museum of New Mexico's art museum held a retrospective exhibition of Gaspard in his memory. In 1967, three years after Gaspard's death, the Maxwell Galleries held a retrospective exhibition of his work. His post-humous reputation began to take shape in 1982, with a retrospective exhibition by the Fenn Galleries in Santa Fe (now Nedra Matteucci Galleries). In November 2013, Nedra Matteucci Galleries held another major exhibition for the artist, Leon Gaspard: Impressions from Russia and the Faraway. The following galleries have also held major posthumous exhibitions: Hammer Galleries, New York (1968), Gerald Peters Gallery, Santa Fe (1984), and Berry-Hill Galleries, New York (1986). Gaspard's work has sold well at auction houses, and in the early 2000s, prices for his paintings increased dramatically. On November 29, 2007, the 1918 painting, The Finish of the Kermesse was sold at Christie's for $2,001,000.
