= Harry Gottlieb =

American painter (1895–1992)

- Born: September 23, 1895; Bucharest, Romania
- Died: July 4, 1992 (aged 97); New York City
- Known for: printmaker

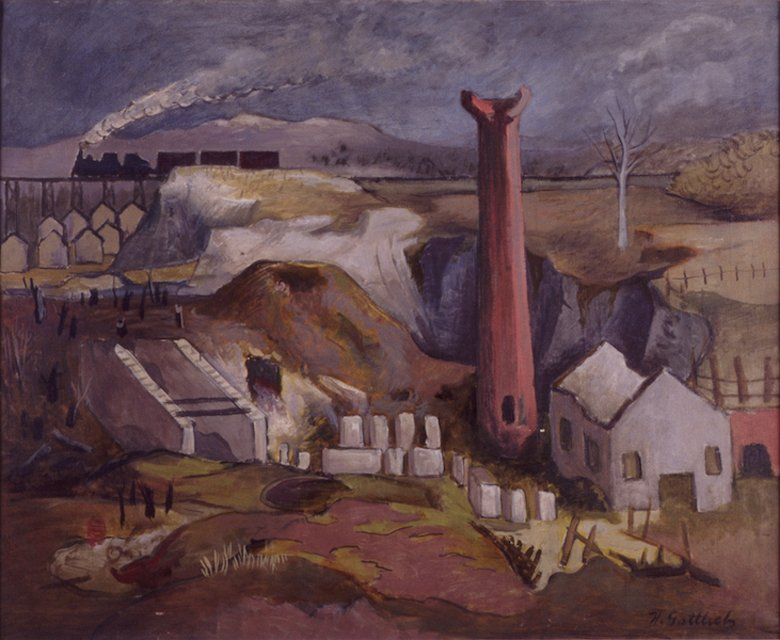
Ruins Along the Hudson by Harry Gottlieb, c. 1937, oil on canvas, WPA Collection, Oklahoma City Museum of Art

Harry Gottlieb (September 23, 1895 – July 4, 1992) was an American painter, printmaker and educator associated with Social Realism and the Works Progress Administration. He was an early practitioner of screen printing as a fine-art medium and participated in the Federal Art Project during the 1930s.

== Biography ==
Gottlieb was born in Bucharest, Romania on September 23, 1895. He immigrated to America in 1907, and his family settled in Minneapolis. His family was Jewish.

From 1915 to 1917, Gottlieb attended the Minneapolis Institute of Arts, where he became friends with Wanda Gág, later known as a famous illustrator. After a short stint as an illustrator for the U.S. Navy, Gottlieb moved to New York City; he became a scenic and costume designer for Eugene O'Neill's Provincetown Theater Group. He also studied at the Philadelphia Academy of Fine Arts and the National Academy of Design.

== Career ==
Gottlieb was one of America's first Social Realist painters, influenced by the Robert Henri-led movement in New York City where Gottlieb settled in 1918. He was also a pioneer in screen printing, which he learned while working for the Works Progress Administration (WPA).

In 1935, he joined the Federal Art Project (FAP); he was one of the first members of the WPA/FAP's Silk Screen Unit, along with Anthony Velonis, Elizabeth Olds, Hyman Warsager and other fellow printmakers. Gottlieb remained active as a painter and screen printer after the closure of the Federal Art Project, and served as the first director of the short-lived American Artists School in New York City. Gottlieb was a leader and active member of the Artists Union and the Artists Congress.

Art historian Helen Langa writes: "The WPA Federal Art Project opened the Harlem Community Art Center in 1937, one of four WPA-FAP Community Art Centers set up in New York. (WPA artist) Riva Helfond was brought in to set up the Center’s printmaking program. By 1939 students were studying woodcut, linocut, and lithographic techniques, and silkscreen printing was taught informally by Harry Gottlieb. . . . Gottlieb was especially respected for his support of African American causes in the Artist’s Union and American Artists’ Congress.”

In a 1988 interview with art historian Mary Francey, Gottlieb "reiterated the views of most (Federal Art) Project printmakers that, although poverty and hunger were obvious social concerns, still the Depression years were a period of unusual creativity and productivity for artists. The benefits of working in groups in workshops, and the exchange of ideas was unprecedented and stimulating".

He lectured widely on art education and promoted the government support of artist and artistic projects.

Interest in silkscreen printmaking was growing in the years leading up to 1940. Art historian James Watrous wrote in 1984: "The mounting interest in printmaking with silkscreen was affirmed by several other events that occurred around the turn of the decade. In March 1940, the ACA (American Contemporary Art) Gallery sponsored the second one-man show of silkscreens, a display of prints by Harry Gottlieb. Among the twelve works was Winter on the Creek, elaborately printed with eleven colors that projected a picturesque scene of ice skaters in a seasonal American landscape. It was dependent upon painting for its conceptual characteristics, but the screen-printing process fell within the definition of an original print and, in 1942, Gottlieb's work received the Eyre Medal for the best print in the 40th Annual Exhibition of Watercolors and Prints at the Pennsylvania Academy of the Fine Arts." The allure of seeking "painterly" effects in screen printing was strong to some of the artists who worked in silkscreen in the late 1930's. Gottlieb and other artists, including Warsager and Leonard Pytlak, "often chose to ignore a graphic aesthetic and seized the opportunity to use many screens, colors and complex printings in order to simulate the nuances and illusions that usually had been reserved for watercolors and oils."

=== Making art for a wider audience ===
Gottlieb believed that fine art should be more widely available to the public and, like some other WPA printmakers, he felt that screen printing was a move in that direction because screen printing equipment was less expensive and lighter than other means of creating prints, and it could allow an artist to turn out numerous prints at relatively affordable prices. Gottlieb said at the time: "The American people cannot afford oil paintings, or even watercolors, yet they want pictures in their homes. The sharecropper tacks up pictures from the Sunday paper; screen prints can provide an art that people can afford to buy."

=== Exhibits and Museum Collections ===
Gottlieb was included in the 1944 Dallas Museum of Fine Arts exhibition of the National Serigraph Society.

His work is in the collections of the Metropolitan Museum of Art in New York City, the Brooklyn Museum, the Whitney Museum, The Philadelphia Museum of Art, the Museum of Modern Art, the Amon Carter Museum of American Art, the Princeton University Art Museum, and the Smithsonian American Art Museum.

== Personal life ==
Gottlieb married Russian born artist and sculptor Eugenie Gershoy, and the couple joined the artist colony at Woodstock, New York. In 1923, Gottlieb settled in Woodstock, New York and in 1931, spent a year abroad studying under a Guggenheim Fellowship.

Gottlieb was an adherent of the political theories of Karl Marx and joined the Communist Party in the 1930s, remaining a lifelong member of the party.
