= Anthony Velonis =

American painter (1911–1997)

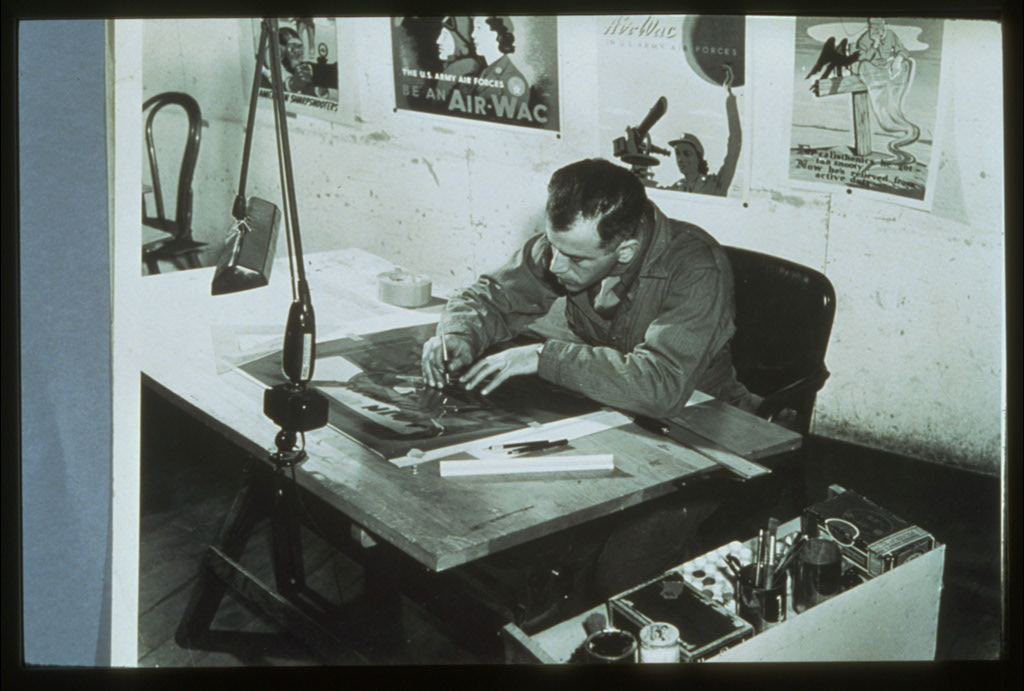
- Anthony Velonis working on a poster matrix in Lowry Field, Denver, Colorado.
- Born: October 23, 1911; New York
- Died: October 29, 1997 (aged 86); Glen Rock, New Jersey
- Known for: Silkscreen Printing
- Spouse: Elizabeth Amidon

Anthony Velonis (23 October 1911 – 29 October 1997) was an American painter and designer born in New York City who helped introduce the public to silkscreen printing in the early 20th century. He married Elizabeth Amidon, with whom he had four children.

While employed under the federal Works Progress Administration during the Great Depression, Velonis brought the use of silkscreen printing as a fine art form, referred to as the "serigraph," into the mainstream. By his own request, he was not publicly credited for coining the term.

He experimented and mastered techniques to print on a wide variety of materials, such as glass, plastics, and metal, thereby expanding the field. In the mid to late 20th century, the silkscreen technique became popular among other artists such as Robert Rauschenberg and Andy Warhol.

== Early life ==
Velonis was born into a relatively poor background of a Greek immigrant family and grew up in the tenements of New York City. Early on, he took creative inspiration from figures in his life such as his grandfather, an immigrant from the mountains in Greece, who was "an ecclesiastical painter, on Byzantine style." The eldest of four children, Velonis attended James Monroe High School in The Bronx, where he took on minor artistic roles such as the illustration of his high school yearbook. He eventually received a scholarship to the NYU College of Fine Arts, into which he was both surprised and ecstatic to have been admitted. Around this time he took to painting, watercolor, and sculpture, as well as various other art forms, hoping to find a niche that fit. He attended NYU until 1929, when the Great Depression started in the United States after the stock market crash.

Around the year 1932, Velonis became interested in silk screen, together with fellow artist Fritz Brosius, and decided to investigate the practice. Working in his brother's sign shop, Velonis was able to master the silkscreen process. He reminisced in an interview three decades later that doing so was "plenty of fun," and that a lot of technology can be discovered through hard work, more so if it is worked on "little by little."

Velonis was hired by Mayor LaGuardia in 1934 to promote the work of New York's city government via posters publicizing city projects. One such project required him to go on a commercial fishing trip to locations including New Bedford and Nantucket for a fortnight, where he primarily took photographs and notes, and made sketches. Afterward, for a period of roughly six months, he was occupied with creating paintings from these records. During this trip, Velonis developed true respect and affinity for the fishermen with whom he traveled, "the relatively uneducated person," in his words.

Following this, Velonis began work with the Public Works of Art Project (PWAP), an offshoot of the Civil Works Administration (CWA), where he was assigned to serve the different city departments of New York. After the formation of the federal Works Progress Administration, which hired artists and sponsored projects in the arts, he also worked in theater.

== WPA ==
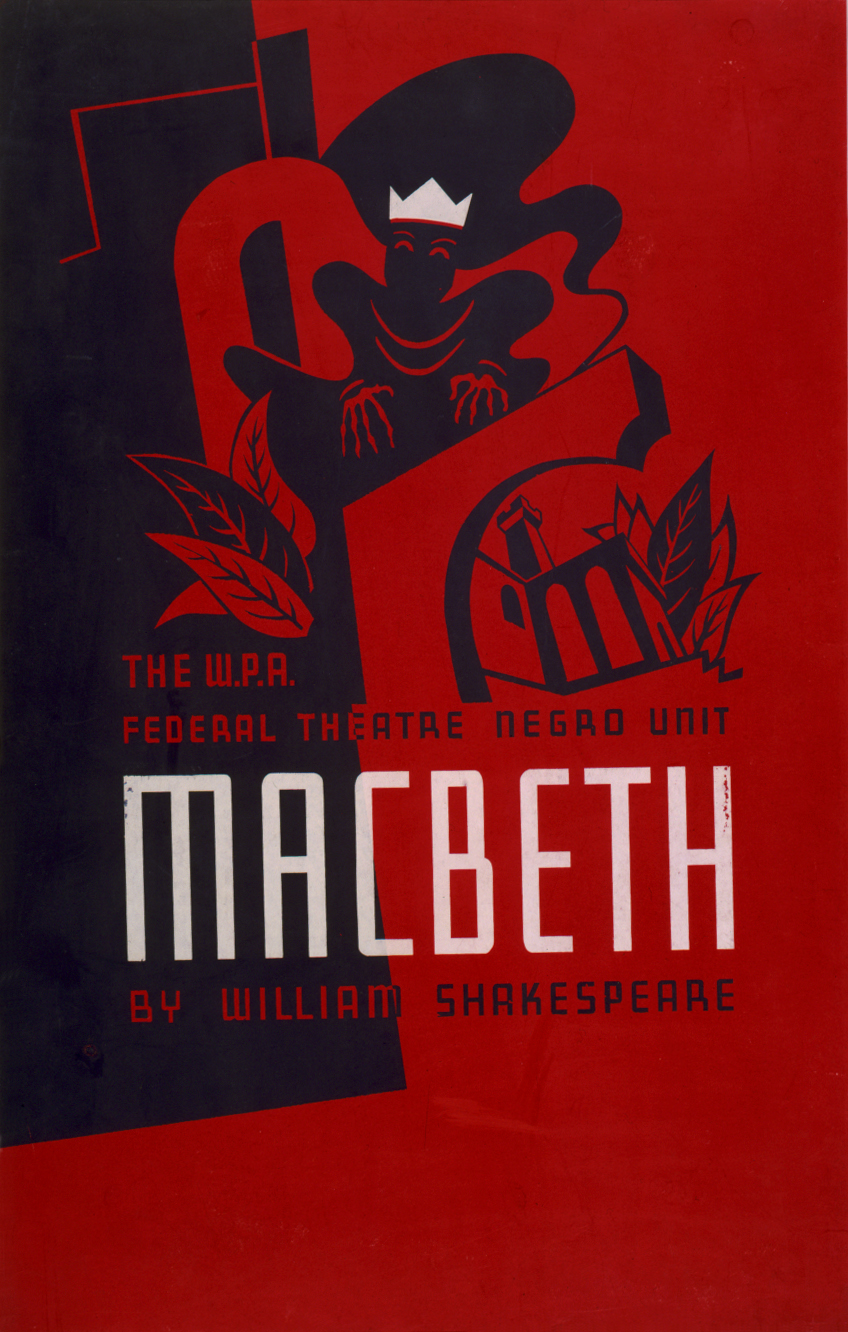
Lafayette Theater in Harlem

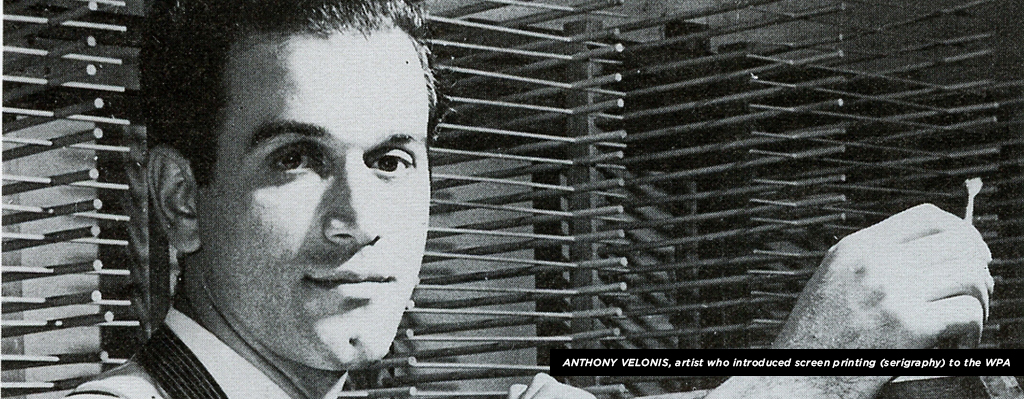
A portrait of Velonis, likely created during the 1930s.

Velonis began working for the federal WPA in 1935. He kept this position until 1936 or 1938, at which point he began working in the graphic art division of the Federal Art Project, which he ultimately led.

Under the leadership of Velonis, "The team of six artists at the Graphic Arts Division who pioneered new screen-print technologies included Harry Gottlieb, Louis Lozowick, Eugene Morley, Elizabeth Olds, and Hyman Warsager". Under various elements of the WPA program, many young artists, writers and actors gained employment that helped them survive during the Depression, as well as contributing works that created an artistic legacy for the country.

When interviewed in December 1994 by the Library of Congress about his time in the WPA, Velonis reflected that he had greatly enjoyed that period, saying that he liked the "excitement" and "meeting all the other artists with different points of view." He also said in a later interview that "the contact and the dialogue with all those artists and the work that took place was just invaluable." Among the young artists he hired was Edmond Casarella, who later developed an innovative technique using layered cardboard for woodcuts.

Velonis introduced silkscreen printing to the Poster Division of the WPA. As he recalled in a 1965 interview:

"I suggested that the Poster division would be a lot more productive and useful if they had an auxiliary screen printing project that worked along with them. And apparently this was very favorably received..."

As a member of the Federal Art Project, a subdivision of the WPA, Velonis later approached the Public Use of Arts Committee (PUAC) for help in "propagandizing for art in the parks, in the subways, et cetera." Since the Federal Art Project could not be "self-promoting," an outside organization was required to advertise their art more extensively. During his employment with the Federal Art Project, Velonis created nine silkscreen posters for the federal government.

Around 1937–1939, Velonis wrote a pamphlet titled "Technical Problems of the Artist: Technique of the Silkscreen Process," which was distributed to art centers run by the WPA around the country. It was considered very influential in encouraging artists to try this relatively inexpensive technique and stimulated printmaking across the country. Art historian Mary Francey wrote, "The demand for the two instructional manuals Velonis wrote that described the process in detail was so great that mimeographed copies were made available to artists nationwide. Because it required simple, inexpensive equipment, screen printing had immediate and widespread appeal. More important, artists printed their own images, thereby re-establishing the direct relationship between idea and process that intervention by master printers in etching and lithography had altered."

In 1996, the Metropolitan Museum of Art held an exhibition titled W.P.A. Color Prints: Images from the Federal Art Project. In the news release announcing the exhibition the museum said: "Although artists on the Federal Art Project produced color prints in all media, they were also instrumental in developing new printmaking techniques such as the carborundum etching and the screen print process. As printmaker Hyman Warsager recalled of his experience in the Graphic Arts Division of the W.P.A., 'The most startling contribution to color printmaking was added by the use of the silk screen'. Citing the pioneering efforts of artist Anthony Velonis, who initially spearheaded the use of the silk screen technique in the Poster Division of the W.P.A., for recognizing the possibilities of the medium, Warsager noted that the 'economy and ease of this process enabled the artist to employ sixteen to twenty colors to a print, whereas color lithography and wood block are limited to far fewer colors by both expense and labor'. Two examples of Velonis’s screen prints, including 6:30 p.m. (1938), which was executed as a bravura demonstration of the medium to convince W.P.A. administrators that the technique was suited to the creation of fine prints, and Half-ton Fish (1938), appear in the exhibition. Velonis was dedicated to disseminating the screen print process to American printmakers, many of whom made their first screen prints in the workshops sponsored by the Federal Art Project."

=== Reflections of an Eminent Curator, 1941 ===
In 1941 Carl Zigrosser, the "eminent" Curator of Prints, Drawings and Rare Books at the Philadelphia Museum of Art, wrote in his essay The Serigraph, A New Medium: “In 1935 the Federal Art Project opened a Poster Division in New York to supply posters for different branches of the Project and for other government agencies. It has been successful both as to quality and efficiency under the direction of Richard Floethe and has produced since its inception many hundred thousands of posters by the silk screen process. Attached to the staff of the Poster Division was a young artist, Anthony Velonis. He was thoroughly familiar with every aspect of silk screen technique, having previously worked in commercial shops; and he became more and more struck with its possibilities as a color print medium for artists. He was aware of the growing popularity of color woodcuts and color lithographs produced on the Project by means of expensive technical equipment beyond the means of the average artist, and he set out to perfect a more fluent and less expensive color printing process. Encouraged by the Project, he and other artists experimented with the new technique and adapted it to the artists’ needs.”

Zigrosser continued: "Late in 1938, in spite of some opposition and through the missionary work of the Public Use of Arts Committee and the United American Artists, a separate Silk Screen Unit, with Anthony Velonis at its head, was established as a branch of the Graphic Section of the New York City W.P.A. Art Project. There Velonis taught and gave technical advice to many artists."

While Velonis and the other artists on the project did not "invent" a new technique, they creatively and collectively adapted an existing one. Zigrosser wrote: "It is the virtue of Velonis and his associates on the Project that they achieved the momentum of a collective enterprise. Instead of working laboriously and independently at discovering one and the same thing, they pooled their discoveries and went beyond them. It is the particular virtue of Velonis that with a technical equipment surpassing the others, he was able to lay down a method that worked most simply and efficiently for artists. It is his organizing and adapting ability that has made the serigraph possible for artists, and it is the collective momentum of himself and his associates that has spread the knowledge to all parts of the country."

== Creative Printmakers Group, the National Serigraph Society, and the Ceraglass Company ==
In 1939, Velonis founded the Creative Printmakers Group, along with three others, including Hyman Warsager. They printed both their own works and those of other artists in their facility. This was considered the most important silkscreen shop of the period.

The next year, Velonis, Max Arthur Cohn, Warsager, and other artists co-founded the National Serigraph Society. It started out with relatively small commercial projects, such as "rather fancy" Christmas cards that were sold to many of the upscale Fifth Avenue shops for a dollar apiece.

In 1940 Velonis and Warsager also founded the Ceraglass Company, a silkscreening firm intended to experiment with silkscreen prints on glass and plastic. Over time, the company grew and completed larger-scale works for organizations such as the Metropolitan Museum of Art, Tiffany's, and the now-defunct Hyperion Press. Eventually, such outreach led to expansion into the glass industry. Using enamels, Velonis and Warsager were able to print on flat bottles in a fashion similar to printing on paper; the company later patented the method of printing on both sides of the flat bottle. While beginning as a minor side project, the new method of glass printing was very successful. The company recorded profits of about $25,000 in the first year alone, taking it in a new direction:

"And we rationalized this whole thing by saying, well, what the devil, life is nothing but a round of cocktail parties and manoeuvering and much paranoia of pushing yourself, and -- let's be honest, the heck with it, let's paint when we feel like it and as we feel it, without any commercial intent at all; and let's make our money otherwise."

Velonis and Warsager were partners and operated Ceraglass and a related company called Ceragraphic until they sold the firm to VCA Corporation in 1969.

== World War II ==
The United States' entry into World War II resulted in a general lack of materials for commercial usage, causing the company to begin printing on plastics as an alternative. Most attempts by other organizations to make prints stick permanently on plastics were unsuccessful; however, Velonis was able to find a solution. By dissolving a resin made from ground-up lipsticks, he was able to facilitate the grinding of pigments more effectively, allowing for the paint to stick due to the migrating plasticizer within it.

In 1942, Velonis was drafted into the United States Army Air Forces. Velonis' colleague Hyman Warsager had been drafted into the military previously, and was assigned to Lowry Field, where he worked on projects related to graphics arts, photography, and printing. After Velonis was drafted, Warsager persuaded his commanding officer to write a letter of introduction to place Velonis in the same position. During this time, Velonis expanded military programs such as screen processing and graphic arts. Later, during his time in Wright Field, Velonis was placed in the statistical control department, where he worked in management engineering. His department focused on formatting raw data into more accessible visuals, such as graphs and other such illustrations.

== Career ==
After the war ended, Velonis returned to the company he co-founded with Warsager, which had since grown to roughly one hundred employees. While moderately successful overall, he later described the business as being "on and off."

Velonis continued to engineer printing on various materials such as metals. He focused on metals secondarily due to a lack of demand for metal prints. He also experimented with techniques in stained glass, creating a large 2'x8'15" -panel display for the American Museum of Natural History in New York City around 1965.

As a result of these events, Velonis focused less on painting between around 1939-1965. He attributed his lack of "creative energy" in this time period, regarding paintings in particular, to his work in engineering projects such as printing on plastics. He said this work required him to "apply yourself day in and day out" for acceptable results.

== Legacy ==
Since 1998, the Society of Glass and Ceramic Decorators, of which Velonis was the second president, has hosted an annual scholarship award in Velonis' name, called the Tony Velonis Memorial Scholarship. The scholarship is offered to undergraduate or graduate students studying "glass, ceramic or related curriculum including engineering, design or art."

== Exhibitions ==
Velonis' art has appeared in a number of exhibitions in the northeastern United States, including the following:

- Museum of Modern Art, 1936
- Weyhe Gallery, New York, 1940
- Museum of Modern Art, 1940
- Brooklyn Museum, 1940
- Springfield Museum of Fine Arts, Massachusetts, 1940
- American Museum of Natural History, New York
- Philadelphia Museum of Art, 1971
- Brooklyn Museum, 1986
- National Academy of Design in the Addison Gallery of American Art, 1989
- Metropolitan Museum of Art, 1996
- Addison Gallery of American Art, 2013
- Philadelphia Museum of Art, 2016
- Philadelphia Museum of Art, 2025

== Gallery ==
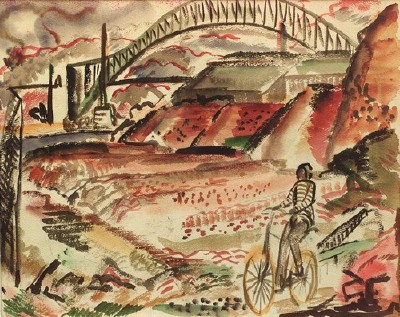
(1934) Painting of the Brooklyn Bridge in New York City

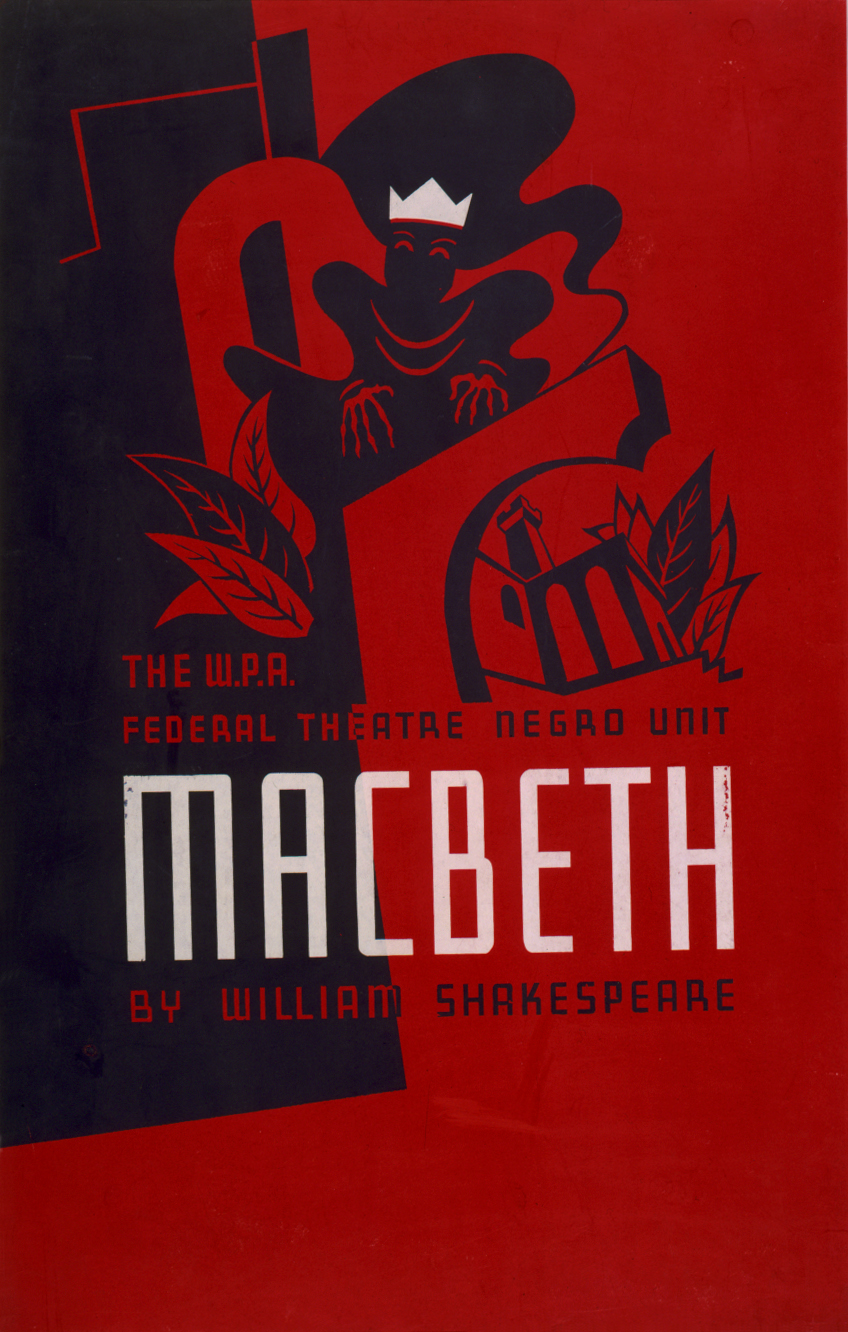
(14 Apr. 1936) Poster for Federal Theatre Project presentation of William Shakespeare's Macbeth

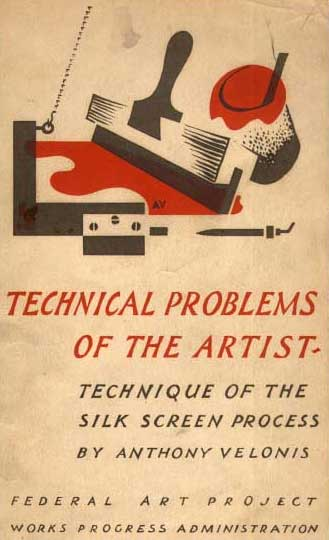
(1937) The cover of Velonis' pamphlet, "Technical Problems of the Artist: Technique of the Silkscreen Process"

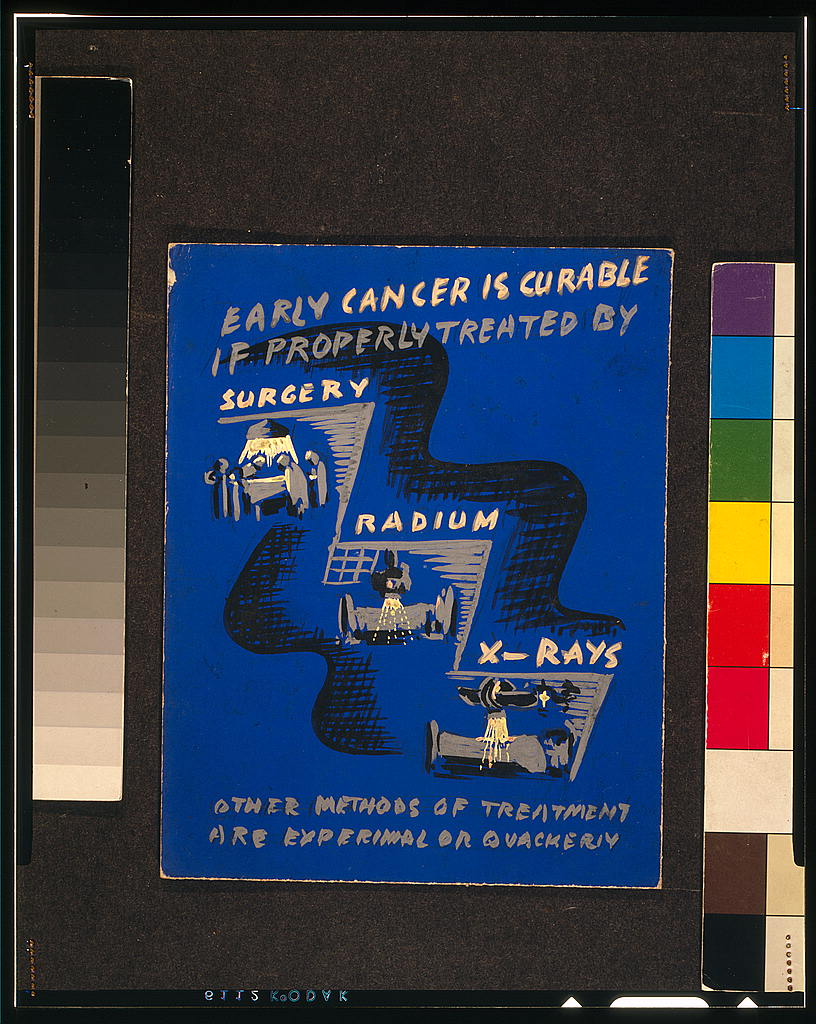
(1937) Poster urging citizens to get early diagnosis of cancer

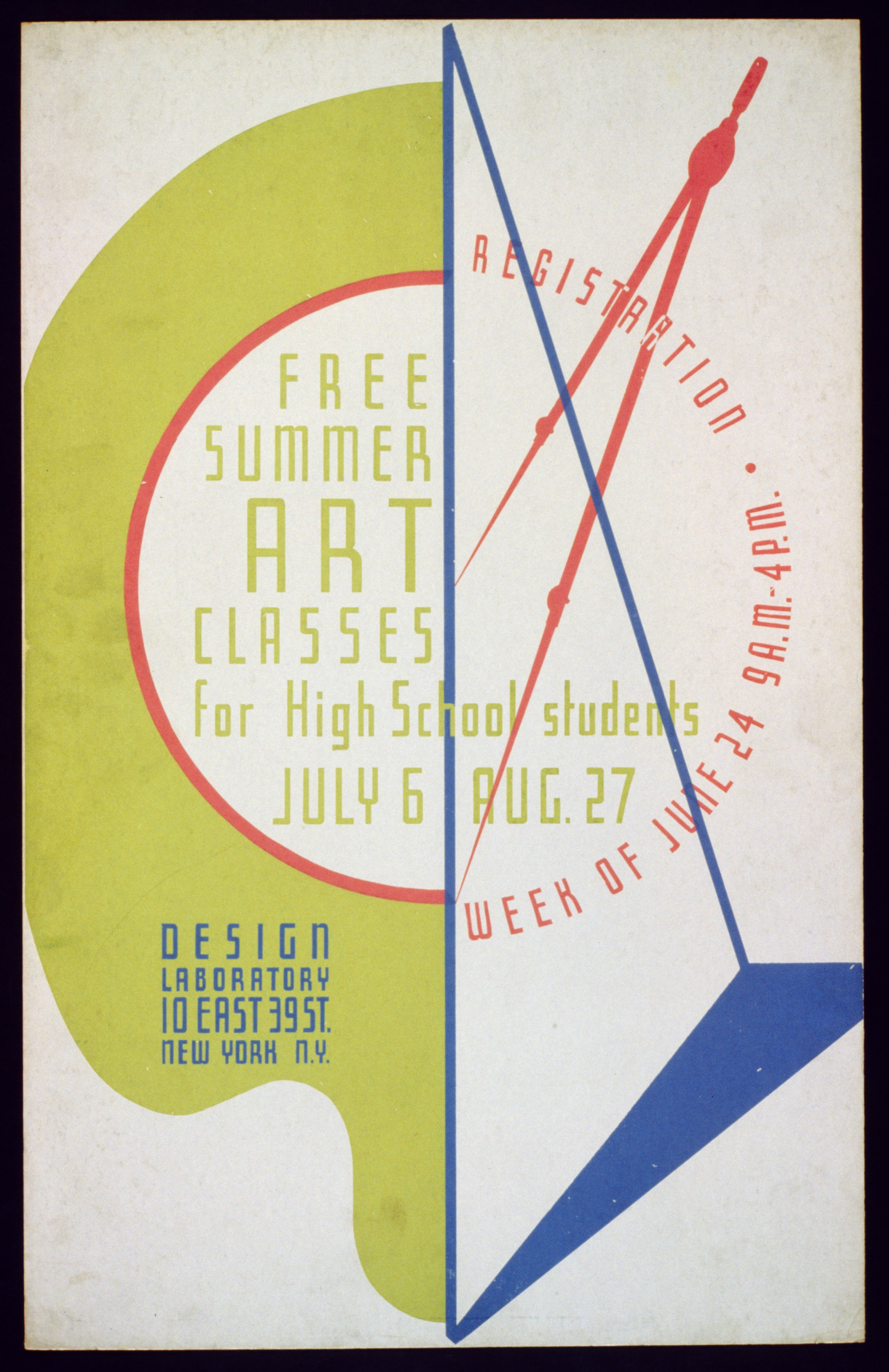
(1936-1938) Poster advertising free summer art classes for students in high school

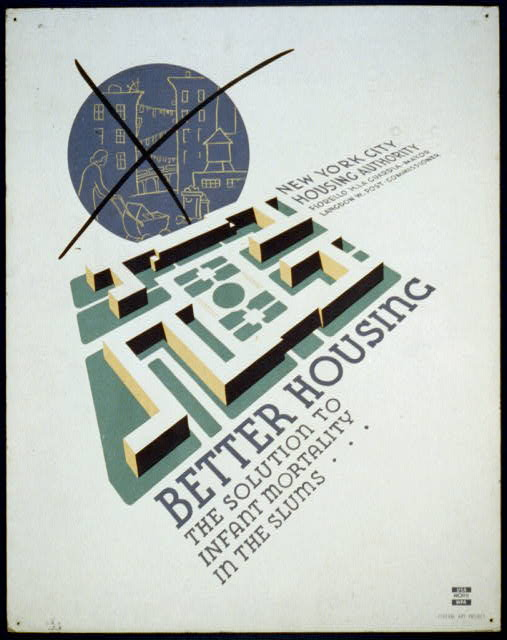
(1936-1938) Poster encouraging support for better housing infrastructure to prevent infant mortality in low-income areas

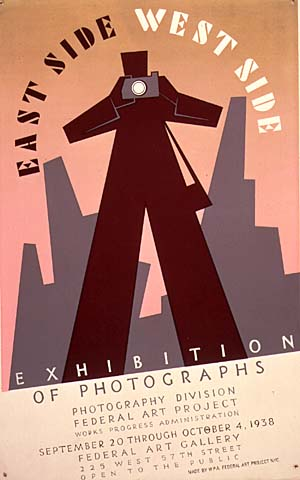
(Sept. 1938) Poster for Federal Art Project Photography Division exhibition, showing man taking photograph, New York City buildings in background

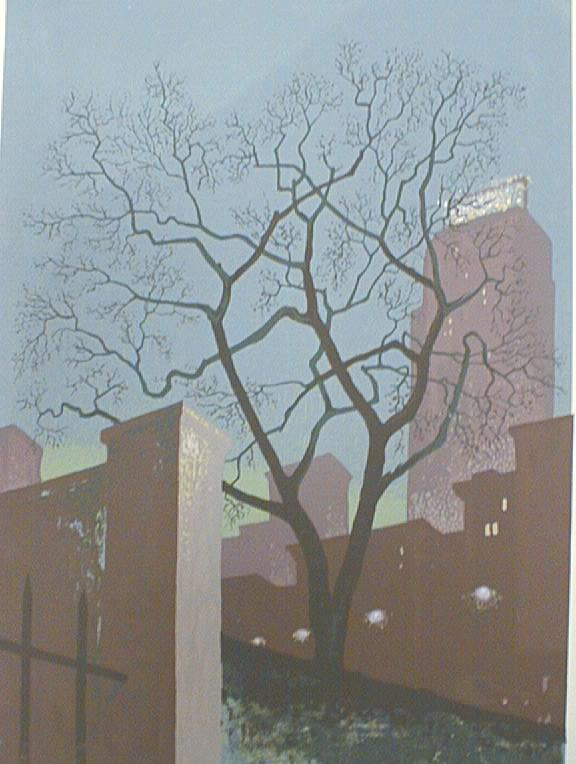
(1938) 6:30 P.M.

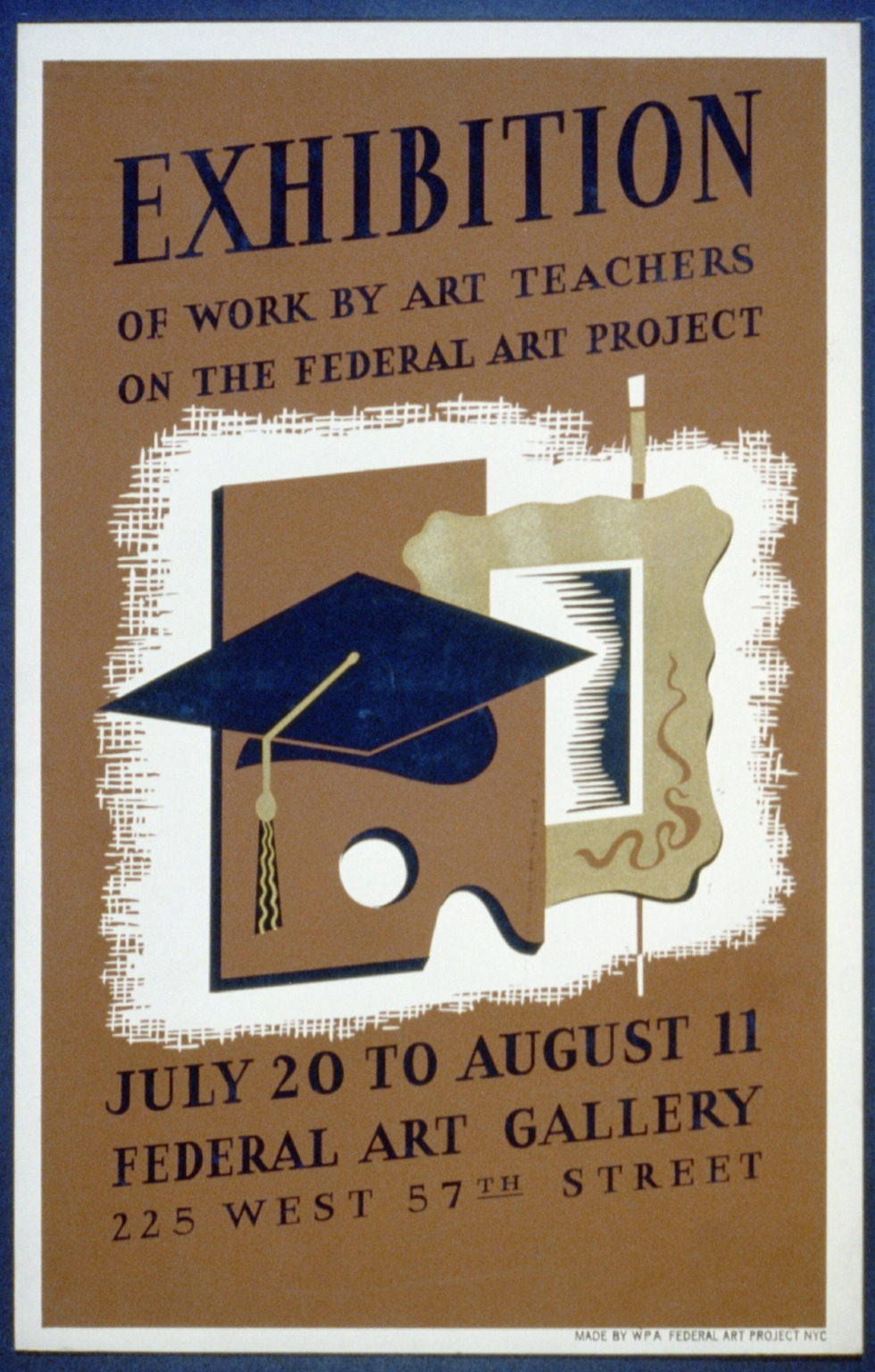
(1938) Poster advertising art created by art teachers under the Federal Art Project

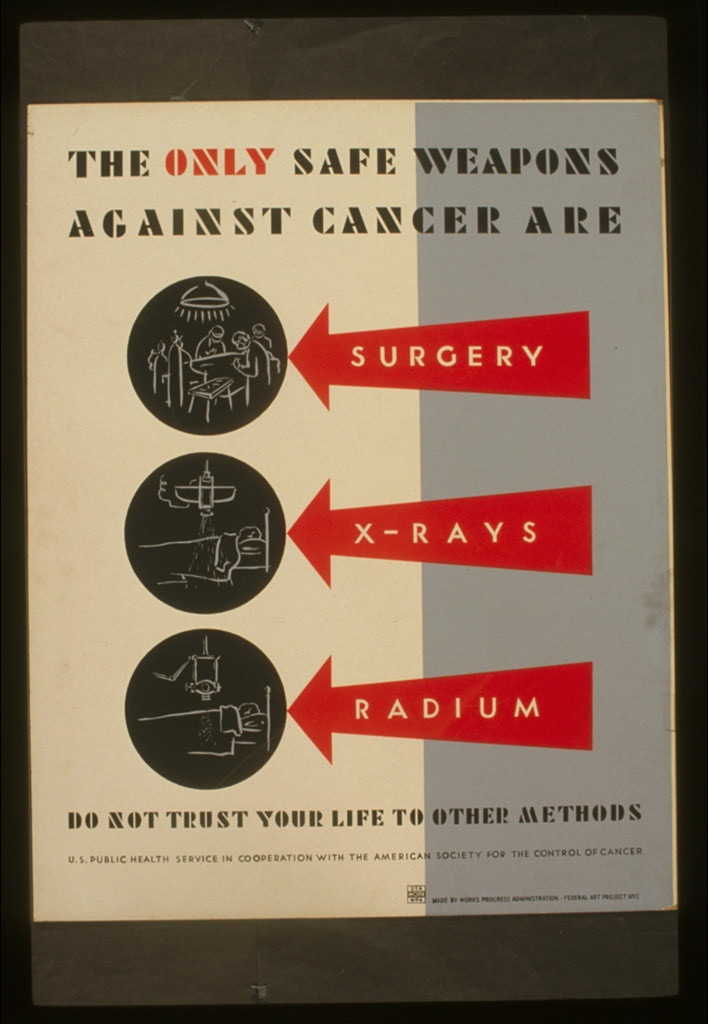
(1938) Poster urging citizens to use approved cancer treatment

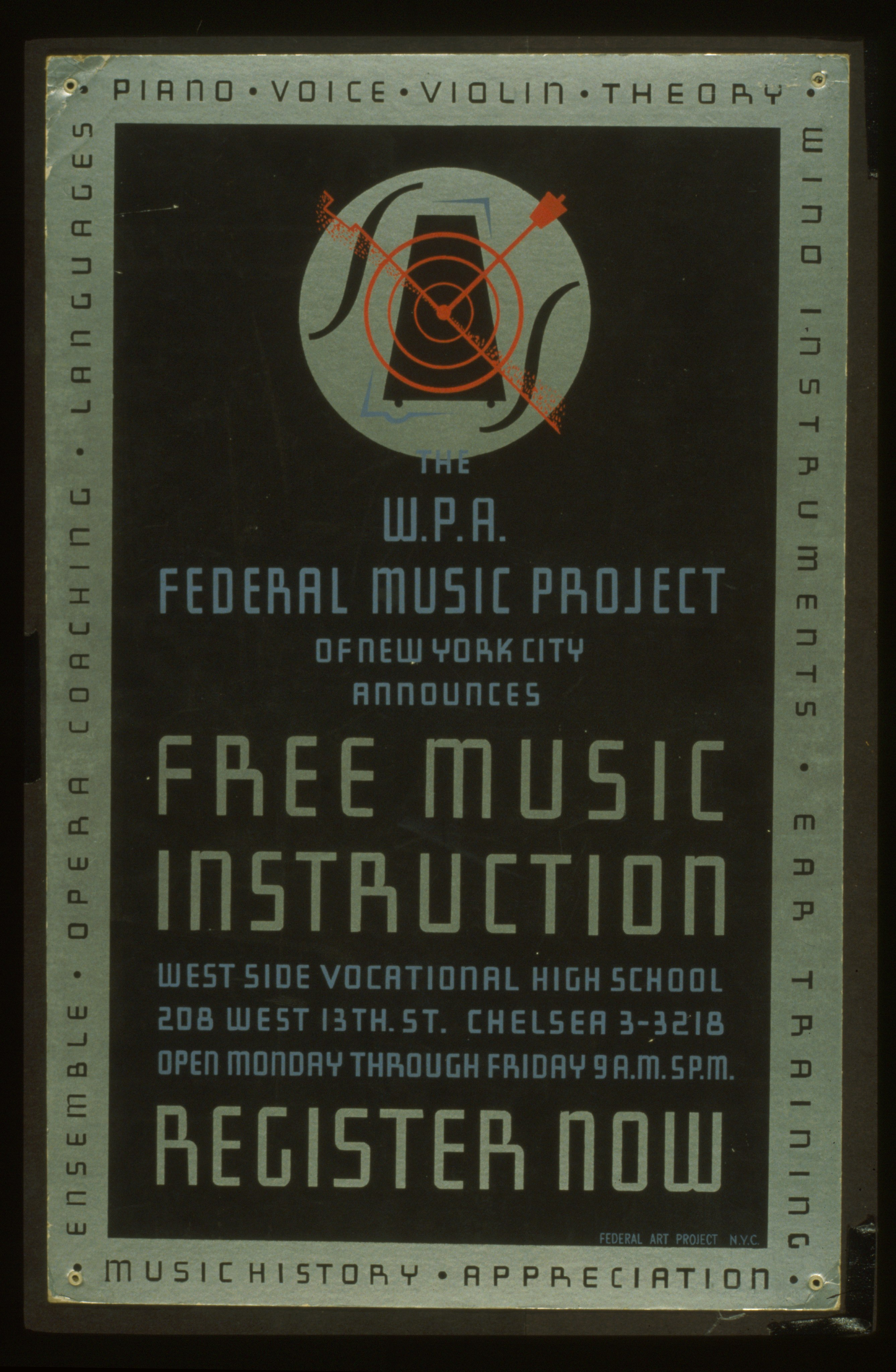
(1938) Poster advertising a free music instruction opportunity

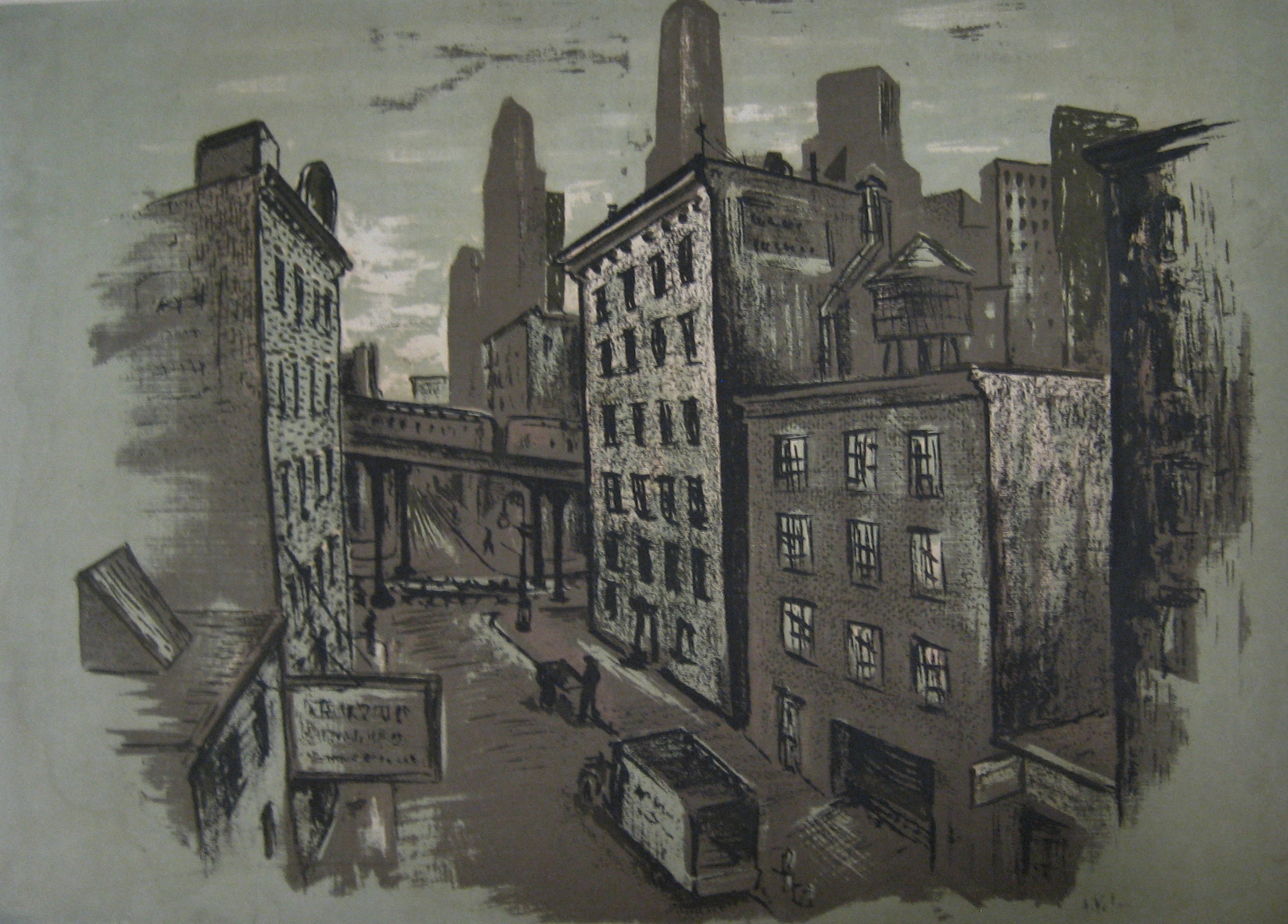
(1936–42) Side Street

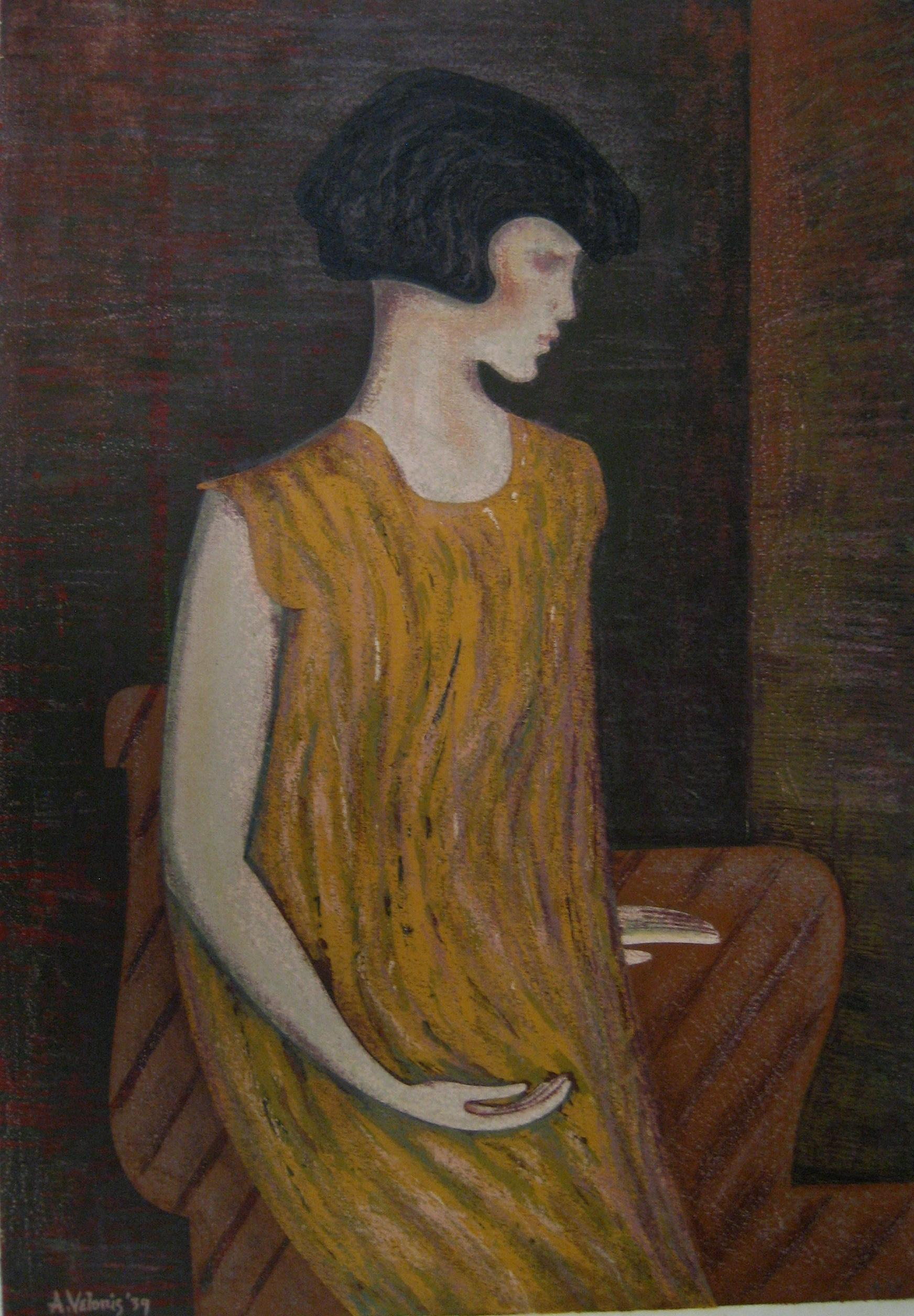
(1939) "Young Girl," a stylization of a photograph of Velonis' wife, Elizabeth.

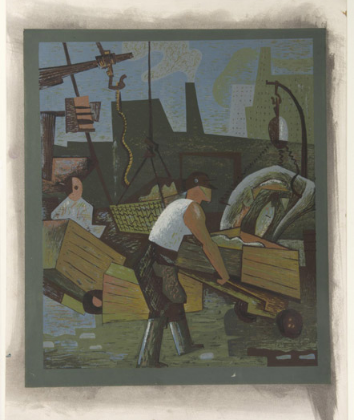
(1939) "Unloading Fish"

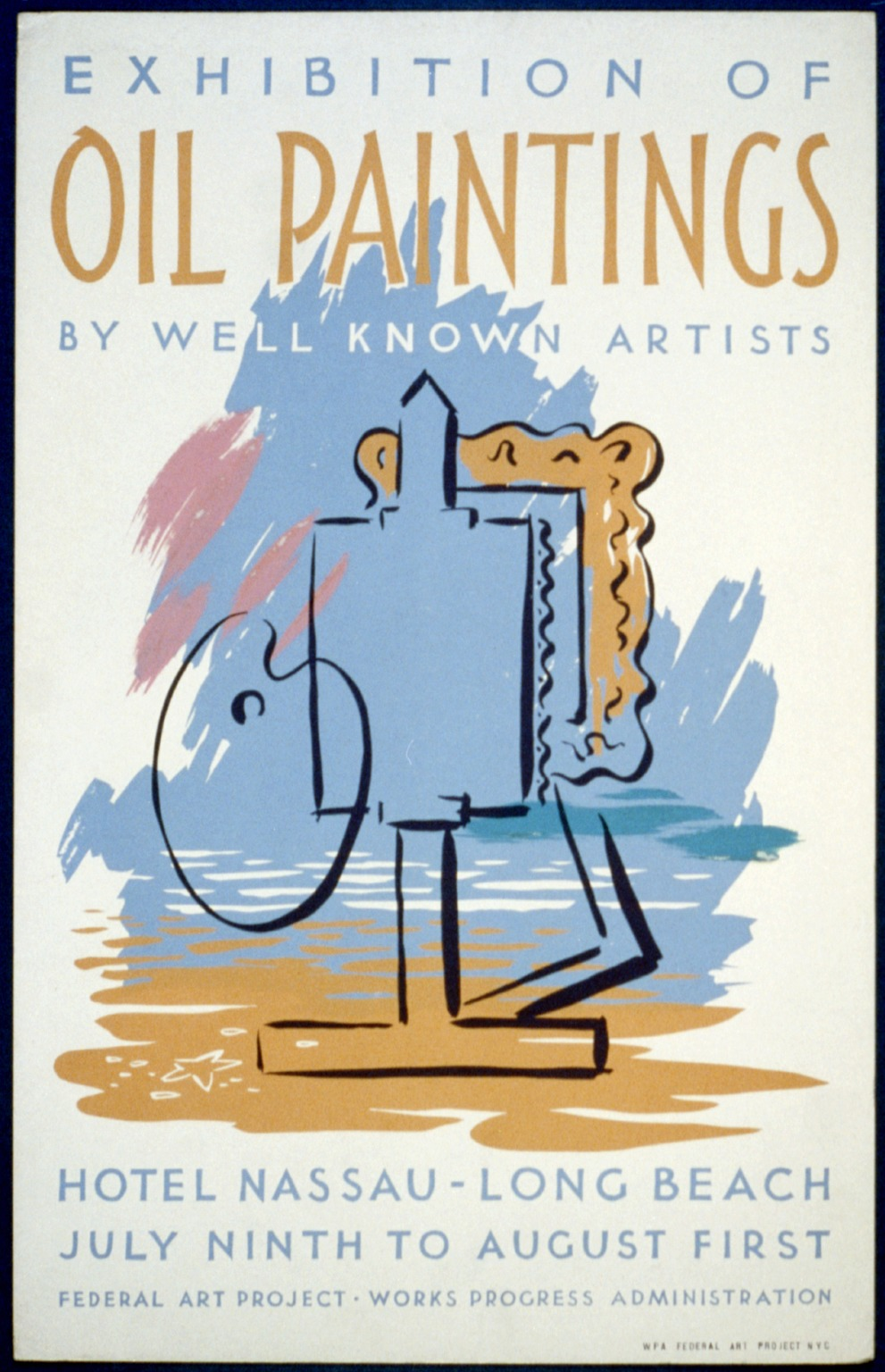
(1940) Poster advertising an exhibition of oil paintings by well-known artists

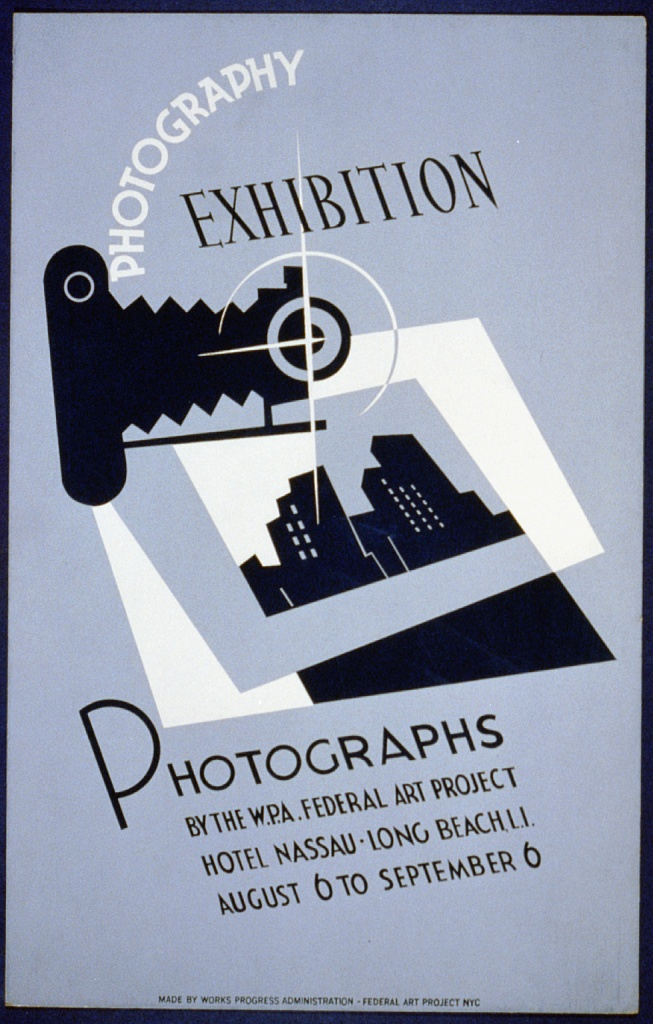
(1941) Poster advertising a photography exhibition
