= Sarah Berman (artist) =

American painter (1895–1957)

- Born: Sarah Ostrowsky; 1895
- Died: 1957 (aged 61–62)
- Education: Self taught. No formal education
- Known for: Naïve Art; Social Realism; Folk Art; Painting; Printmaking; Lithography; Etchings
- Style: Primitive; Illustrative; Human Fantasy
- Spouse: Leivi Berman (m. 1919)

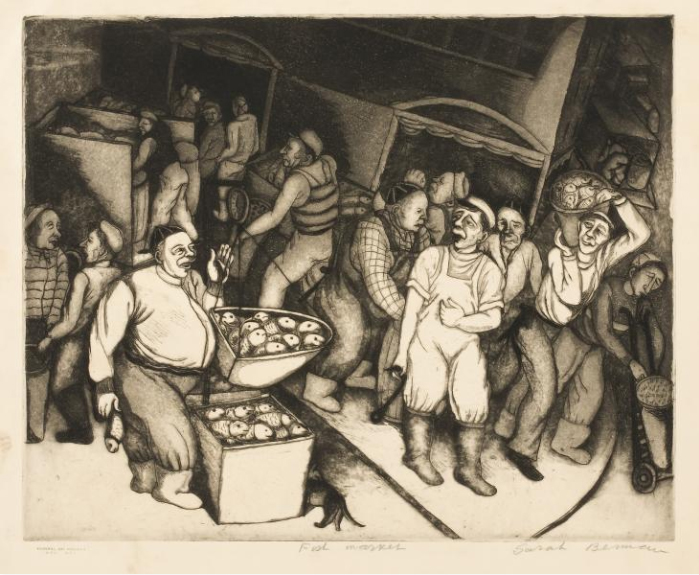
Fish Market, c. 1939

Sarah Berman (née Ostrowsky; 1895–1957) was a Ukrainian American self-taught Naïve artist and primitive Social Realist whose career began in New York City during the late 1910’s and remained active until her death in 1957. Sarah's works are notable for her primitive human fantasy scenes along with her depictions of social realism and illustrative political commentary. Berman's greatest works are those that showcase the different, naïve social fantasy she was capable of articulating. Although her works are in many museums, Sarah Berman chose to never sell a piece of art.

“It is not everyday that an art exhibition starts all the strings humming inside of you. But Sarah Berman’s show… does just that. Fluent, quick, expressive lines transform common place domesticity into something rare and glorious… she paints these people with a reverence and a love that is almost holy…it is a wonderful feeling. She never had an art lesson. She found her sanctuary in her Union Square studio, far from fellow artists. Her art grew into a religion… SO deep set, she forgets she rarely sells a picture. There is bliss within and without"

as Elizabeth Sacartoff described in 1941 for The New York Times.

== Biography ==
Sarah Ostrowsky was a Ukrainian American self-taught Naïve artist and primitive Social Realist painter and printmaker whose career began in New York City during the late 1910’s and remained active until her death in 1957. During her life and career, Sarah was highly critiqued and acclaimed by numerous art critics, enthusiastically placing her works alongside the “Maitres Populaires de la Realite” family of European self-taught artists, ranging from Henri Rousseau and Camille Bombois, and to others like Edward Hicks and John Kane. Despite her primitive aesthetic, Berman has also been favourably compared to 19th Century artists Honoré Daumier and Thomas Rowlandson in her depictions of highly detailed social realism scenes and illustrative political commentary, mostly within her smaller prints, drawings and sketches.

Due to her proximity to many other trained artists in New York at the time, along with her successful mastery of memory painting, Sarah is sometimes thought of as an Ashcan School disciple rather than the much deeper, imaginative Naïve artist she was. Although numerous mid life works of Berman's may resemble those of highly trained 20th century social realists like Reginald Marsh, John Sloan, or Raphael Soyer, her greatest works are those that showcase the different, innocent human fantasy she was capable of articulating. Even with these notable comparisons and success in showing her work, Berman chose to never sell a piece of art, as her creations came from an intensely personal place driven by her “untrammelled imagination”, as Henry McBride described in 1932.

Sarah Berman was born Sasha Ostrovsky, the second of six children and only daughter in a Jewish household in Romny, Ukraine. Her family suffered violent religious persecution during the Russian Pogroms of 1905, with Sasha discovering the dismembered body of her uncle after the wave of violence had passed through their town. She fled to the US at age 12, first to Philadelphia before moving to New York City two years later. There, she married the Yiddish poet Leivi Berman in 1919. They had no children, where they lived in her studio in the tenements on the Lower East Side and later at Union Square, where she died.

Sarah's career was extensive. Her works are best known for capturing the Naïve human fantasy she dreamt of while also depicting “primitive" New York centric social realism scenes. Her work ranges from 1912 through 1957, from the tenement life of the Lower East Side and around her lifelong studio on Union Square, to Harlem. She had been close personal friends with Raphael and Moses Soyer, often painting together in each other’s studios while garnering enthusiastic support to develop her primitive style, rather than follow their conventional process. She carried close working associations with a handful of other artists of the time, but mostly kept to herself and her passion.

Berman's self-taught range was much wider than the etchings and lithographs that on first glance define her. In some cases it includes detailed watercolors and drawings depicting Harlem’s African American culture, while different selections of large oil on canvas work depict her Chagall-esque early folkloric memories of illusory and spiritual Jewish life in Ukraine. Other paintings evoke a similar perspective on social realism cityscapes. There are more portraits, still life, and other paintings based upon her strong and long-standing ethereal connection with the artist Henri Rousseau, with whom she dreamt of having a direct association and who influenced her fantastical life paintings throughout her career.

While she did exhibit her wide range of paintings on countless occasions throughout the first half of the 20th century, by the time she died in 1957 she remained on the fringes of the modern art world that developed away from her. Sarah’s works remained untouched in her Union Square studio for over 20 years, exactly as they had been at the time of her death, while her husband Leivi struggled to keep them safe. Between 1978 and 1984, her oeuvre of some 300 oil paintings and thousands of drawings and prints were packed up, moved and entombed behind a series of fake walls in the attic of her niece’s house on Long Island. Despite her well received primitive style and lengthy list of works in notable collections across America, as trends shifted away from her Naive aesthetic, Sarah was left un-classed and brushed aside. From 1960 onward Berman's career would stay dormant, where it remained mostly hidden until her body of work was re-discovered behind those fake walls within the family's house in 2012.

Sarah Berman has been described as an “Outsider’s Outsider”, a self-taught artist whose work crosses between a transformative Naïve Social Realist and Folk artist traditions.

== Career ==
=== Sweatshop years (1912–1918) ===
==== Artistic development ====
Sarah Berman settled into the tenements of NYC's Lower East Side, working as a seamstress in the harsh environment of garment sweatshops from 1912-1918. By the age of 16 and during these years, Berman overcame the severe conditions and trauma from her tragic early years and began pursuing her determined interest in creating artwork.

Inspired by the various textile designs, styles and methods she would work with in the sweatshops and at the earliest stage of her career, Sarah developed a distinctive artistic style, aiming to create a vision of the life she lived. At this time, she was living in impoverished conditions. She was affected by the same conditions she painted in her earliest Naive social scenes.

Sarah Berman had little money for art supplies, she collected whatever materials she could find and the majority of her earliest works through this period were completed on brittle and vulnerable paper, or cardboard. These works evoke deep visual ties to the hallmarks of self taught naïveté, bordering on Art Brut and acutely falling into what would later be considered as "Outsider Art", long after her death.

The characteristics of naïve art have an awkward relationship to the formal qualities of painting, especially not respecting the three rules of the perspective (such as defined by the Progressive Painters of the Renaissance):

1. Decrease of the size of objects proportionally with distance,
2. Muting of colors with distance,
3. Decrease of the precision of details with distance,

The results are:

1. Effects of perspective geometrically erroneous (awkward aspect of the works, children's drawings look, or medieval painting look, but the comparison stops there)
2. Strong use of pattern, unrefined color on all the plans of the composition, without enfeeblement in the background,
3. An equal accuracy brought to details, including those of the background which should be shaded off.

Sarah struggled to survive as a young single female immigrant who barely spoke English, while toiling daily as a seamstress in sweatshops. During this time and while she was becoming more comfortable with pencil and paper, she took one night class at the Modern School of the Ferrer Center in Harlem in 1915 with Robert Henri. This brief life drawing lesson was the only instruction that Sarah ever obtained. She received little formal technical instruction beyond this simplistic life drawing process, what resonated with her was the concept of "Memory Painting". This simple idea opened a world for her and led Berman to approach her work with this method.

==== Political influences ====
Aside from pursuing her autodidactic development in artwork, Sarah Berman became a keen follower of Clara Lemlich Shavelson, "the young firebrand whose impassioned Yiddish speech set off the 1909 Uprising of the 20,000, the largest strike by women workers in the United States to that time. It galvanized the fledgling International Ladies Garment Workers Union and set off a wave of women’s strikes between 1909 and 1915 that spread from New York to Philadelphia, Cleveland, Chicago, Iowa, and Kalamazoo, Michigan." "But it also set the stage for tragedy when union negotiators failed to advance the young women’s demand for safer working conditions. That lapse would come back to haunt the union on March 25, 1911, when the Triangle Shirtwaist Fire in New York City killed 146 workers, mostly immigrant Jewish and Italian women."

Sarah Berman had just moved from Philadelphia to New York and was influenced by the Lemlich's leadership. Between 1911 and 1916, Sarah would frequently engage with many of her female peers within the sweatshops she worked in. They would develop their attention for activism in all things social justice, pursuing the ideals of socialism and setting the stage for the next phase of what was to come in Berman's life.

=== The Tea Room years (1918–1920) ===
==== Political development ====
As the decade was coming to an end, Sarah's creative pursuits took a backseat as the political landscape around her began to shift dynamically. In 1918 Sarah moved beyond her sweatshop career and embarked on starting a new business as the founder and operator of the “Tea Room” in the building which housed Manhattan’s Rand School, with its connections to the Socialist Party of America. Although she did not produce much artwork during this short period of running the cafe, she was highly active in the rising socialist movement surrounding her.

In the summer of 1919, the Rand School became embroiled in a series of violent civilian mob incidents and further police raids by the Bureau of Investigation. Just weeks after J. Edgar Hoover became the head of the newly minted General Intelligence Division, Berman came face to face with officers from his "Radical Division" as they raided her Tea-Room along with the school in one of the incidents. She watched as many of her cohorts were violently beaten, some taken away into custody. All business records and monies were taken along with some of Berman's personal documents. Berman became a potential suspect by proxy and she was watched for her perceived connection to the ongoing investigations surrounding the Socialist Movement and the Radicals.

These events had a profound effect on Sarah, adding to the cumulative trauma she endured from the political, religious and idealistic persecution in her early life in Ukraine. She witnessed a number of her close friends and associates get scooped up in the raids and ultimately face severe prosecution within the Lusk Committee investigations. Some were even deported. From this point on, Sarah shied away from public acknowledgement with the socialist party, preferring to dither into the further fringes of tenement society. She would carry this trauma throughout her life, it ultimately being a root cause for her to remain otherwise reclusive during the heights of her art career.

==== Artistic influence ====
Sarah's artwork would be forever influenced by the effect the Palmer Raids had on her. Berman’s Tea Room had become a hot spot for socialist activity as the political landscape escalated through 1919 and where she had met so many of her beloved friends and chosen family. She later painted the people and events from memory as a fantasy backdrop into many of her wondrously depicted interior social scenes. Despite her anxiety surrounding this history Berman would go on to depict those same events she witnessed in the violent mobs, raids and ensuing investigations, particularly in her highly detailed ink drawings of court scenes from later stages of her career.

=== Lower East Side tenement years (1921–1934) ===
==== Idealistic inspiration ====
The Bermans were involved in other political ideas of their time. One of the strongest movements affecting Jews in the late nineteenth century was that of modern Zionism. By the 1920's there was a strong resurgence of this movement, especially among the Jewish immigrants who were socialists, as were Sarah and Leivi. The movement's "back to the land" sentiment influenced Leivi and Sarah to put their idealistic zeal to work.

In 1923 the Bermans bought an abandoned farm in Albany, New York for $800.00. They couldn't have chosen a worse time to become farmers. High taxes, high foreign tariffs and a world depression were beginning to cripple the farming community making it impossible to sell American staple crops. After two years living in a state of poverty while trying to make a living "off the land" they were forced to give up, and returned to New York city.

==== Artistic development ====
Berman had not stopped painting and drawing during these farm years. Sarah began to utilize watercolors, her works became instantly vibrant and more refined yet still evoke many of the hallmarks of a naïve, primitive perspective. She began to explore with oil based paintings too, although her access to proper supplies was limited. The majority of these oil works from the beginning of this period are on wood, board or in some cases whatever she could find and reuse. Sarah would harness this early experimentation with oils and in the mid 1920's began to develop artwork with the aesthetic and style she would come to be recognized for.

As the decade progressed to the mid-1920's, Sarah Berman became entirely focused on her art. From this point forward and with the help of her husband Leivi, who was her singular support system in their harsh world, she began to move toward a more matured approach. She harnessed her own process of "Memory Painting", and began capturing the people and places she would encounter on her frequent journeys throughout the lower east side and Harlem neighbourhoods. From 1925 - 1927 Sarah started the first prolific period of her career, producing numerous works on canvas as she began to show signs of a maturing artist, albeit with her primitive style and approach. In one of these works Berman produced, called "Second Avenue Wedding", she depicts a skewed perspective yet emits an aura of warmth and endearment of the figures depicted in the scene. While it is among her earliest oil on canvas pieces, is also considered among her best.

Despite being classed as a poor, marginalized, self taught “primitive” artist, she thrived alongside a backdrop of highly trained and educated cohorts, who were beginning to find their way to perceived success within the conventional art world. On an almost a daily basis, Berman ventured out on the streets of the Lower East Side and the downtown areas of Manhattan to observe and study people in their various activities. When Leivi accompanied her she would visit neighborhoods where she could find gypsies, workman's bars, cafeterias, burlesque houses, "peep-shows" and shooting galleries. Being a somewhat shy person and while developing her earlier training, she would never sketch in public, but studied her subjects and later recalled her observations once she was in her studio. She recorded all aspects of working-class life, including her own.

Though aware of the philosophies of the Ashcan School, she never considered herself a disciple. Her paintings never took on a sophisticated look, and never glorified the people of working-class neighborhoods. She never painted in a style that was calculated. She painted for herself hoping that people would find her work pleasing and expressive on its own terms. In 1927 Berman sent some of the oil paintings she produced during her farm period to a show in New York City at Grand Central Palace, sponsored by the Society of Independents.

Although it is true that Berman’s aesthetic was self taught, she gained a critical following in these earlier years. Berman’s first significant exhibitions were at J.B. Neumann’s New Art Circle in 1928. She would go on to have other showcases there including a 1932 solo exhibition. It’s these early works of Sarah’s that predate and jumpstart her autodidactic process of her printmaking career, prior to the WPA.

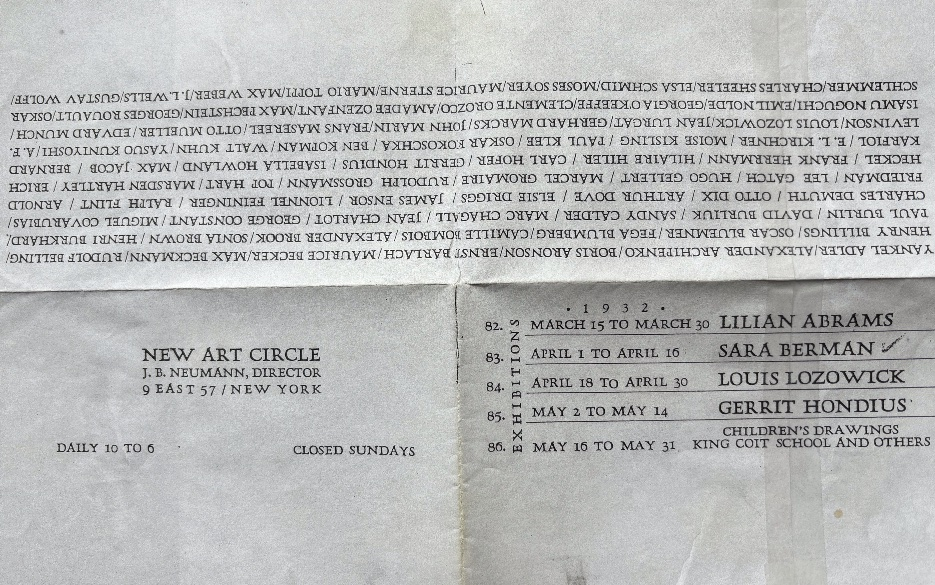
April 1st – April 15th, 1932: Sarah Berman's first solo exhibition held at J. B. Neumann's New Art Circle

=== WPA years (1935–1941) ===
She was a self-taught printmaker before joining The New Deal’s WPA Graphic Arts Division. There she began producing a prolific range of etchings and lithographs, which are among her best known. They circulated widely, with many notable examples finding their way into the permanent collections of museums across the United States, including Metropolitan Museum of Art, Smithsonian American Art Museum, Philadelphia Museum of Art, SFMOMA and Baltimore Museum of Art.

It was during these years that Berman also experimented with early and primitive color serigraphic techniques, which she applied in her well received entry that was included in the 1940 MoMA show American Color Prints Under $10. The show was organized as a vehicle for bringing affordable fine art prints to the general public.

=== Mid-career years (1942–1947) ===
After becoming one of the earliest female contributing members of the National Serigraph Society, her color silkscreen works travelled with exhibitions across America, including Dallas Museum of Arts in 1944, several MoMA exhibitions, and the Serigraph Society’s own Gallery on 57th St. alongside Anthony Velonis, Ruth Gikow, Harry Gottlieb and Robert Gwathmey. Sarah exhibited at several other regional galleries during this time, especially in the 1940’s.

By the middle 1940’s Berman's style underwent a major change as evidenced by the manner in which she painted the oil on canvas “Dawn”. She no longer depicted life on the streets of her neighbourhood with truth to location or to the working-class people. Her work took on an increasingly mystical and emotional tone and subject matter as she slowly disengaged herself from the outside world. She started to paint scenes from her imagination that gave her great joy and comfort. The subjects of her paintings were poets and rabbis, mothers and babies, fantasied plant-life and docile animals in Eden-like surroundings.

=== Late years (1948–1957) ===
In one of Berman’s late representations called "Joe Gould & Friends”, we can see the style that Berman adapted for the rest of her life. The setting is indistinct, an envelope of atmosphere rather than a location. Bands of ephemeral pastel colors curve around the figures in a fluid manner indicating emotional rather than physical content. Shown as a frail old man with a sheaf of papers clutched to his chest, Gould is flanked by seemingly caring and thoughtful people. The figures themselves are spectral beings, their linearity emphasizing their insubstantial nature. Instead of drawing from life Berman is taking the scene from what she called the “inner eye," where she could invent or imagine a moment rather than merely record it.

Berman’s last exhibition while she was alive was a one-person show in May of 1953 at The Artist’s Gallery in New York City. In it, she presented twenty-one oil paintings combining her street scene portrayals with her more mature, mystical efforts. This painting embodies her spiritual innocence and was a notable work in what would be her last exhibition in public view during her lifetime.

=== Influences ===
Sarah Berman produced a legacy of artwork that constitute a visual diary of urban, immigrant, Jewish, and tenement life in New York City during the early 20th century. Berman portrayed a very different side of New York cultural life than many other female modernists of the period. Sarah was a progressive woman and a socialist, supporting the ideas of racial equality and integration and often painted racially mixed crowds and multicultural gatherings, African American families and children of Harlem. Her paintings conveyed a combination of the difficult struggles of immigrant life in N.Y.C.

Berman's use of the “memory painting” process is what often draws the comparisons to the Ashcan School, in which artists were taught to observe their scenes in real life while taking detailed account of what they saw to later express their vision within the given medium they chose. Upon closer look Sarah's artwork and style seems to fit much closer to the realm of naive or folk art rather than traditional social scenes. Her work speaks to the primitive, innocent perspective and fantasy environments similar to other “Outsider Artists” within the Naive category, who also worked from a memory painting process such as Grandma Moses.

=== Style ===
Berman painted primitive and fantastical scenes inspired by her experiences on New York’s Lower East Side with “a directness that is distinctive,” remarked one reviewer. The art critic Henry McBride praised her “untrammelled imagination”, something the art historian Alfred Werner attributed to her own cultural marginality as part of a Jewish community that, during the 1920s and 1930s, “formed a curiously disadvantaged enclave” as “awkward outsiders in New York’s largely Gentile Art Establishment.” The artist worked in other mediums including etching, and lithography. Some of these works can be found in the permanent collections of The Metropolitan Museum of Art and Smithsonian American Art Museum. In 1944, a critic for the New York Times, Howard Devree referenced her painting as being “one of the most interesting painters the Artists’ Gallery has yet shown.

== Artwork in museum collections ==
=== Metropolitan Museum of Art (4) ===
1. Circus Clowns c. 1935
2. Daniel and the Lions Den c. 1935
3. The Return c. 1935
4. Manniken c. 1935

=== Smithsonian American Art Museum (2) ===
1. Fish Market c. 1939
2. Waitresses c. 1935

=== National Gallery of Art (1) ===
1. Afternoon Tea c. 1939

=== Philadelphia Museum of Art (7) ===
1. Old Print Shop c. 1938–1939
2. Meat Store c. 1938
3. The Return c. 1935
4. Lunch Hour c. 1938
5. Clown c. 1936
6. The Misers c. 1938
7. Circus Clown c. 1939

=== San Francisco Museum of Modern Art (1) ===
1. Fish Peddler c. 1930

=== Baltimore Museum of Art (1) ===
1. Fish Peddler c. 1935–1939

=== Krannert Art Museum (7) ===
1. Lunch Hour 1 c. 1937
2. Lunch Hour 2 c. 1937
3. Afternoon Tea c. 1937
4. Crowned c. 1939
5. The Return c. 1935–1943
6. The Misers c. 1935–1942
7. Street Scene c. 1935–1942

=== Walker Art Center (1) ===
1. Clowns c. 1937

=== Spencer Museum of Art (1) ===
1. The Return c. 1935

=== North Carolina Museum of Art (1) ===
1. Flowers c. 1935–1942

=== Mead Art Museum (1) ===
1. Untitled (Rainy Street Scene) c. 1940

=== New York Historical Society (1) ===
1. Harlem Street Scene c. 1941

== Exhibitions ==
- 1927 - Society of Independents | Grand Central Palace
- 1928 - J.B. Neumann’s New Art Circle | 35 West 57th St, New York, NY
  - 29th Exhibition - Group Exhibition
    - April 24th - May 23rd
- 1932 - J.B. Neumann’s New Art Circle | 35 West 57th St, New York, NY
  - Exhibition 83 - Sarah Berman's First Career Solo Exhibition
    - April 1st - 16th
- 1932 - The Indoor Art Martket | 134 East 74th St, New York, NY
  - Group Exhibition Sponsored by Mr. & Mrs. Lucien Tyng
    - Nov 19th - 26th
- 1939 - Federal Art Gallery | 225 West 57th St, New York, NY
  - 99 Graphic Prints
    - January 24th - February 7th
- 1940 - MoMA | 11 W 53rd St, New York, NY 10019
  - PM Competition: Artist as a Reporter
    - April 15th - May 7th
- 1940 - MoMA | 11 W 53rd St, New York, NY 10019
  - American Color Prints Under $10
    - Nov 26th - Dec 28th
- 1941 - The Artists' Gallery | New York City
  - Solo Exhibition
    - March - April
- 1941 - MoMA | 11 West 53rd St, New York, NY 10019
  - Silk Screen Prints Under $10
- 1942 - The Artists' Gallery | New York City
  - Group Exhibition
    - April
- 1943 - The Norlyst Gallery | 59 West 56th St. New York City
  - Group Exhibition
    - April
- 1944 - The Artists' Gallery | New York City
  - Group Exhibition
    - March
- 1944 - The Artists' Gallery | New York City
  - Solo Exhibition - "Fourteenth Street"
    - April - May
- 1944 - Dallas Museum of Arts
  - "National Serigraph Exhibition," October 29–December 1, 1944
- 1944 - National Serigraph Gallery | 38 West 57th St, New York
- 1953 - The Artists' Gallery | New York City
  - Group Exhibition
    - January
- 1953 - The Artists' Gallery | New York City
  - Solo Exhibition - 21 Paintings
    - May
- 1960 - The Graham Gallery | New York City
  - Solo Retrospective Memorial Exhibition
    - April
- 2007 - Spencer Museum of Art | Kansas
  - Teaching Gallery: Depression Era: Prints & Photos from 1929-1941
    - Oct 30th - Nov 29th
- 2014 - Mead Art Museum |
  - New Arrivals: Modern and Contemporary Additions to the Collections
    - Feb 14th - June 29th 2014

== Critical reviews ==
In 1941 Elizabeth Sacartoff, former art editor of Time Magazine, stated for The New York Times:

“It is not everyday that an art exhibition starts all the strings humming inside of you. But Sarah Berman’s show… does just that. Fluent, quick, expressive lines transform common place domesticity into something rare and glorious… she paints these people with a reverence and a love that is almost holy…it is a wonderful feeling. She never had an art lesson. She found her sanctuary in her Union Square studio, far from fellow artists. Her art grew into a religion… SO deep set, she forgets she rarely sells a picture.”

The New York Times art critic, Howard Devree, also wrote in 1941:

“Sarah Berman… is one of the most interesting painters the Artist’s Gallery has yet shown… Her larger oils are in striking contrast with her realistic little water-colors of humble interiors with figures”.

Devree also commented favorably in 1943:

“Classed as a ‘primitive’… she has nevertheless achieved such a degree of sophistication of color and composition… that she may be deemed to have graduated from the implications of the narrower meaning of ‘primitive’.”

In 1943 a critic for Art News compared:

"Sarah Berman at The Artist’s Gallery presents her individualistic paintings. She has her own sense of design, and it is a fresh one; her approach is simple, direct, and slightly subdued. Her Still Life with Magazine is excellent and, perhaps, exhibits her distant kinship to Matisse. She is at her best in these subjects… “

Bennett Schiff, art critic, wrote for the New York Post in 1958:

“… She belongs to the select small number of artists of history whose life and arts are indissoluble...whose entire lives, past and present are part of their art. What she did was to connect living things with a creative vision which was at times primitive… but always simple and honest and direct to the bone. She is as important in her way to our stream of art Rousseau is to his, as Redon is and as Chagall is.”

John Canaday, critic for The New York Times wrote after her 1960 memorial retrospective exhibition:

“Berman… was one of those rarities, a life-long spiritual innocent. She must be called a primitive for lack of a better term in English. The French "Maitres Populaires de la Realite,” doesn’t quite work in translation as “Popular Masters of Reality,” but it is better than “primitive” to describe these self taught painters who never mastered, and would have been less expressive painters if they had mastered conventional techniques of representation.”

New York Times art critic Dore Ashton also said in 1960:

“Sarah Berman was a quiet painter, born in 1895 in Ukraine and reared in America, where she died in 1957. Her work, on view at The Graham Gallery, 1014 Madison Avenue at 78th Street, ranged from delicate fantasy to realistic impressions of New York’s Lower East Side. She gave her deep attention to flowers, children, lovers, bakers, poets and birds, and painted them with an artlessness, a directness that is distinctive…. This memorial show of paintings from 1927 to 1955 shows a clear vision that Alfred Werner, a critic, compares to those of other so-called primitive painters such as John Kane, Joseph Pickett, Vivin, Bombois and Bauchant.”

In 1976 Alfred Werner writes about Berman as “The Forgotten Artist” in The Jewish News:

“Mrs. Berman, one of America’s great naïve painters, who had at least as much talent as the widely known Grandma Moses…”

== Joe Gould's Secret ==
In true “Outsider” fashion and despite having fulfilled the real life role of “Guardian Angel” in Joe Gould’s life, Sarah Berman’s name and likeness were unfortunately deleted from the film “Joe Gould’s Secret”, an American drama film directed by Stanley Tucci and written by Howard A. Rodman. The movie, based on the magazine article "Professor Sea Gull" and the book "Joe Gould's Secret" by Joseph Mitchell, instead substituted the more well known artist Alice Neel for Berman, due to the later’s primitive un-classed career falling outside of the conventional art world grasp at the time. This unjustly left Berman even further alienated as an outsider artist who continued to be grossly overlooked. The character of Neel, who falsely received acclaim for her role in the Joe Gould story, was portrayed by Susan Sarandon.

Joe Gould wandered the streets of Greenwich Village during 1920s through the1940s, impoverished and homeless. He frequented the Village clubs where he was accepted by the intellectuals and artists and given money. He always carried pages from what he called his magnum opus, the "Oral History of our Times." " Joe Gould described his work as a full compendium of interviews and commentary about the hundreds of people he'd met who lived in the seamier sides of New York society. Berman met him in the 1930s at a party where he told her about this project which consumed his life, and which he was trying to complete. She befriended and helped him.

After losing contact with him she didn’t see him again until, in the 1940s, she found him collapsed in a tenement doorway, inebriated and deathly ill. She took him home, nursed him, gave him food, clothing and money, and became his advocate. She wrote many letters on his behalf, having one immortalized in the subsequent book “Joe Gould’s Secret” by Joseph Mitchell for The New Yorker magazine in 1964.

Sarah Berman is cited in a 2014 Vanity Fair magazine article on the well-known film and is described in this article as a painter and supportive friend of Gould's, more specifically a sympathetic saviour to Joe Gould.

"...Gould remained a man of the street. He was often dirty, dizzy, and drunk, cold, loused, and hungry. He had no teeth and cadged his meals, eating free ketchup by the spoonful in diners. And when, in the spring of 1944, a painter Gould knew, Sarah Ostrowsky Berman, happened upon him seated on the steps of a tenement on Bleecker Street, with a bad cold and a hangover and sores on his legs, she was heartbroken. Only a few years earlier, the two had had long talks at parties."
