= Timeline of West Calder history =

This article is intended to show a timeline of the history of West Calder, Scotland, up to the present day.

== B.C. ==
Crosswood Cup and Rings

Kipsyke Barrow

== 1-999 ==
79: Romans arrive in the area and build Castle Greg

c.800: Harburnhead Long Cist burials

== 1000-1099 ==
1160: Malcolm IV grants the manor of Calder to Randulph de Clere

== 1600-1699 ==
1643: The large parish of Calder Comitis is divided into two districts, named Mid Calder and West Calder. West Calder Kirk erected

1645, 26 October: Presbytery of Linlithgow make their formal visitation to the parish

== 1700-1799 ==
1792, 15 March: Petition from the parishioners of West Calder denouncing the slave trade in the West Indies sent to Parliament

1795: United Presbyterian Church inaugurated in a converted dwelling house

== 1800-1899 ==
1807: About 12 stone coffins (long cists) were found approximately 330 yds south of Cromwell's Stone, near Harburn

1821: Population of the parish was 1500

1822: Construction of Cobbinshaw Reservoir

1830: Roman coins were found by labourers digging a ditch near Crosswood Burn

1831: Population of the parish was 1617

1841: Population of the parish was 1666

1844: Free Church inaugurated

1847: A further three stone coffins (long cists) were found by Mr J Cochrane

1851: Population of the parish was 2120; the number of houses in the area being 379.

1860: 19 August; John Kane, the artist who painted primitivist scenes of Pittsburgh and memories of Scotland, is born.

1868: The Waterhouse opened by 'Miss Young of Limefield'

1870: The White star Cricket Club was formed

1871: Gas introduced to the village. The gas works was situated in Young Street, obtaining gas, from Young's company

1871: A barbed and tanged flint arrowhead from West Mains was donated to the National Museum of Antiquities of Scotland

1872: Three-fourths of an acre purchased from Mr James Young by Fr John Prendergast of Bathgate for the building of a RC Church

1874: Addiewell Chemical Cricket Club established

1874: Father A. Goldie becomes the 1st Parish Priest of Our Lady and St. Bridget's R.C. Church

1875: Co-operative Society formed by a group of local miners

1877, 13 December: Inauguration of Our Lady & St Bridget RC Church

1878 : 6th Linlithgowshire Rifle Volunteers, formed at West Calder as one company and a subdivision 17 April

1879, 27 November: First visit of Gladstone

1880, 2 April: Second visit of Gladstone

1882: Addiewell Shamrock Football Club formed

1885: An imperfect whinstone axe-hammer from West Calder was donated to the National Museum of Antiquities of Scotland by A Lumsden

1885, 22 May: William C. Learmonth convenes a meeting in the Masons’ Lodge to gather information for his future history

1885: West Calder and Addiewell Golf Club was formed on ground at Burngrange Farm

1885: Publication of ‘History of West Calder, by a Native’ by Learmonth. Printed at the reporters office by Aikin

1890: Father A. Goldie becomes the 2nd Parish Priest of Our Lady and St. Bridget's R.C. Church

1891: The baptismal font in the West Kirk was given by William Cochrane Learmonth in memory of his parents, the Rev. William Learmonth and Mrs Helen Learmonth

1892: A jet ring, 2 inches in diameter, from West Calder was donated to the National Museum of Antiquities of Scotland by A Purdie

== 1900-1999 ==
1904, 20 November: West Calder ‘Free’ Library built and open, under the auspices of Librarian, Mr Thomas Blackwood

1912: Canon J. Murphy becomes the 3rd Parish Priest of Our Lady and St. Bridget's R.C. Church

1913: Fr Henry J. Kenny becomes the 1st St Thomas the Apostle R.C. Church

1918: Fr T. McDonna becomes the 4th Parish Priest of Our Lady and St. Bridget's R.C. Church

1921: General Sir Francis Davies officiates at the unveiling of the West Calder War memorial

1923: Mgr C. F. Chase becomes the 5th Parish Priest of Our Lady and St. Bridget's R.C. Church

1923: Harburn Hall erected as the Reading and Recreation Room after being bought second-hand from the British Army

1925, 18 July: The Hardale Golf Club was officially opened

1928: Fr Ewen Connolly becomes the 2nd St Thomas the Apostle R.C. Church

1928: Construction of Burngrange Cottages

1930: Fr J. L. Stuart becomes the 6th Parish Priest of Our Lady and St. Bridget's R.C. Church

1932: 14 December: Harbuen Golf Club officially opened

1932, 14 December: Official opening of Harburn Golf Club

1932: Originally men only, Harburn Hall now had Women on the committees

1934: Fr M. V. Bruce becomes the 8th Parish Priest of Our Lady and St. Bridget's R.C. Church

1934, 10 Aug.: Death of John Kane

1937: Fr Michael Kelly becomes the 3rd St Thomas the Apostle R.C. Church

1944: Fr W. Quigley becomes the 9th Parish Priest of Our Lady and St. Bridget's R.C. Church

1947, 10 January: 15 men killed at the Burngrange Pit disaster

1947: Fr Edward Mohan becomes the 4th St Thomas the Apostle R.C. Church

1947: Fr J. K. Birnie becomes the 10th Parish Priest of Our Lady and St. Bridget's R.C. Church

1954: A two-pronged flint scraper found near Castle Greg by Mr Alec Ritchie

1954: A barbed and tanged arrowhead of chert found near Limefield Housewas donated to the National Museum of Antiquities of Scotland by Alec Ritchie

1965: A stone axe from a bing at West Calder, and probably from The Bads Colliery, Harburn, was donated to the National Museum of Antiquities of Scotland by H McKerl

1965: Fr James McMahon becomes the 5th St Thomas the Apostle R.C. Church

1970: A barbed and tanged arrowhead from near West Calder was donated to the National Museum of Antiquities of Scotland by R Cleland

1971: An early Bronze Age flat axe found at Cobbinshaw

1973: Canon D. P. Boyle becomes the 11th Parish Priest of Our Lady and St. Bridget's R.C. Church

1980: Elvis Costello and the Attractions play the Regal, 22 March.

1980: Fr A. Shiels becomes the 12th Parish Priest of Our Lady and St. Bridget's R.

1980: Madness play the Regal, 3 May.
