= Joseph Gould =

Joseph or Joe Gould may refer to:

- Joe Gould (writer) (1889–1957), writer, eccentric, homeless man
  - Joe Gould's Secret, the 1965 book by Joseph Mitchell based on the writer
    - Joe Gould's Secret (film), the 2000 film based on the above book
- Joe Gould (boxing) (1896–1950), manager of boxer James J. Braddock
- Joe Gould (rower) (1909–?), Australian Olympic rower
- Joseph Gould (politician, born 1808) (1808–1886), farmer, businessman and political figure in Ontario, Canada
- Joseph Gould (Canadian cultural figure) (1833-1913), a Montreal resident active especially in the music scene and cultural journalism of the city
- Joseph Gould (politician, born 1911) (1911–1965), 20th century Ontario Liberal Party Member of Provincial Parliament
