= Lee Gatch =

American artist

- Born: Harry Lee Gatch; September 10, 1902; Baltimore, Maryland
- Died: November 10, 1968 (aged 66); Trenton, New Jersey
- Known for: Painter

Harry Lee Gatch (September 10, 1902 – November 10, 1968) was a twentieth-century American artist known for his lyrical abstractions and his ability to find "a fresh approach" to painting the figure and nature "through interwoven patterns of flattened figures" and a Fauvist-inspired sense of landscape.

== Biography ==
Harry Lee Gatch was born on September 10, 1902, in a rural community near Baltimore, Maryland. His family had no sympathy with his artistic aspirations, which was a source of pain throughout his life, but he was determined to make a name for himself as an artist.

Gatch graduated from the Maryland Institute College of Art in the early 1920s; there a visiting instructor, New York painter John Sloan, made a strong impression on him and confirmed him in his sense of his vocation. In 1924, in search of more advanced instruction and more exposure to modern art, he went to Europe and studied with the painter Andre Lhote. While in Paris, he was a particularly avid student of the French modernism of André Derain, Édouard Vuillard, and Pierre Bonnard, inspirations which are evident in his own refined color sense.

According to the online biography of Gatch at the Phillips Collection website, Gatch exhibited in the Venice Biennials of 1950 and 1956, and he was inducted into the American Academy of Arts and Letters in 1957. Although he is best known for his nature-inspired abstract works, he also worked for a time as a muralist for the Federal Art Project, painting murals., Tobacco Industry in 1940 in Mullins, South Carolina, and Squaw's Rest, 1942. in Elizabethtown, Pennsylvania. He was married in 1936 to Precisionist artist Elsie Driggs. They had one child, Merriman Gatch.

According to MarylandArtSource.com, "His abstract painting style combined elements of Post-Impressionism, Cubism, and Symbolism in mystical evocations of nature." The Phillips Collection article asserts that "Gatch strove throughout his career to maintain an individual style based on the American representational tradition while reaching beyond appearances to find meaning through design and color."

Despite the admiration of discerning men like collector Duncan Phillips and the art dealer J.B. Neumann, Gatch had a difficult time creating a stable career and attracting the critical and public attention he felt he deserved. His marriage to Driggs, who gave up her own career until Gatch's death in 1968, was source of essential support to him during his darker periods, and the couple lived a financially straitened life in rural Lambertville, New Jersey. In the heyday of Abstract Expressionism, Pop Art, and the other radical postwar movements, he was a little-known presence in American art. To his friend and one-time mentor, Max Kahn, he wrote in 1964, "It will always remain impossible for me to believe anyone will look me up after the bell tolls. It is perhaps best for me to do my task faithfully." In the view of one art critic, "Gatch [ultimately] found his own voice and equalled the best of Milton Avery, an artist with whom he has a kinship."

After his death, Gatch was interred at Woodlawn Cemetery in the Bronx, New York.

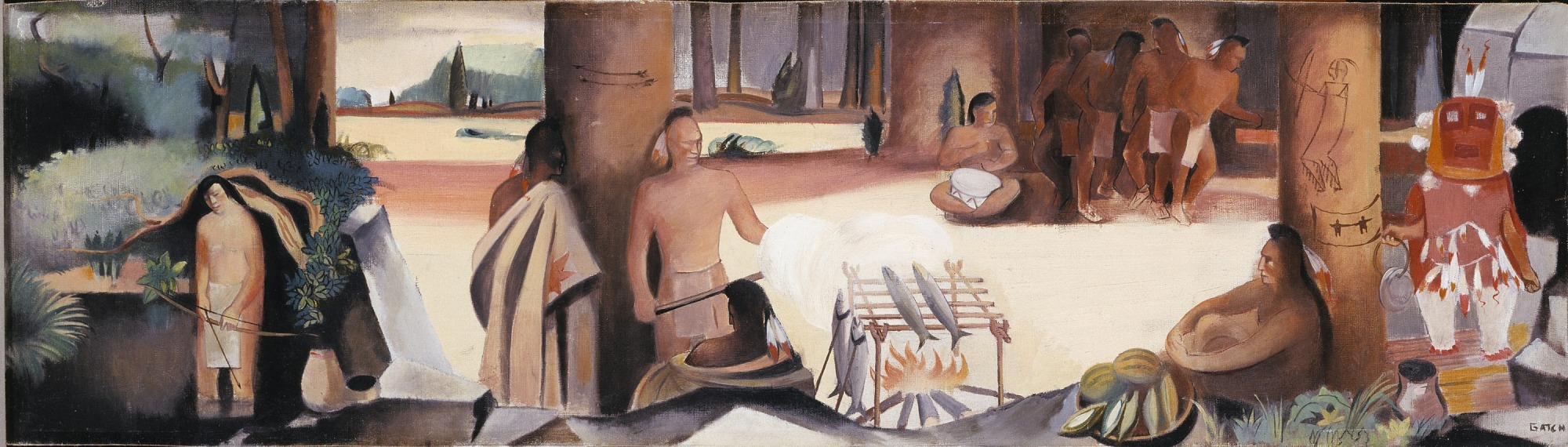
mural study, Elizabethtown, Pennsylvania Post Office, 1941

== Collections ==
Gatch's work is in the collection of:

- the Guggenheim Museum,
- the Whitney Museum of American Art,
- the Metropolitan Museum of Art
- the Phillips Collection,
- the Smithsonian American Art Museum,
- the National Gallery of Art,
- the Albright-Knox Art Gallery,
- the Baltimore Museum of Art and
- the Pennsylvania Academy of the Fine Arts.

== Sources ==
- Breeskin, Adelyn. Lee Gatch. Washington, D.C.: National Collection of Fine Arts, 1971.
- Lee Gatch: Recent Paintings. Berne: Stampfli & Cie, 1963. Lee Gatch, Recent Paintings (Berne : Stämpfli & Cie., 1963) OCLC 1977645
- Lee Gatch: Recent Paintings, 1954-1958. New York: World House Galleries, 1958. Lee Gatch : Recent Paintings, 1954-1958 (New York : World House Galleries, 1958) OCLC 45616694
- Loughery, John. "The Lyrical Abstractions of Lee Gatch." Arts Magazine (April 1988), pp. 78–80.
- Newark Museum. Lee Gatch, 1902-1968 (Washington, Published for the National Collection of Fine Arts by the Smithsonian Institution Press, 1971) OCLC 226692
- Rathbone, Perry Townsend. Lee Gatch. Washington, D.C.: American Federation of Arts, 1960. Lee Gatch (New York, 1960) OCLC 1213277
- Washington University in St. Louis. Kemper Museum of Contemporary Art. St. Louis, Mo.
