= Lawrence Ennis =

Scottish engineer (1871–1938)

Lawrence Ennis CMG, OBE
- Born: August 31, 1871; West Calder, Scotland
- Died: May 5, 1938 (aged 66)
- Occupations: Engineer; industrial manager
- Known for: Managing director of Dorman Long; supervision of the construction of the Sydney Harbour Bridge

Lawrence Ennis CMG OBE (31 August 1871 – 5 May 1938) was a Scottish engineer.

He was best known as the managing director of Dorman Long and the main supervisor of the construction of the Sydney Harbour Bridge.

== Life ==
Ennis was born in West Calder, Scotland. He was descended from a family of engineers on his maternal line. His father was a builder from County Meath in Ireland. He was educated at Gavieside School, but due to his family's poor circumstances he left at the age of 12. His first job was to work as a drawer in a local shale pit. He emigrated with his family to Rochester in the United States at the age of 15. He attended a technical college in Rochester and was apprenticed to an engineering firm.

Ennis developed his reputation when he patented a new angle iron whilst employed at the Carnegie steel works in Pittsburgh. Ennis managed one of the American Bridge Company's largest sites by 1900. Ennis joined Dorman Long in 1903 as superintendent in charge of bridge and constructional works. In 1905 he was made works manager. Ennis became general manager of the company in 1915 and a company director in 1924.

Ennis was appointed OBE in 1918, in recognition of his conversion of the Dorman Long works into a munitions manufacturing site during World War One.

From 1924 to 1932 Ennis was resident in Australia to manage the construction of Sydney Harbour Bridge.

Upon his return to Britain in 1932, Ennis was appointed managing director of Dorman Long. Under his tenure the firm built a large steelworks at Warrenby, Redcar.

He died in 1938.

== Publication ==
- Brearley, Joan McDonald; Ennis, Lawrence (1982), The bridge opened : official opening, 19th March, 1932, Pylon Press, ISBN 978-0-9593592-0-6
- As joint author – in Minutes of Proceedings of the Institution of Civil Engineers, Vol. 238 – Session 1933-1934, Pt. 2. London: 1935. 2) Sydney Harbour Bridge: Manufacture of the Structural Steelwork and Erection of the Bridge, by R. Freeman and L. Ennis;
