= Castle Greg =

Remains of a Roman fortlet in Scotland

- West Lothian, Scotland, UK
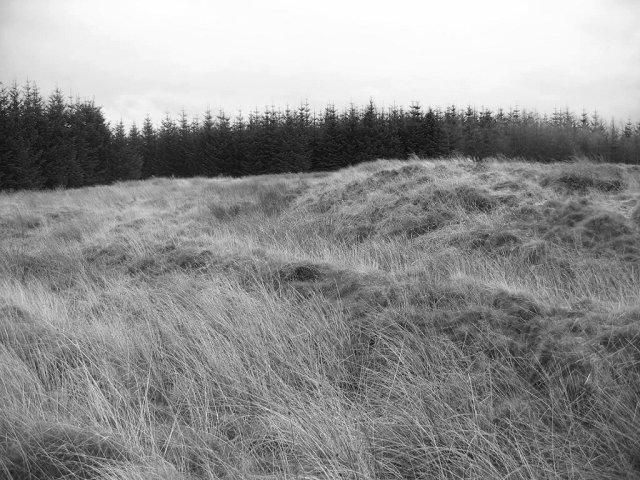
- Site of Castle Greg Roman fortlet

Location
- Location in Scotland West Lothian
- Coordinates: 55.817227°N 3.517112°W
- Grid reference: NT0559

Castle Greg is the archaeological remains of a Roman fortlet in Harburn on the Camilty Plantation, approximately three miles south-east of West Calder, West Lothian, in Scotland.

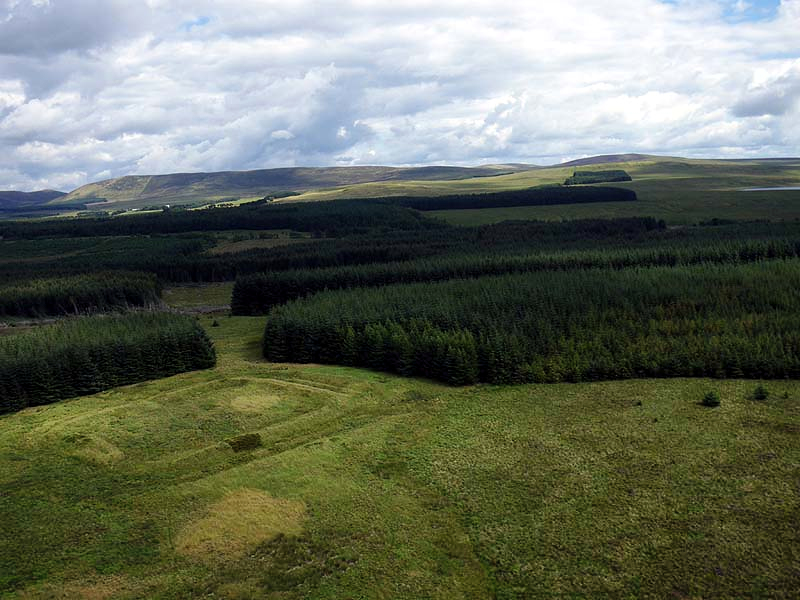
An aerial view of Castle Greg Roman fortlet.

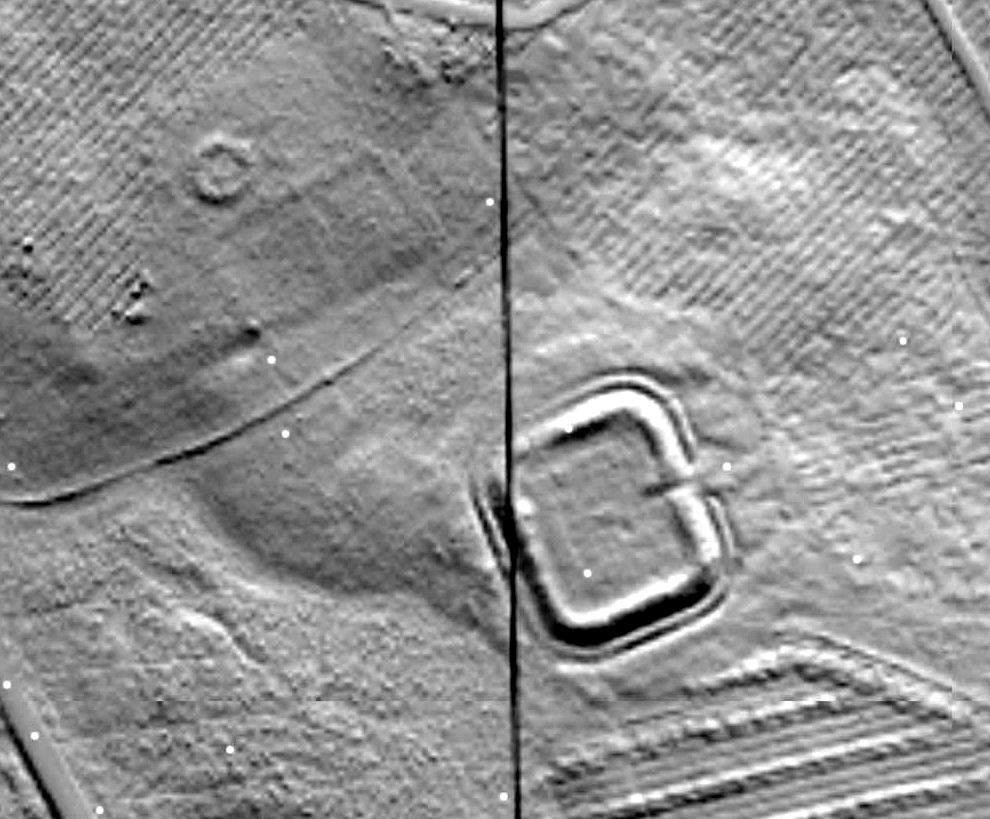
A lidar view of Castle Greg Roman fortlet.

The site is less than an acre in size, and lies just off the B7008. It is one of the best preserved Roman earthworks in the country and was first excavated in the 19th century by Sir Daniel Wilson, the interior excavation having taken place in 1852.

The remains take the form of two defensive ditches protecting a clearly visible rectangular rampart. Originally, these ditches would have been at least fifteen feet in depth. The rampart behind the ditches still stands up to five feet high in places, though obviously, this would have been far higher when the fortlet was in use. On the rampart stood a wooden palisade, at least ten feet high, with a walkway running the length of the fortlet. There is an entrance through the rampart at the eastern end, over which would have stood a wooden tower attached to the walkway.

Very little remains of the flat interior of the fortlet, although it is known that within there would have been two rows of barracks, between which there was a well. There would also have been a stable block. During the 1852 excavation of the interior, pottery was discovered from the well between the two barracks.

Castle Greg was a most likely used as a monitoring base for an east–west road running along the foot of the nearby Pentlands, from the Forth to the Clyde Valley. Although the fortlet currently commands no long-distance views, during the 1st century AD, when the fort was in use, the surrounding countryside was not forested, and Castle Greg would have been able to view clearly up to the Fife coastline and the mountains beyond.

The name Castle Greg is possibly derived from the Roman name Camulosessa Præsidium, from nearby Camilty, itself derived from Camulos Tref – literally, village of Camulos.
