= West Calder =

Village in West Lothian, Scotland

Coordinates: 55.85199°N 3.56854°W

West Calder: Scottish Gaelic: Caladar an Iar; Scots: Wast Cauder
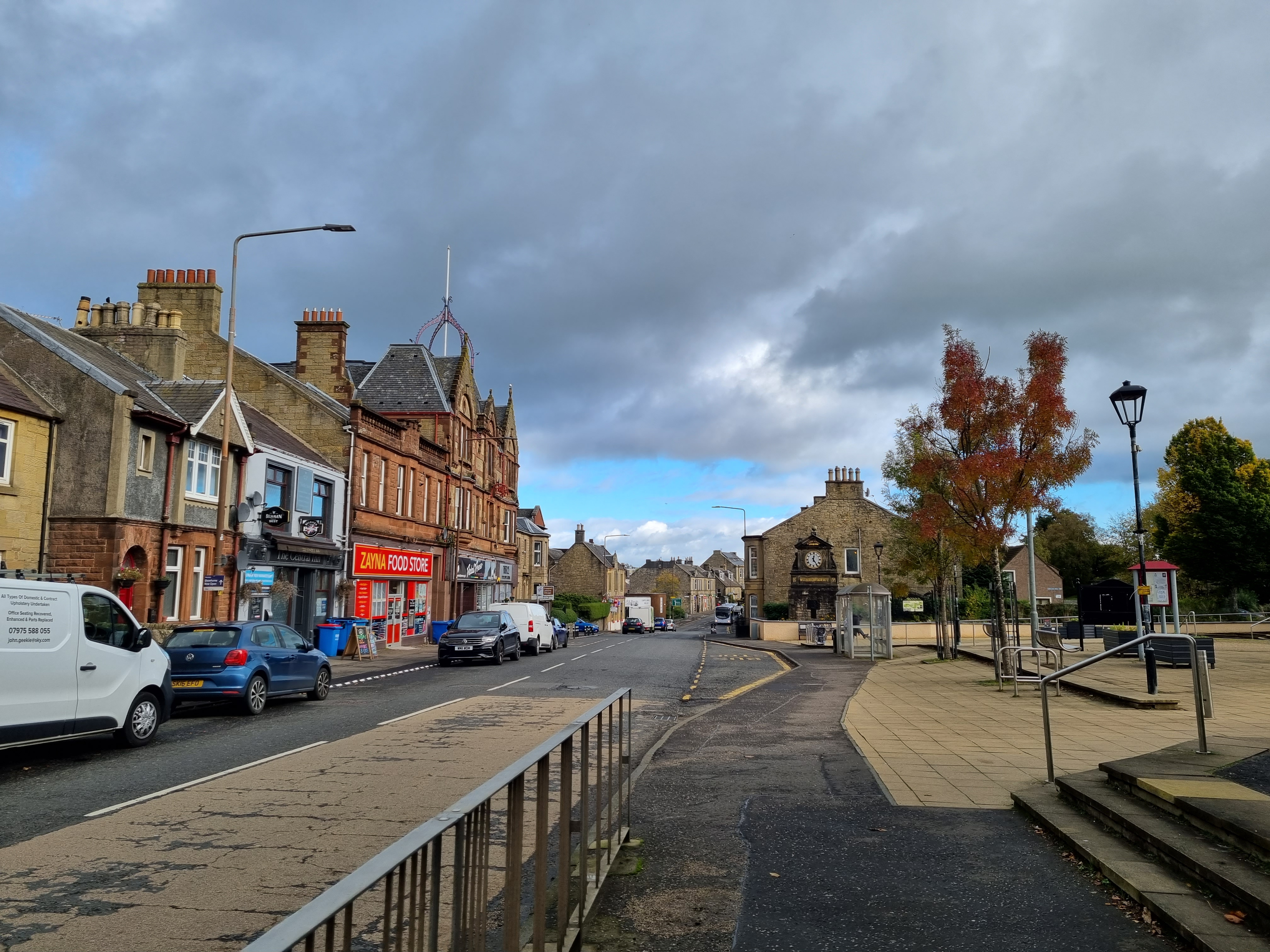
- West Calder Main Street looking towards Union Square

- Location within West Lothian
- Population: 3,250 (2020)
- OS grid reference: NT019632
- Council area: West Lothian
- Lieutenancy area: West Lothian
- Country: Scotland
- Sovereign state: United Kingdom
- Post town: WEST CALDER
- Postcode district: EH55
- Dialling code: 01506
- Police: Scotland
- Fire: Scottish
- Ambulance: Scottish
- UK Parliament: Livingston
- Scottish Parliament: Almond Valley

West Calder (Scots: Wast Cauder, Scottish Gaelic: Caladar an Iar) is a village in the council area of West Lothian, Scotland, located four miles west of Livingston. Historically it is within the County of Midlothian. The village was an important centre in the oil shale industry in the 19th and 20th centuries. West Calder has its own railway station.

The surrounding villages that take West Calder's name in their address - Polbeth, Addiewell, Loganlea, Harburn and Westwood - outline the area that this village encompasses, and they all have played an important part in the history of the village as well as West Lothian. The village is a 10-minute drive from Livingston, which is host to two large shopping centres. The village lies along the ridge above the Calder burn.

== History ==
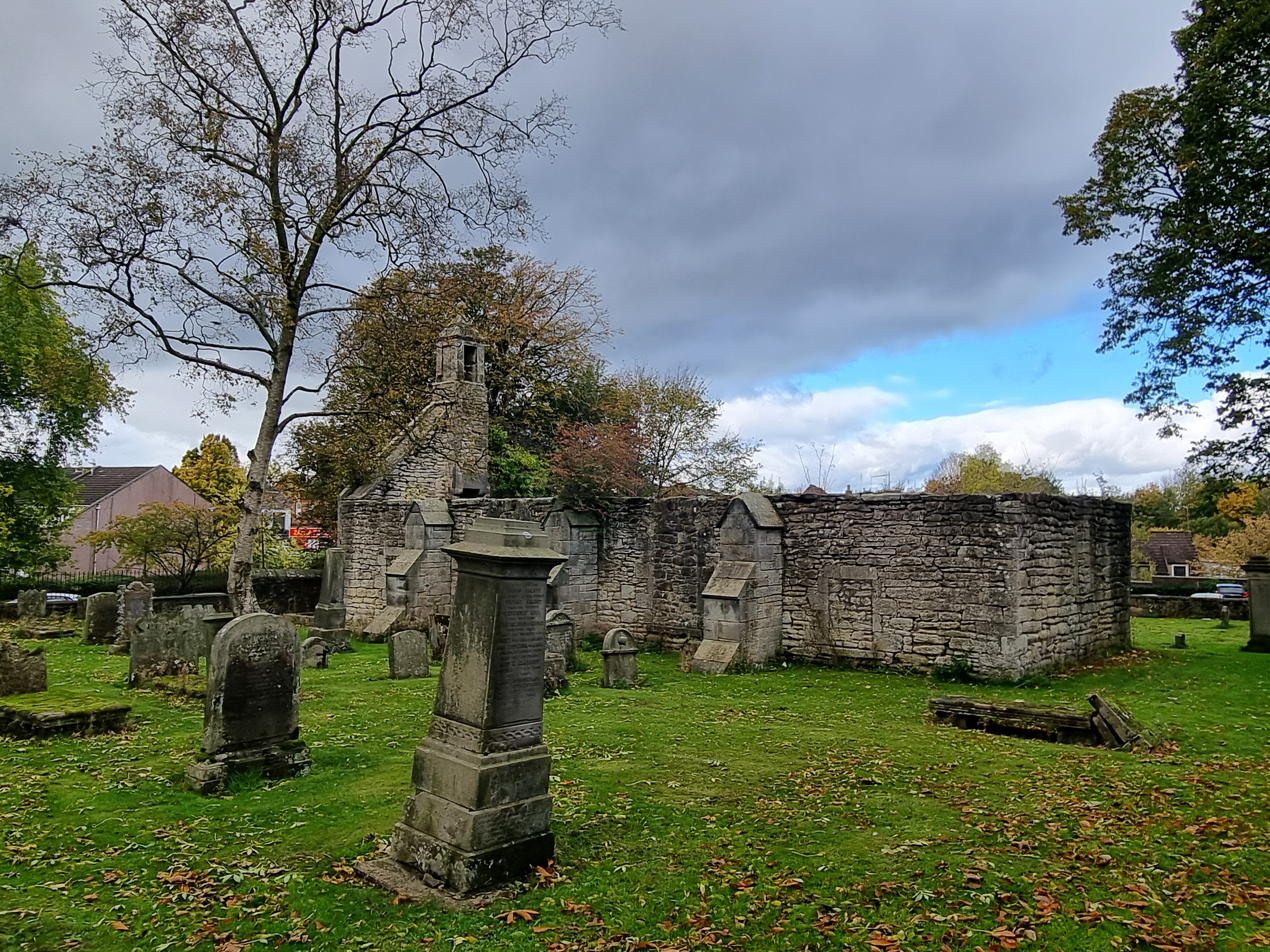
The original West Calder Church, dates to 1643 but is now a ruin.

Early evidence of settlement in the area of West Calder is indicated by the presence of Castle Greg, a Roman fortlet to the south-east of the village in neighboring Harburn. In the medieval period, the area was part of Calder Comitis, a large parish under ownership by the Earls of Fife. By 1643, the large parish of Calder Comitis was divided into two districts, named Mid Calder and West Calder. The old Parish Church off Kirkgate street dates to 1643 when the area was created a distinct parish. The rectangular building, with a square belfry was abandoned in the 1880s following construction of the West Kirk of Calder and is now a roofless ruin. The original church burial ground is intact and the entire site is a scheduled ancient monument. By 1755, the population of the parish was recorded as 1294 persons. The population had risen to 1435 persons by 1810 and continued to grow throughout the 19th century.

In 1792, the residents of West Calder submitted a Petition against the Slave Trade to the House of Lords. In 1797, Hermand House on the western edge of the village was built for George Fergusson, Lord Hermand, a Scottish Judge. The main building, coach-house and stables are Category B listed. West Calder became an important centre of the oil shale industry during the Victorian era. The closest Shale Mine to the village was Burngrange mine owned by Young's Paraffin Light & Mineral Oil Co., Ltd, which at the time was a subsidiary of Scottish Oils Ltd and was one of the group of 12 nearby shale production facilities working the oil shales in the Counties of Midlothian and West Lothian. Other nearby shale mines and works included Westwood Oil Works, Addiewell Oil Works, Hermand Oil Works and East Hermand oil works.

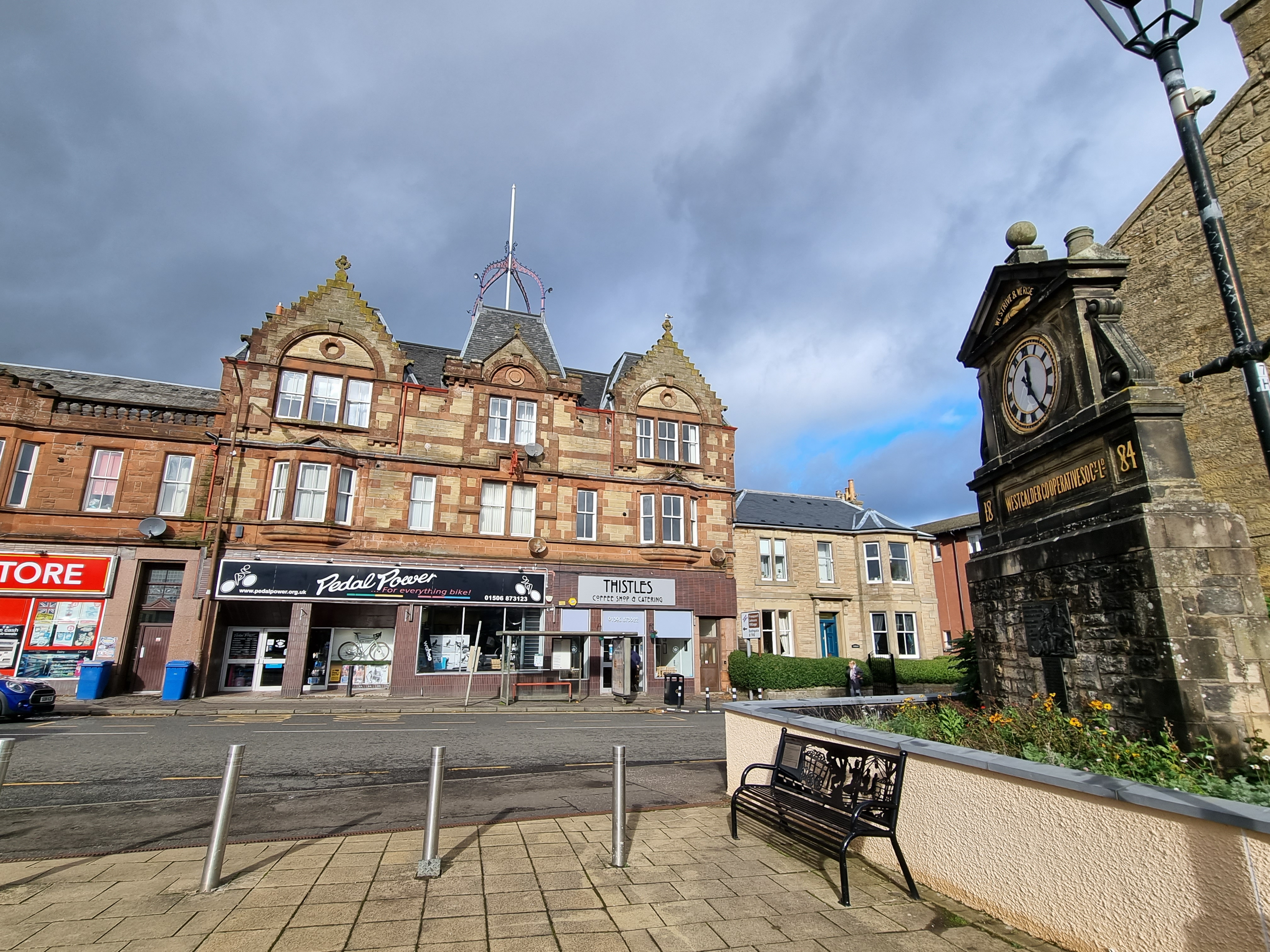
The Cooperative Building and Burngrange disaster Memorial Clock.

The village has a long association with several Cooperative organisations, now defunct. There were several early cooperative associations in the village, known as friendly societies, which were founded in 1799 and 1812, however they eventually ceased operation. The principal West Calder Co-operative Society (WCCS) was founded in 1875 by a group of shale miners. The former WCCS Co-operative building of the town at 13 to 19 Main Street was built in 1913 to a design by William Baillie. It is Category B listed, stone fronted with an unusual ironwork crown and two crowstepped gables. Two previous cooperative buildings existed in the town; the Peoples Palace and clocktower was replaced by the Royal Bank in 1885 to a design by J G Fairley and another building demolished to make way for Union Square. The former co-operative bakery building on Society Place was built in 1910. The bakery in Society Place closed in 1982 when WCCS merged with Bathgate Cooperative Society.

In the late 19th century, West Calder was one of the first villages in Scotland to have electric street lighting with electricity supplied by the local Co-operative Society, which had its own generating station. In 1879, William Ewart Gladstone visited the village and made a key speech on foreign policy and free trade.

The West Calder Drill hall was a local drill hall built before the First World War and in 1914 was the base for "G" Company, 10th Battalion, Royal Scots. The West Calder War Memorial was unveiled in 1921 by General Sir Francis Davies. It sits opposite the library in a small garden and consists of a square base, with memorial plaques, crowned by a stone obelisk. By the early 20th century, the Shale industry production around the village entered a period of decline.

The Regal cinema was a local cinema that was built in 1938 and served the community, before closing in the 1980s. Most housing in the village dates from the mid-20th century onwards. The population of West Calder and Polbeth was 5,337 in 2020.

=== Burngrange mining disaster ===
Burngrange, an area west of the village, was the site of the Burngrange mining disaster in January 1947. At the northeast corner of Union Square in the village, there is a pedimented memorial clock in memory of the 15 men who died in the Burngrange disaster.

== Economy ==
West Calder has a High Street with a selection of pubs, shops, and services. The Railway Inn is a Category C listed public house on the Main Street, with an octagonal corner exterior and preserved late 19th century interior, built circa 1895. On the southern edge of the village, is the most northerly rehoming centre of the Dogs Trust, closely followed by the new centre at Glasgow. The area around West Calder is mostly agricultural but in the 21st century, has seen several Wind farm developments. In March 2021, permission was given for construction of one of the largest subsidy-free onshore wind projects in the UK, at Longhill farm just outside the village and due for completion in late 2022.

Freeport village was a shopping and retail centre to the north of West Calder that was built in 1996 and closed in the early 2000s.

== Culture ==
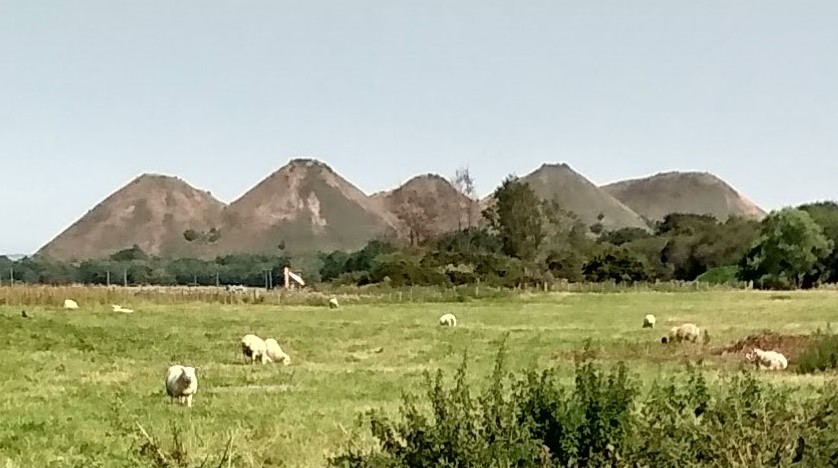
Five Sisters

The 'Five Sisters' group of shale bings to the north of West Calder is a local landmark and scheduled monument. The bings rise to a height of 230 feet (70 m) above the surrounding area, and are the spoil tips from the oil shale industry that was a feature of the area. The Five Sisters were named by artist John Latham during his time with an Artist Placement Group project with the Scottish Office's Development Agency in 1975–6.

A description of West Calder written by Rev. Mr. Muckersie appears in the Old Statistical Account of Scotland (1791–1799), Volume 18 No.9 pp. 190–198. The description includes information on the topics such as the character and manners of the people, agriculture and produce, the ecclesiastical state of the parish, diseases affecting the local populace and details of the poor funds.

West Calder has a Masonic Hall which is home to Lodge Thistle No. 270 of the Roll of the Grand Lodge of Scotland. The hall is also home to the West Calder chapter of the Order of the Eastern Star.

The Shale Trail is a 16 mile walking and cycling historical route between West Calder and Winchburgh, via Livingston and Broxburn using the Union Canal. The trail identifies areas of local history, primarily focusing on the extinct oil shale production industry.

== Education ==
West Calder High School provides secondary school education for the village and surrounding area. The school moved to a new award winning building in 2018 near the border with Polbeth. The new school cost £32 million and was opened by Gordon Brown, former Prime Minister of the United Kingdom. The previous school building was built in 1965 and was demolished in 2019.

The local primary school in the village is Parkhead Primary School.

== Community facilities ==
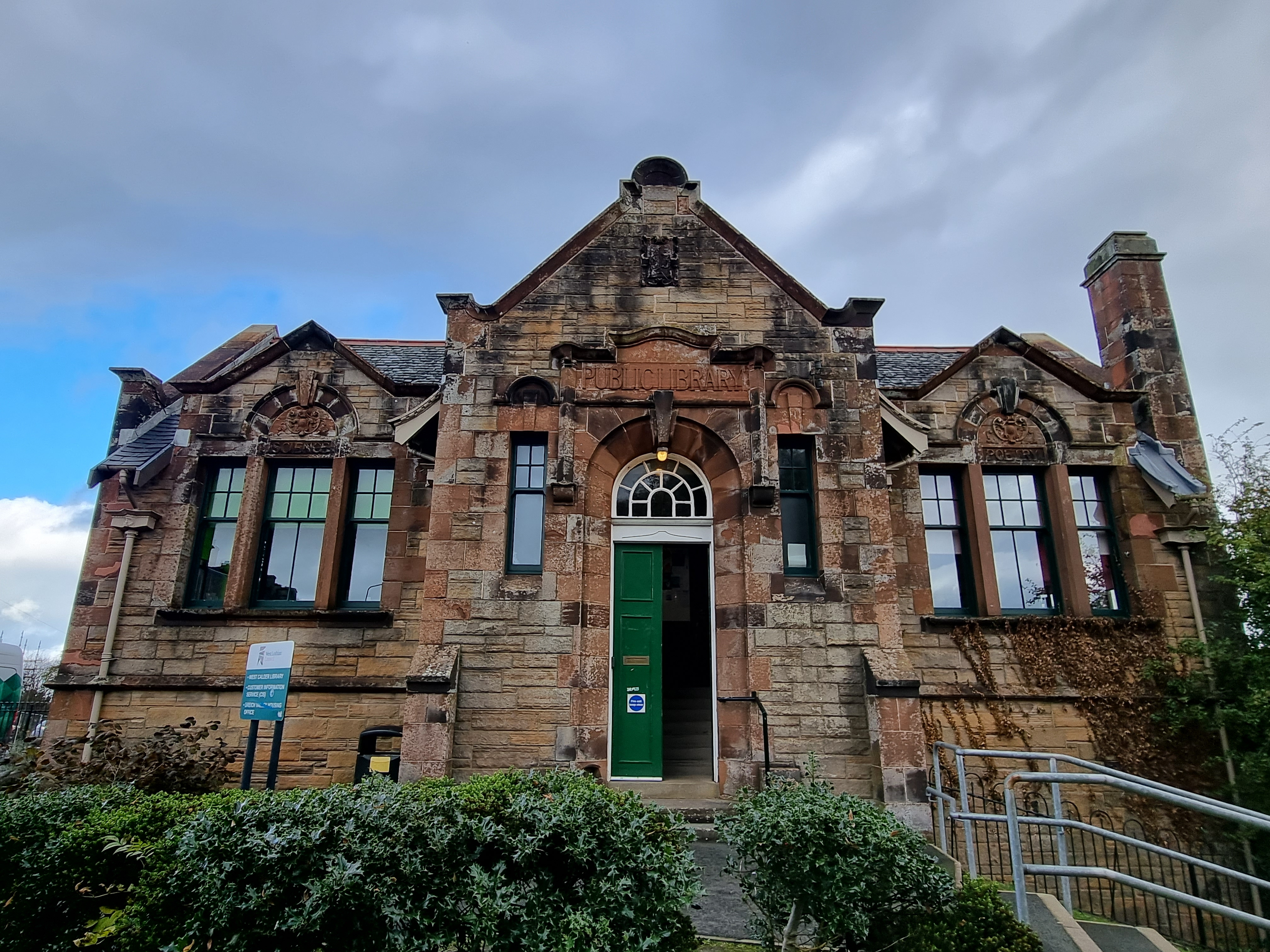
West Calder Library was built in 1903 with funds from Andrew Carnegie.

West Calder has a public library that is a Carnegie library and was built in 1903 to a design by William Baillie. Built of red and grey Ashlar stone, the building is a fine example of the Art Nouveau style, with detailing around the entrance and pedimented Venetian windows. Stone inscriptions include the words science and poetry. The building still includes original tiling and glass. The library is Category B listed. In 2016, the library was refurbished following a £500,000 renovation.

West Calder Medical Practice is a combined medical surgery and pharmacy at the West End of West Calder. The building cost several million pounds and was opened in September 2019. Healthcare in West Calder is administered under NHS Lothian and the nearest hospitals are St John's Hospital, Livingston and Tippethill House Hospital in Armadale.

Polbeth and West Calder Community Garden is a public garden and woodland.

There are three cemeteries in West Calder. The historic parish church cemetery is closed to burials and listed. The principal cemetery of the village is West Calder and Burngrange Cemetery on the western edge of the village. Hermand Cemetery is a new public cemetery open for burials on the eastern edge of the village.

== Transport ==
West Calder railway station connects the village with the mainline railway network. The station opened on 9 July 1869 as part of the Shotts Line linking Glasgow Central and Edinburgh Waverley via Shotts. The original station building is Category B listed and in 2018, the original cast iron footbridge was removed to Bo'ness and Kinneil Railway and replaced with a new structure.

The A71 road passes through the village to Breich in the west and to Polbeth in the east.

Lothian Buses operate service 74 serving West Calder with destinations such as Livingston, and Fauldhouse

== Religious sites ==
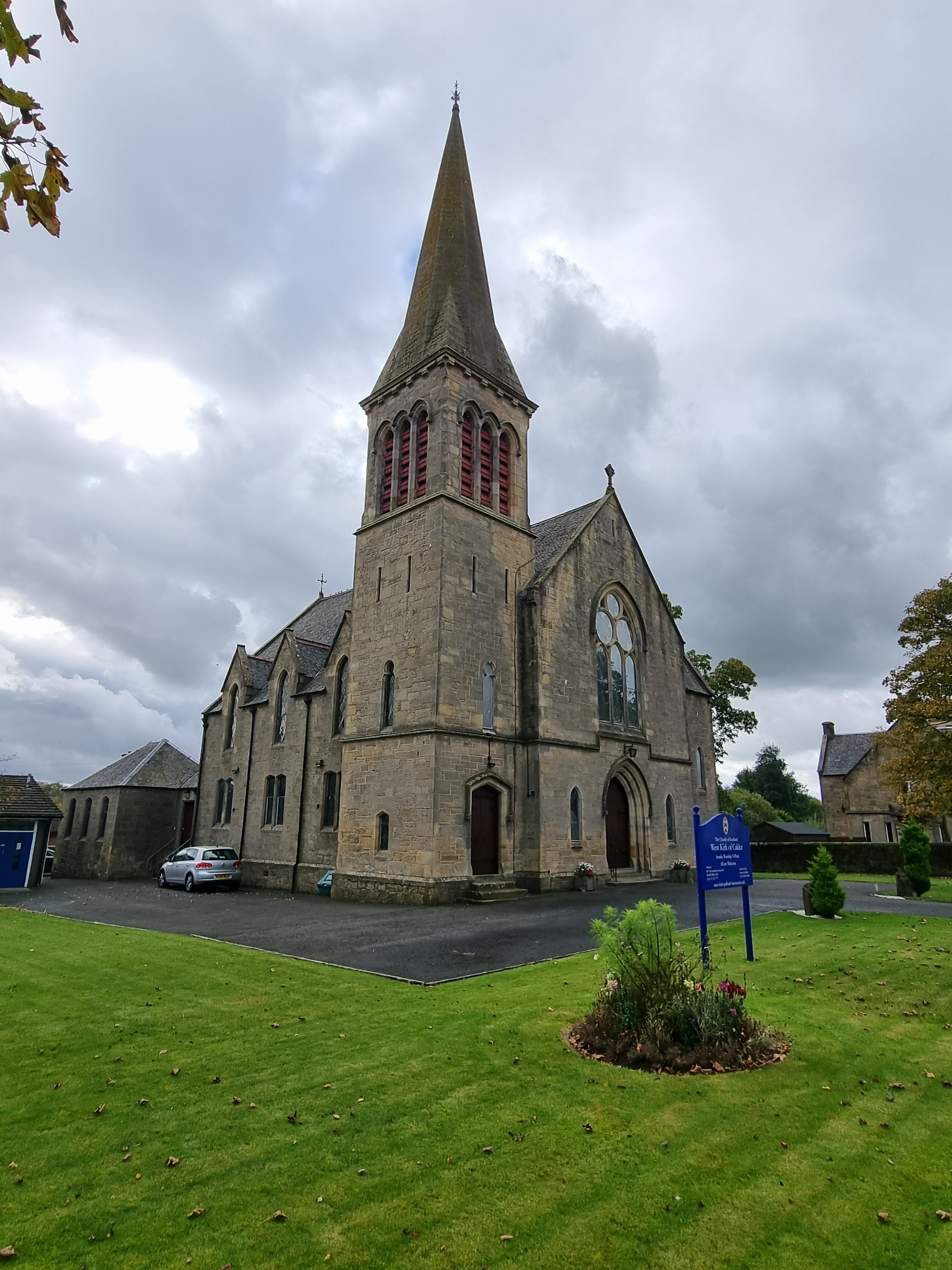
The West Kirk of Calder, built circa 1860.

West Calder has three churches: Our Lady and St. Bridget's Roman Catholic Church, West Kirk of Calder Church of Scotland and Limefield United Free Church.

The West Kirk was built circa 1860 and has a tall steeple with a broach spire.

== Sport ==
West Calder is home to the football club West Calder United, who compete in the East of Scotland Football League. The 19th-century team Mossend Swifts (which provided two Scottish international players) was also based nearby. There is also a youth club.

West Calder is also the home of the West Calder Model Flying Club. The club is run for the enjoyment and promotion of radio controlled model aircraft flying in the area. The club has its own tarmac runway and is maintained by the members for use throughout the whole year.

West Calder Bowling Club is a local bowls club in the village.

== Notable people ==
- Sir Archibald Douglas (1298–1333), Guardian of Scotland and military leader
- The birthplace of James Douglas (1675–1742), physician and anatomist
- James Graham Fairley (1846–1934) architect
- George Fergusson, Lord Hermand (1743–1823) law lord
- The birthplace of John Kane (1860–1934), painter celebrated for his skill in Naïve art
- George Hogg (1869 – ????), Scottish footballer
- Thomas Fairfoul (1881–1952), Scottish footballer
- Lawrence Ennis, main supervisor of the construction of the Sydney Harbour Bridge
- Robert McKeen (1884–1974), Speaker of the New Zealand House of Representatives
- Margaret Ross Hislop (1894–1972), Scottish oil painter
- Liz Mistry, author of the Detective Inspector Gus Maguire series was originally from the village
- Dougal Haston (1940–1977), mountaineer and pupil at West Calder High
- Brian Eddie (1952–), footballer
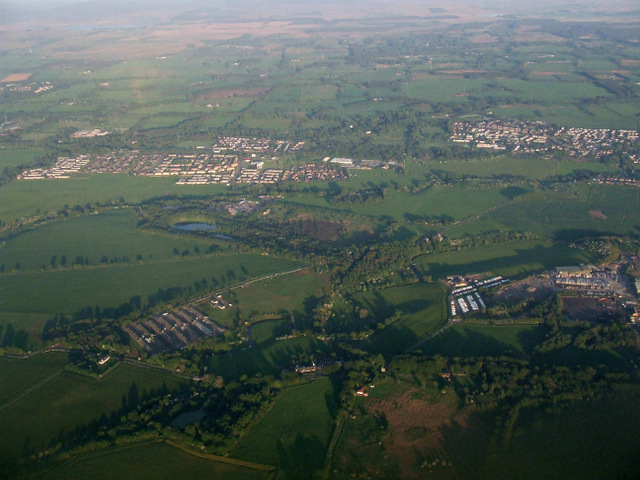
West Calder

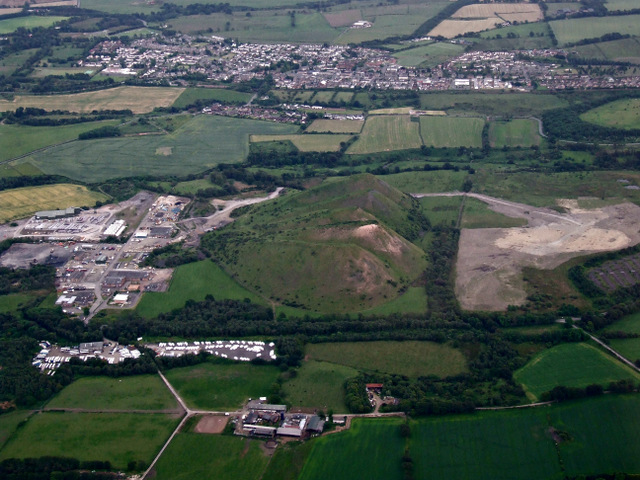
West Calder and Five Sisters

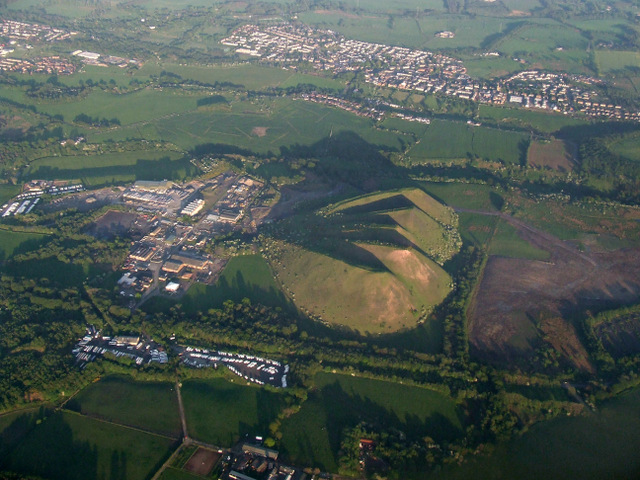
Five Sisters Bing

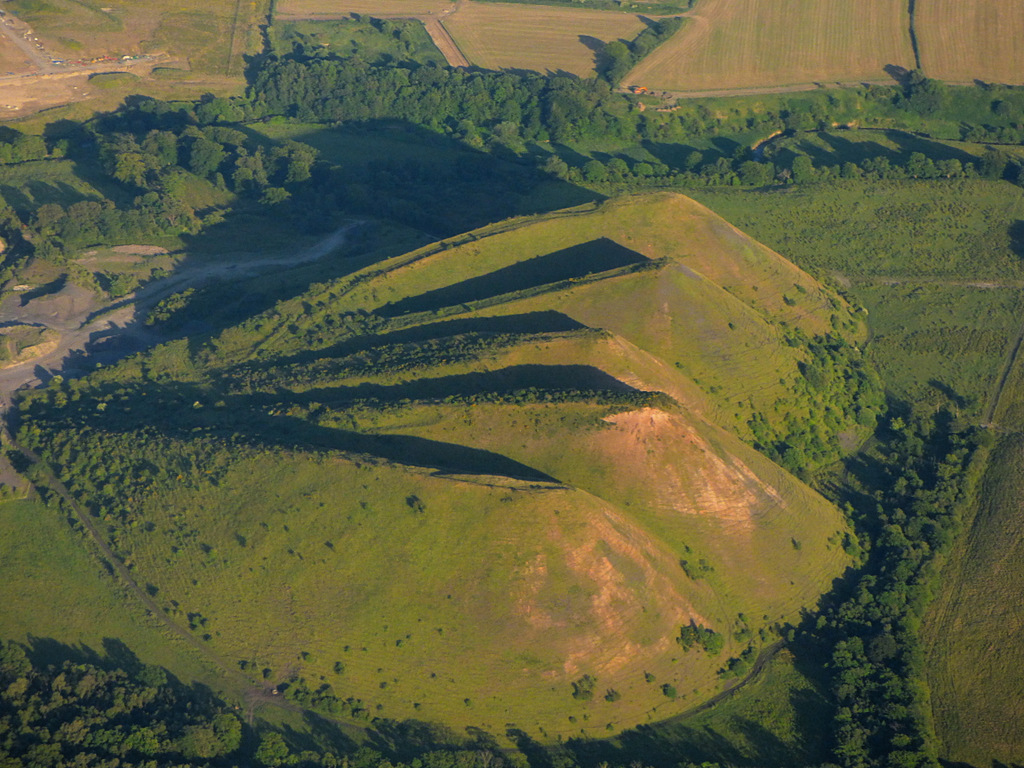
Five Sisters evening
