= Margaret Hislop =

Scottish painter (1894–1972)

Margaret Ross Hislop
- Born: Margaret Ross Grant; 1894; West Calder, West Lothian, Scotland
- Died: 1972 (aged 77–78); Edinburgh

Margaret Ross Hislop (née Grant, 1894–1972) was a Scottish painter, working primarily with oil paint.

== Personal life ==
Hislop was born in West Calder, Scotland.

In 1921 she married the artist Andrew Healey Hislop (1887–1954), who was one of her teachers. Together they travelled widely, including to Sri Lanka (then Ceylon), Egypt, Canada and India. In 1926 the couple had a daughter, Vivien whose probable portrait is held at the RSA. Vivien also became an artist, working mainly in watercolours.

The Hislops were listed as living at 18 Cluny Avenue, Edinburgh in 1949. They were friends and neighbours of another painter, Anne Redpath, when living in London Street in Edinburgh's New Town.

Margaret Hislop died in Edinburgh in 1972.

== Artwork and career ==
Hislop attended Westminster School of Art and later Edinburgh College of Art, where she was awarded her diploma in 1916. In 1950 She was elected as an associate of the Royal Scottish Academy and in 1964 became a full member.

Throughout her career, Hislop exhibited at the Royal Academy from 1948 with a portrait of her daughter, the Royal Scottish Academy, the Royal Glasgow Institute of the Fine Arts and the Scottish Society of Women Artists.

Hislop painted a portrait of Anne Redpath while they were both in Paris, entitled L'Aperitif. Her works appear regularly for auction.

== Artworks held in public collections ==
Title	Year	Medium	Gallery no.	Gallery	Location
Christmas Roses	-	oil on canvas	MINAG:1995.24	Lillie Art Gallery	Milngavie, Scotland
Flower Piece	1948 or before	oil on board	2779	Glasgow Museums	Glasgow, Scotland
Girl in Green	1965 or before	oil on board	CAC1965/13	City Art Centre	Edinburgh, Scotland
Jardin du Luxembourg	1955 or before	oil on panel	3034	Glasgow Museums	Glasgow, Scotland
Madonna of the Gondoliers	1963 or before	oil on canvas	1999.069	Royal Scottish Academy	Edinburgh, Scotland
Portrait of a Lady	1972 or before	oil on board	1997.165	Royal Scottish Academy	Edinburgh, Scotland
Portrait of a Young Girl	c.1951	oil on board	1997.163	Royal Scottish Academy	Edinburgh, Scotland
Summer Afternoon	1969 or before	oil on canvas	1977.887	McLean Museum and Art Gallery	Greenock, Scotland
The Willows	-	oil on board	1997.189	Royal Scottish Academy	Edinburgh, Scotland
