= Günther Franke =

German art dealer

Günther Franke (29 October 1900, Berlin – 5 October 1976, Munich) was a German gallery owner, art dealer, and art collector. He founded the Günther Galerie (later known as Galerie Günther Franke) in Munich.

== Life ==
Günther Franke, son of the director of Agricultural and commercial bank, began his career after the end of the war in 1918 as a volunteer with the gallery owner Israel Ber Neumann on Kurfürstendamm.

In the Graphisches Kabinett Franke first worked on an exhibition by Lyonel Feininger, where he met Max Beckmann in 1921. When Neumann emigrated to New York in 1923, Franke was transferred to the Neumann branch founded in Munich two years before.

=== With I.B. Neumann in Berlin and Munich ===
In the Graphisches Kabinett Franke first worked on an exhibition by Lyonel Feininger, where he met Max Beckmann in 1921. When Neumann emigrated to New York in 1923, Franke was transferred to the Neumann branch founded in Munich two years before.

In the same year the painter Otto Dix portrayed Franke together with the art historian Paul Ferdinand Schmidt and the gallery owner Karl Nierendorf and met Erich Heckel, Ernst Wilhelm Nay, Emil Nolde and Karl Schmidt-Rottluff. In 1930, I. B. Neumann and Günther Franke in Munich showed works by Georges Rouault as well as watercolors, hand drawings and lithographs by Alfred Kubin. The gallery presented Josef Scharl in 1931, the painters Joseph Mader and Max Wendl in a group exhibition in 1932, and the sculptor Fritz Müller, from 1932 to 1938 pictures by Edgar Ende.

=== Controversy during the Nazi years 1933-1945 ===
Franke's art dealing during the Third Reich has been a matter of controversy, resulting in lawsuits for restitution.

The Neumann and Franke Gallery in Munich changed its name to Galerie Günther Franke in 1937.

In January 1941 Franke visited Beckmann, who had fled to Amsterdam, and there he bought his paintings Circus Carriage and Homecoming. In the branch in Seeshaupt on Lake Starnberg, "'degenerate art" was hidden and sold."

=== Postwar ===
In the spring of 1946 Franke rented the former sculptor's studio of Franz von Stuck on Prinzregentenstrasse and opened with paintings by Franz Xaver Fuhr. Afterwards, works by Max Beckmann and Franz Marc were on view in the Villa Stuck. "The history of Galerie Franke is one of the most important and enjoyable chapters in the latest history of the art city of Munich. It fulfilled a task: there were certainly not a few who were only introduced to the most modern art through these exhibitions. "

A show in honor of the 80-year-old Emil Nolde was followed by a memorial exhibition for Oskar Schlemmer. In 1947 the "lively Günther Franke Gallery" presented Willi Baumeister as a representative of the "avant-garde of German contemporary painting."

In 1949 Franke loaned the Perseus triptych and a self-portrait by Max Beckmann, doubter and reader from Barlach, pen drawings by Kubin, paintings by Scharl and Schrimpf and watercolors by Ernst Wilhelm Nay for the exhibition Kunstschaffen in Deutschland in the gallery of the Central Collecting Point. In 1974 he donated 29 paintings and one Beckmann sculpture to the Free State of Bavaria. "This means that the Munich State Gallery now has the largest Beckmann collection in Europe."

Franke lived in Nibelungenstrasse. 28 in the Munich district of Neuhausen and was buried there at the Winthirfriedhof.

== Nazi-looted art ==
In 2016, the heirs to Alfred Flechtheim filed suit in United States for recovery of eight paintings that Günther Franke had donated to the Bavarian State Paintings Collections The lawsuit stated that "Franke was a soldier in the Wehrmacht and an eager follower of the Nazis when they were in power. He personally gained from the anti-Modern art measures taken by the Nazis. He amassed a fortune in those years from looted art and he was demonstrably involved in dealings with stolen art in the postwar era."

In 2011, the Bayerische Staatsgemäldesammlungen and the Städtische Galerie im Lenbachhaus, together with art historian Dr. Felix Billeter, launched a joint research project into the history of Gunther Franke. The four-year project was funded by the Ernst von Siemens Kunststiftung and was expected to conclude in 2015.

== Literature ==
- Kunsthändler, Sammler, Stifter : Günther Franke als Vermittler moderner Kunst in München 1923-1976. Felix Billeter, Andrea Bambi, Axel Drecoll, Christian Fuhrmeister, Meike Hopp, Gesa Jeuthe. Berlin. 2017. ISBN 978-3-11-048746-6. OCLC 1003132201.
- Mader - Müller - Wendl : Rekonstruktion einer Ausstellung bei Günther Franke 1932, Gemäldegalerie Dachau 2014 ; [zur Ausstellung "Mader - Müller - Wendl, Rekonstruktion einer Ausstellung bei Günther Franke 1932" in der Gemäldegalerie Dachau, 3. Oktober 2014 bis 22. Februar 2015]. Felix Billeter, Elisabeth Boser, Hans Mader, Josef Mader, Dachauer Gemäldegalerie, Zweckverband Dachauer Galerien und Museen. Dachau: Zweckverb. Dachauer Galerien und Museen. 2014. ISBN 978-3-930941-81-0. OCLC 896923493.
