= Howard Devree =

American editor and art critic

- Born: May 7, 1890
- Died: February 9, 1966; New York City, U.S.
- Occupation(s): Editor, art critic

Howard Devree (May 7, 1890 – February 9, 1966) was an American editor and art critic. He joined The New York Times in 1926, where he was an editor and, from 1947 to 1959, its art critic. He resided at 5 Gramercy Park.
