= West Calder Slave Trade Petition =

18th century British petition against slavery

The West Calder Slave Trade Petition was a 1792 petition, against the slave-trade, created in West Calder, West Lothian, Scotland.

== Abolition of the Slave Trade ==
The Parishioners of West Calder played a small part in the abolitionist movement of the late eighteenth century, as reported in the Edinburghshire Log of 1792. West Calder Parish posted a petition in advocating in the strongest terms that abolition of slavery was essential. Within 9 days of the publication of the document, 2 April 1792 William Wilberforce moved that the trade ought to be abolished; an amendment in favour of gradual abolition was carried, and it was finally resolved that the trade should cease on 1 January 1796. When a similar motion was brought forward to the House of Lords the consideration of it was postponed to the following year, in order to give time for the examination of witnesses by a committee of the House.
