= Burngrange mining disaster =

Scottish shale mine accident in 1947

Coordinates: 55.848°N 3.582°W

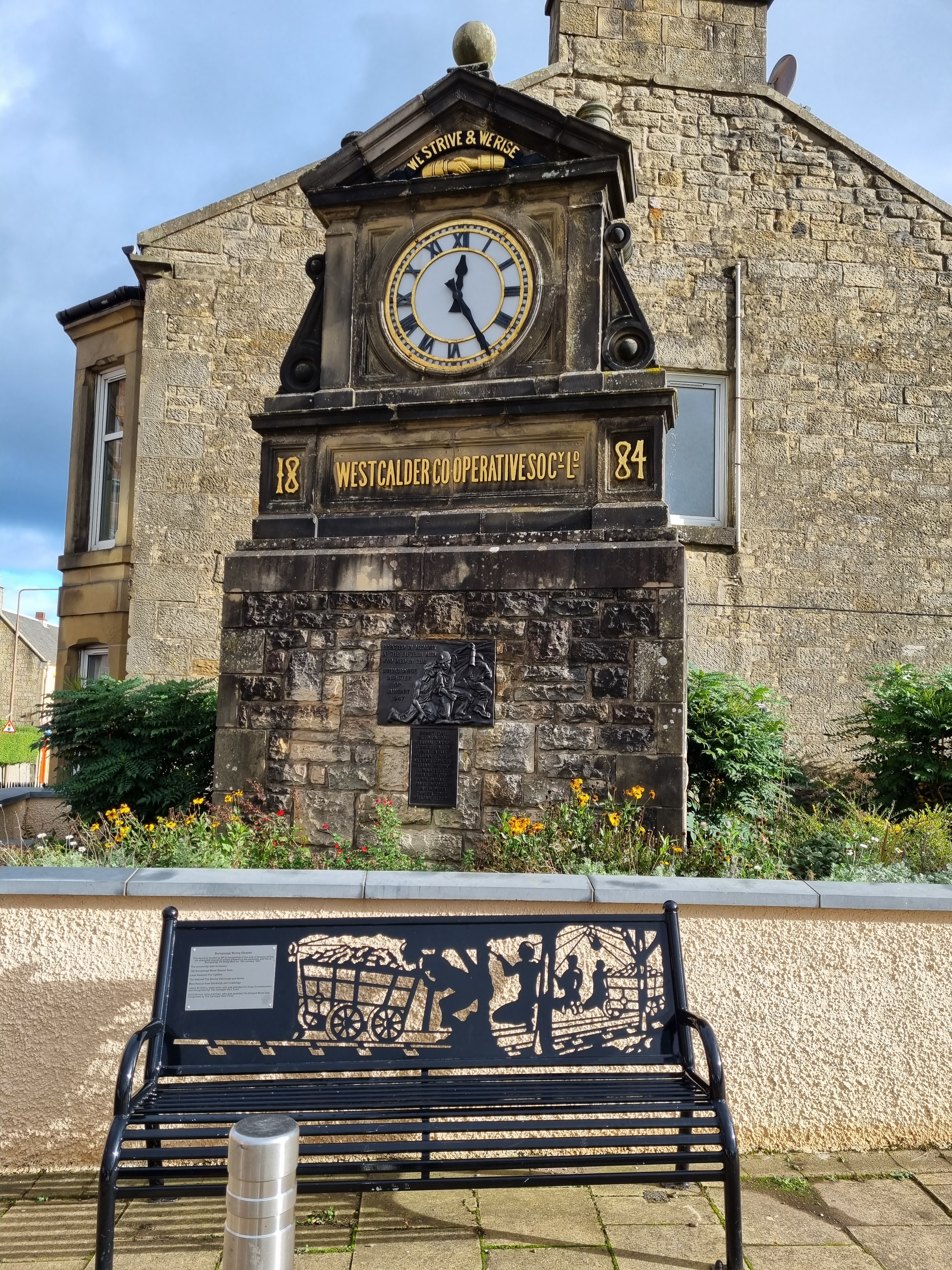
Memorial in West Calder.

Burngrange is an area of the Scottish village West Calder. Situated at the far west of the village it mainly consists of housing constructed for the areas mining industry in the early 20th century. On 10 January 1947, Burngrange was witness to its worst underground mining disaster, in which 15 miners perished.

Burngrange Shale Mine was situated 16 miles south-west of Edinburgh in the Parish of West Calder in the County of Westlothian. It was owned by Young's Paraffin Light & Mineral Oil Co., Ltd., which at the time was a subsidiary of Scottish Oils Ltd and was one of a group of 12 mines working the oil shales in the Counties of Midlothian and West Lothian.

The Report on the causes of, and circumstances attending the Explosion and Fire which occurred at Burngrange Nos. 1 and 2 (Oil Shale) Mine, Midlothian, can be found at.

David Brown was awarded the Edward Medal (later the George Cross) for his actions on the day. He was an overman at the mine.

James McArthur was awarded the King’s Commendation for Brave Conduct. He was a miner who voluntarily became a member of the rescue team.

== Press reports ==
The London Gazette reported on 13 January 1948 that:

"The KING has been pleased to award the Edward Medal to David Brown in recognition of his gallantry in the following circumstances: -

An explosion occurred in the Burngrange Shale Mine, West Calder, Midlothian, at about 8pm on Friday, 10th January, 1947, when 53 persons were at work underground in the district. Firedamp was ignited by an open acetylene cap lamp and the initial explosion started fires which spread rapidly.

David Brown, the overman, descended the pit and proceeded with a fireman to explore the narrow workings where men were trapped. Though they encountered smoke for a time it was not sufficiently dense to prevent progress but as they passed the junction of another heading increasing smoke compelled their withdrawal. After waiting a few minutes Brown made another attempt, alone, to get inbye. He actually got in to No. 3 Dookhead, where he shouted but got no response. He saw no signs, of the inbye men nor of their lights, and he was forced to withdraw again. On his way outbye, he again met the fireman, who said he had been trying to improve the atmospheric conditions in the inbye section by a partial opening of some brattice screen doors, but this step was of no avail. The atmospheric conditions were getting worse all the time, to the spreading of the fires, the extent and seriousness of which even then were not generally realized. Brown, however, did realize the seriousness of the position in relation to the trapped men and immediately sent word explaining the position to the manager who was dealing with fires elsewhere, asking for all possible assistance and making it quite clear that there was no hope of undertaking further exploratory work without the use of rescue teams wearing self-contained breathing apparatus. He then set out to discover for himself where all the smoke was coming from.

Although the National Fire Service was never intended for fire-fighting underground in mines, nevertheless, a team at once volunteered for this duty. Two members of the team donned their one-hour Proto-Breathing Apparatus. Underground, they met the overman, Brown, who pleaded for the use of the two sets of Proto-Apparatus, so that he and another trained member of the Burngrange Mines Rescue Team could make another attempt to get into the workings beyond No. 3 Dook. Using the one-hour apparatus borrowed from the N.F.S. Brown and his companion made an unsuccessful attempt to rescue the trapped men. At 11.15 pm under the captaincy of Brown a fresh team wearing goggles and using a life-line again attempted to reach the men but were forced to return as the temperature was very high and the smoke so dense that their lights could not be seen. There had been a fall of stone and sounds of strata movement were heard. A further attempt along another level led to the discovery of another fire and it became certain that there was no hope of saving the men until this was under control. The work of firefighting continued for four days and it was not until the night of 13th/14th January, that it was considered practicable to send a rescue team beyond the fire area. With one exception the bodies of all the 15 men who lost their lives by the effect of afterdamp and fumes were in No. 3 Dook."

The Scotsman newspaper reported on 30 January 1948:

"The Carnegie Hero Fund Trustees at Dunfermline yesterday awarded an honorary certificate and grants of £25 and £15 respectively to David Brown, mine oversman, 82 Parkhead Crescent, and James M'Arthur, shaleminer, 12 Kirkgate, both of West Calder, Midlothian, who on January 10, 1947, attempted to rescue a number of workmen who had been trapped following an explosion in a colliery at West Calder. Brown has already been awarded the Edward Medal and M'Arthur received the King's Commendation."
