= Brian Eddie =

Scottish footballer

Brian Eddie (born c. 1952) is a Scottish former footballer who played as a defender best known for his time with Dundee United in the early 1970s where he made only three appearances with his debut coming against Celtic at Tannadice on 10 March 1973 in the Scottish First Division. Eddie then went on to play for Stevenage Town.
