= Joe Gould (writer) =

American eccentric (1889–1957)

- Born: Joseph Ferdinand Gould; 12 September 1889; Boston, Massachusetts, U.S.
- Died: 18 August 1957 (aged 67); Pilgrim State Hospital, Long Island, New York, U.S.
- Other name: Professor Seagull
- Education: Harvard University

Joseph Ferdinand Gould (12 September 1889 – 18 August 1957) was an American eccentric, also known as Professor Seagull. Often homeless, he claimed to be the author of the longest book ever written, An Oral History of the Contemporary World, also known as An Oral History of Our Time or Meo Tempore. He inspired the book Joe Gould's Secret (1965) by Joseph Mitchell, and its film adaptation (2000), and is a character in the 2009 computer game The Blackwell Convergence.

== Biography ==
Gould was born in a small suburb outside Boston in 1889. Jill Lepore speculated that he had hypergraphia. In his room at his parents' house, in Norwood, Massachusetts, Gould had written all over the walls and all over the floor. He exhibited what can today be understood as symptoms of autism and did poorly in school. He attended Harvard University because his family wanted him to become a physician; both his grandfather, who taught at Harvard Medical School, and his father, also a medical doctor, had gone to Harvard. During his senior year, he exhibited strong symptoms of mental illness and was kicked out.

Two months after his departure from Harvard, he embarked on a five-hundred-mile walking trip to Canada, exploring its landscape, and then came back to Boston. He applied for readmission to Harvard and was rejected. In 1915, he did field work for the Eugenics Record Office in Cold Spring Harbor. He then went to North Dakota to study the Ojibwe and Mandan cultures. He gained respect for their cultures, and he also learned how to ride horses, dance, and sing. Gould wrote again to Harvard, asking to be allowed to make up his outstanding credits by taking the examination in a class taught by the anthropologist Earnest Hooton. Gould passed, got his degree, and in 1916 moved to New York. At some point in the 1920s he entered Manhattan State Hospital for the Insane, although he never acknowledged having been institutionalized. Here, all his teeth were removed. In the 1920s, a theory of biological psychiatry pioneered by Henry Cotton proposed that abnormal behavior was caused by infected teeth and that the complete removal of teeth would return patients to neurotypical behavior. In fact, Gould likely had autism, and the teeth extraction procedure had a high fatality rate.

After his release, Malcolm Cowley hired him as a regular reviewer for The New Republic, and Gould became known to local modernist artists and writers. In 1942, Horace Gregory told Joseph Mitchell that in 1930, after an "old maid" had Gould arrested for sexually assaulting her, he and Edmund Wilson signed statements attesting to Gould's sanity so that he would not be sent back to an asylum. E. E. Cummings also testified, and Gould was released. As his illness worsened, he lost his reviewing job. His artistic friends, most notably Sarah Berman, wrote stories and harangued editors about him to try to help him, but Gould's condition worsened, and he went in and out of psychiatric hospitals for many years. Jill Lepore speculated that he may have undergone a lobotomy in 1949.

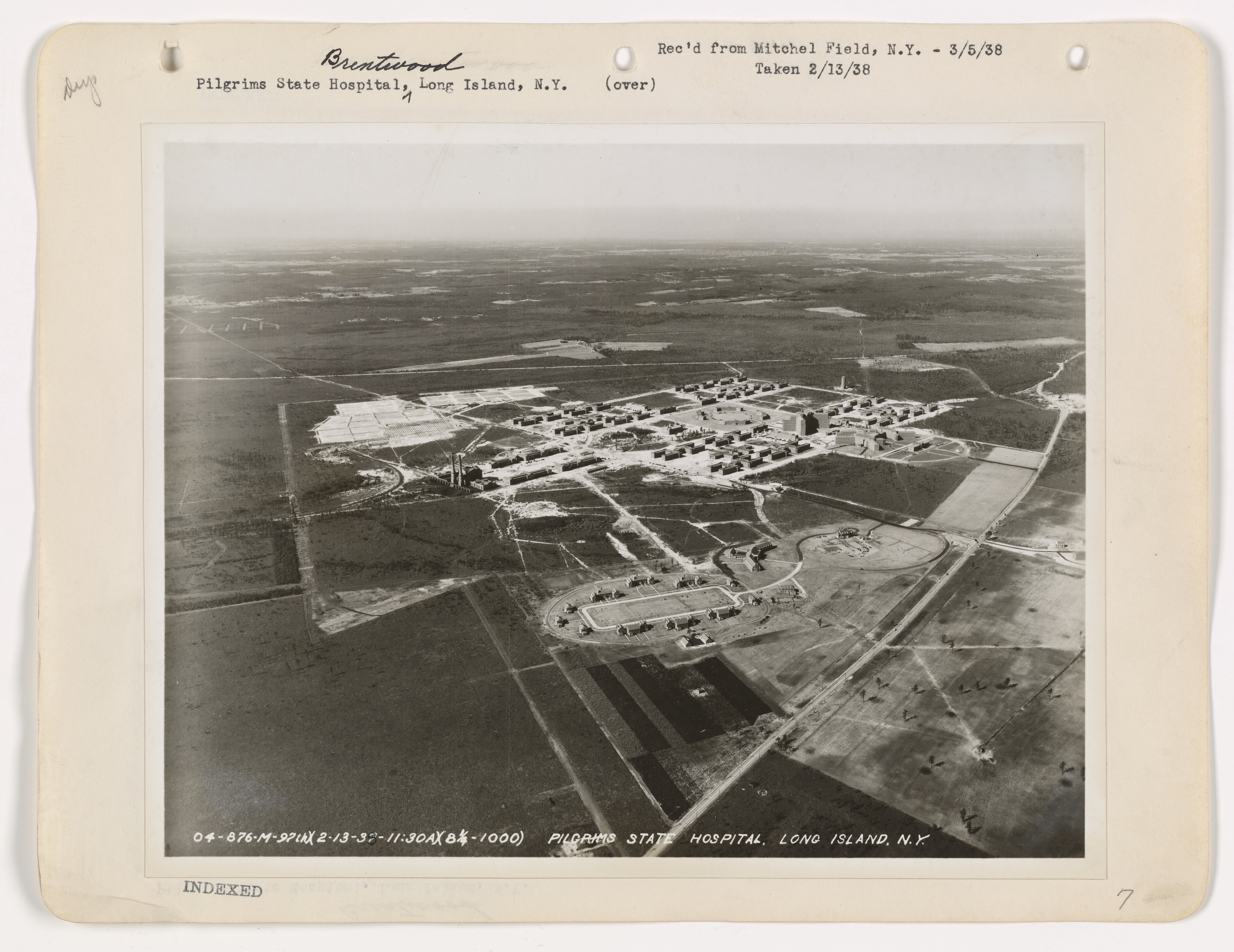
Gould died at Pilgrim State Hospital (pictured in 1938)

Gould collapsed on the street in 1952, eventually ending up in Pilgrim State Hospital on Long Island, where he died in 1957, aged 67. Time ran an obituary for him: "Gould had no known relatives but many friends, including poet E. E. Cummings, artist Don Freeman, Writers Malcolm Cowley and William Saroyan." None attended his funeral.

== An Oral History of Our Time ==
In 1917, Gould worked as a reporter for the New York Evening Mail. During his time at the newspaper, he had his epiphany for the longest book ever written. He would title this book An Oral History of Our Time. The book was supposedly based on a word-for-word account of people's lives, which Gould had listened to. Gould stood about 5 feet 4 inches (1.63 m) and weighed no more than 100 pounds (45 kg), but he said that he hoped his work would make a larger impression. Gould talked about the manuscript frequently, and Mitchell in 1942 suggested that "it may well be the lengthiest unpublished work in existence." Edward J. O'Brien, the editor of Best American Short Stories and a Harvard classmate of Gould's, testified that, "Mr. Ezra Pound and I once saw a fragment of it running to perhaps 40,000 words," and deemed it to have "considerable psychological and historical importance." Pound said: "Mr. Joe Gould's prose style is uneven." "My history is uneven," Gould admitted. "It should be. It is an encyclopedia."

In the October, 1923 issue of Broom: An International Magazine of the Arts, Malcolm Cowley and Slater Brown covered Joe Gould. The issue contained the "Portrait of Joe Gould" illustration by Joseph Stella, the biographical sketch "Joseph Gould: The Man" by Edward Nagle and Slater Brown, and Gould's own "Social Position (Chapter CCCLXVIII of Joseph Gould's History of the Contemporary World, to be published posthumously.)".

The poet Marianne Moore, as editor of The Dial, published in the April, 1929 issue, under the heading "From Joe Gould's Oral History", the two chapters "Marriage" and "Civilization". She solicited further work from Gould before The Dial folded in 1929.

In 1964, after Gould's death, Joseph Mitchell published the second of two profiles he would write of Gould for The New Yorker, later collected in the 1965 book, Joe Gould's Secret, in which Mitchell asserted that the Oral History never really existed as anything more than a few chapters. Mitchell argued that the snippets Gould had published, were in fact just being re-written over and over again throughout Gould's later years and deluded himself and the public that his great Oral History was still being written. However, upon the publication of Mitchell's piece, people began to write to him and sent him notebook copies of the oral history, as evidence of a more extensive existence.

Digging into this mystery in her 2015 work for The New Yorker, "Joe Gould's Teeth" (later developed into a book by the same name), Dr. Jill Lepore, professor of history at Harvard University, meticulously investigated not only the question behind Gould's Oral History but the history of Gould himself.

By combing through source evidence in Mitchell's papers, which had recently been deposited at the New York Public Library, Lepore discovered not only letters from the readers who had seen the notebooks, but she also found at least one volume of the Oral History itself. However, Lepore's research exposed deeper questions related to Gould and the mystery of his famed History, going well beyond the debates surrounding it's existence. She did in fact find a darker story hidden behind the long held narrative that Gould was simply a brilliant artist and harmless eccentric. The reality of Joe Gould, it became clear, was far more complicated. Stories relating to deep and reoccurring mental illness, racism, predation, and violent obsession.

== Gould and Augusta Savage ==
Among the readers that Lepore uncovered who wrote to Mitchell in 1964, was the writer Millen Brand, who told Mitchell that the Oral History had existed, that he had read much of it, and that the longest piece within the history concerned the sculptor and prominent artist of the Harlem Renaissance, Augusta Savage. Gould, Brand reported, had been violently obsessed with her, and had harassed and stalked her for years.

When Lepore reviewed letters between Gould and his friends regarding Savage, seeming to support Brand's claims, Lepore stated that she saw, “hints … of violence, and even of rape.” Lepore surmises that Savage left New York to escape Gould because as Brand recounted, she lived in terror of him, and as a Black woman, never received the necessary help or intervention needed by police. Mitchell never reported any of this.

== Representations and legacy ==
One of Gould's pastimes was going to beatnik poetry readings in New York, where he recited absurd poems he made up to mock the serious poetry of other participants. PM news photographer Ray Platnick photographed for a feature on Greenwich Village poets, including Gould along with Diana Barrett Moulton and Maxwell Bodenheim in eccentric poses in front of their verses scrawled on the walls of the Village Arts Center at 1 Charles St. Gould claimed to understand the behavior and language of seagulls, saying that he had translated the works of Henry Wadsworth Longfellow into their language.

William Saroyan wrote a short story about Gould in his 1971 book, Letters from 74 rue Taitbout or Don't Go But If You Must Say Hello To Everybody.

Ian Holm portrayed Gould in the 2000 film Joe Gould's Secret, an adaptation of Mitchell's book.

Gould is mentioned in several poems by E. E. Cummings and in the letters of Gaston Lachaise.

He was referenced in Blackwell, an adventure game series developed by Wadjet Eye Games, and appeared as a spirit in the third game, The Blackwell Convergence.

He made two brief appearances in And The Hippos Were Boiled in Their Tanks, co-authored by William S. Burroughs and Jack Kerouac, set in 1944, but finally published in 2008.

He is a minor character in Broadway Revival, a 2021 novel by Laura Frankos.

Joe Gould is the centerpiece of Dr. Jill Lepore's historical non-fiction work, Joe Gould's Teeth and is also a major historical figure discussed in Lepore's podcast, The Last Archive, Season 2, Episode 9, "Epiphany."
