= Joseph Mitchell (writer) =

American writer (1908–1996)

- Born: Joseph Quincy Mitchell; July 27, 1908 Fairmont, North Carolina, U.S.
- Died: May 24, 1996 (aged 87) New York City, New York, U.S.
- Occupation: Writer

Joseph Quincy Mitchell (July 27, 1908 – May 24, 1996) was an American writer best known for the work he published in The New Yorker. He is known for his carefully written portraits of eccentrics and people on the fringes of society, especially in and around New York City. He is also known for suffering from writer's block for several decades.

== Biography ==
Mitchell was born on his maternal grandparents' farm near Fairmont, North Carolina, the son of Averette Nance and Elizabeth Amanda Parker Mitchell. He had five younger siblings; Jack, Elizabeth, Linda, Harry, and Laura. The family business was cotton and tobacco trading, and family money helped to support Mitchell throughout his life. He attended the University of North Carolina at Chapel Hill from 1925 to 1929 but failed to take a degree.

Mitchell came to New York City in 1929, at the age of 21, with the ambition of becoming a political reporter. He worked for such newspapers as The World, the New York Herald Tribune, and the New York World-Telegram, at first covering crime and then doing interviews, profiles, and character sketches. In 1931, he took a break from journalism to work on a freighter that sailed to Leningrad and brought back pulp logs to New York City.

On February 27, 1932, he married Therese Jacobsen, a reporter and photographer. They had two daughters, Nora and Elizabeth. He returned to journalism later that year and continued to write for New York newspapers until he was hired by St. Clair McKelway at The New Yorker in 1938. He remained with the magazine until his death in 1996.

External image
- Joseph Mitchell (left) outside Sloppy Louie's restaurant with Louis Morino, subject of "Up in the Old Hotel".

His book Up in the Old Hotel collects the best of his writing for The New Yorker, and his earlier book My Ears Are Bent collects the best of his early journalistic writing, which he omitted from Up in the Old Hotel.

Mitchell's last book was his empathetic account of the Greenwich Village street character and self-proclaimed historian Joe Gould's extravagantly disguised case of writer's block, published as Joe Gould's Secret (1964).

=== Writer's block ===
From 1964 until his death in 1996, Mitchell would go to work at his office on a daily basis, but he never published anything significant again. After he died, his colleague Roger Angell wrote:

Each morning, he stepped out of the elevator with a preoccupied air, nodded wordlessly if you were just coming down the hall, and closed himself in his office. He emerged at lunchtime, always wearing his natty brown fedora (in summer, a straw one) and a tan raincoat; an hour and a half later, he reversed the process, again closing the door. Not much typing was heard from within, and people who called on Joe reported that his desktop was empty of everything but paper and pencils. When the end of the day came, he went home. Sometimes, in the evening elevator, I heard him emit a small sigh, but he never complained, never explained.

Mitchell once remarked to Washington Post writer David Streitfeld, "You pick someone so close that, in fact, you are writing about yourself. Joe Gould had to leave home because he didn't fit in, the same way I had to leave home because I didn't fit in. Talking to Joe Gould all those years he became me in a way, if you see what I mean."

Mitchell served on the board of directors of the Gypsy Lore Society, was one of the founders of the South Street Seaport Museum, was involved with the Friends of Cast-Iron Architecture, and served five years on the New York City Landmarks Preservation Commission. In August 1937, he placed third in a clam-eating tournament on Block Island by eating 84 cherrystone clams. He died of cancer at Columbia-Presbyterian Medical Center in Manhattan at the age of 87.

In 2008, The Library of America selected Mitchell’s story "Execution" for inclusion in its two-century retrospective of American True Crime.

The February 11, 2013 edition of The New Yorker includes a previously unpublished piece of Mitchell's entitled "Street Life: Becoming Part of the City."

A biography of Mitchell was published in 2015 by Thomas Kunkel titled Man in Profile: Joseph Mitchell of The New Yorker. Janet Malcolm, an acquaintance of Mitchell at The New Yorker, wrote a review in The New York Review of Books.

== In popular culture ==
In 2000, Joe Gould's Secret, a feature film directed by Stanley Tucci and written by Howard A. Rodman, was released. It focuses on the relationship between Mitchell (played by Tucci) and Joe Gould (Ian Holm) during the 1940s.

Mitchell is portrayed in The Blackwell Series, an indie computer game series revolving around paranormal themes. In the second game of the series, the player encounters Mitchell during the prolonged writer's block of his later years. In the third game of the series, the player encounters ghosts of both Mitchell and Joe Gould.

== Bibliography ==
=== Books ===
- My Ears Are Bent. Vintage Books. 1938.
- McSorley's Wonderful Saloon. Pantheon Books. 1943. ISBN 978-0375421020.
- Old Mr. Flood. MacAdam/Cage. 1948. ISBN 978-1596921146.
- The Bottom of the Harbor. Pantheon Books. 1959. ISBN 978-0375714863.
- Joe Gould's Secret. Modern Library. 1965. ISBN 978-0679601845.
- Up in the Old Hotel and Other Stories. Pantheon Books. 1992. ISBN 978-0679412632. Omnibus volume comprising McSorley's Wonderful Saloon, Old Mr. Flood, The Bottom of the Harbor, and Joe Gould's Secret

=== Essays and reporting ===
- "Street Life". The New Yorker. 89 (1): 62–69. February 11–18, 2013.
- "A Place of Pasts: Finding Worlds in the City". The New Yorker. 91 (1): 32–35. February 16, 2015.

=== Critical studies and reviews of Mitchell's work ===
- Kunkel, Thomas. Man in Profile: Joseph Mitchell of The New Yorker. New York: Random House, 2015. ISBN 978-0-375-50890-5
