= Joe Gould's Secret (film) =

2000 American drama film by Stanley Tucci

- DVD cover
- Directed by: Stanley Tucci
- Written by: Howard A. Rodman
- Based on: Joe Gould’s Secret by Joseph Mitchell
- Produced by: Elizabeth Alexander; Stanley Tucci; Charles Weinstock
- Starring: Stanley Tucci; Ian Holm; Patricia Clarkson; Hope Davis; Susan Sarandon
- Narrated by: Stanley Tucci
- Cinematography: Maryse Alberti
- Edited by: Suzy Elmiger
- Music by: Evan Lurie
- Production company: October Films
- Distributed by: USA Films
- Release dates: January 21, 2000 (Sundance); April 7, 2000 (United States)
- Running time: 104 minutes
- Country: United States
- Language: English
- Box office: $468,684

Joe Gould's Secret is a 2000 American drama film directed by Stanley Tucci. The screenplay by Howard A. Rodman is based on the magazine article Professor Sea Gull and the book Joe Gould's Secret by Joseph Mitchell.

== Plot synopsis ==
Set in Manhattan in the early 1940s, the film focuses on the relationship between Joseph Mitchell, a writer for The New Yorker, and Joe Gould, an aging, bearded, disheveled bohemian and Harvard University graduate who wanders through the streets of Greenwich Village carrying a tattered portfolio and demanding donations to "The Joe Gould Fund". At times Gould is calmly sweet and perceptive, at others he's a pathological liar and an obnoxious drunk, and he frequently experiences sudden outbursts of rage. Earning occasional financial support from poet E. E. Cummings, portrait painter Alice Neel, Village Vanguard founder Max Gordon, art gallery owner Vivian Marquie, and even the sculptor Gaston Lachaise, Gould is able to secure a nightly room in flophouses until an anonymous benefactor arranges accommodations in a residential hotel for him.

Gould allegedly is collecting the observations of average citizens to incorporate into his oral history of the world, fragments of which he has given to various people for safekeeping. Mitchell meets him in a coffee shop and initially is fascinated by the colorful character. However, with the passage of time, as Gould becomes irritatingly intrusive and demanding, disrupting the ordinary life Mitchell shares with his photographer wife and their two daughters, the journalist begins to question if the elderly man's 9 million-word opus actually exists or is merely a figment of his imagination.

== Cast ==
- Ian Holm as Joe Gould
- Stanley Tucci as Joe Mitchell
- Hope Davis as Therese Mitchell
- Hallee Hirsh as Nora Mitchell
- Sarah Hyland as Elizabeth Mitchell
- Celia Weston as Sarah
- Susan Sarandon as Alice Neel
- Patricia Clarkson as Vivian Marquie
- Steve Martin as Charlie Duell
- David Wohl as Max Gordon
- Harry Bugin as Newsman

== Production ==
One scene with Mitchell and Neel takes place at a gallery filled with the work of Gaston Lachaise, and was filmed at Salander-O'Reilly Galleries, at 20 East 79th.

The film's soundtrack includes a number of period songs performed by Dinah Washington, Count Basie, Josephine Baker, Woody Herman, Charlie Parker, Perry Como, Louis Armstrong, Coleman Hawkins, and Geoffrey Menin among others.

== Release ==
The film premiered at the Sundance Film Festival in January 2000. It opened on five screens in New York City and Los Angeles on April 7 and grossed $38,760 on its opening weekend. It eventually earned $468,684 in the US.

== Reception ==
On review aggregator website Rotten Tomatoes, the film holds an approval rating of 65%, based on 34 reviews, and an average rating of 6.7/10. On Metacritic, the film has a weighted average score of 74 out of 100, based on 23 critics, indicating "generally favorable" reviews.

Stephen Holden of The New York Times said, "Sir Ian's ranting, fiery-eyed performance is the brilliant spark that ignites this otherwise rather somnolent film ... The movie does a lovely job of evoking a boozy 1940's Greenwich Village of poetry readings, cavernous bars and raucous parties ... Despite its rich period ambience and Sir Ian's fiery acting, the movie never brings Mitchell's relationship to Gould into clear enough focus ... Lacking dramatic tension, Joe Gould's Secret settles for being an atmospheric scenes-in-the-life biography of someone's most unforgettable character. It could have been so much more."

Roger Ebert of the Chicago Sun-Times observed, "Stanley Tucci is a director and actor with an openhearted generosity for his characters; he loves and forgives them ... Here he's made a chamber piece of quiet scenes, acutely heard dialogue and subterranean emotional shifts ... There is a dark, deep and sad undercurrent in the movie ... Some have said the film is too quiet and slow. There is anguish here that makes American Beauty pale by comparison."

Edward Guthman of the San Francisco Chronicle stated, "[Ian Holm] nails one of the best roles of his career ... [Tucci] directs with quiet affection and rare restraint."

Edvins Beitiks of the San Francisco Examiner said, "The good looks, sounds, sights and acting ... owe a lot to director Stanley Tucci ... Holm and Tucci are as brilliant in Secret as they were in Big Night ... The cast is outstanding ... but the movie belongs to Tucci and Gould with no room, really, for anyone else."
