= Harburn, West Lothian =

Village and estate in Scotland

Coordinates: 55.8375°N 3.5310°W

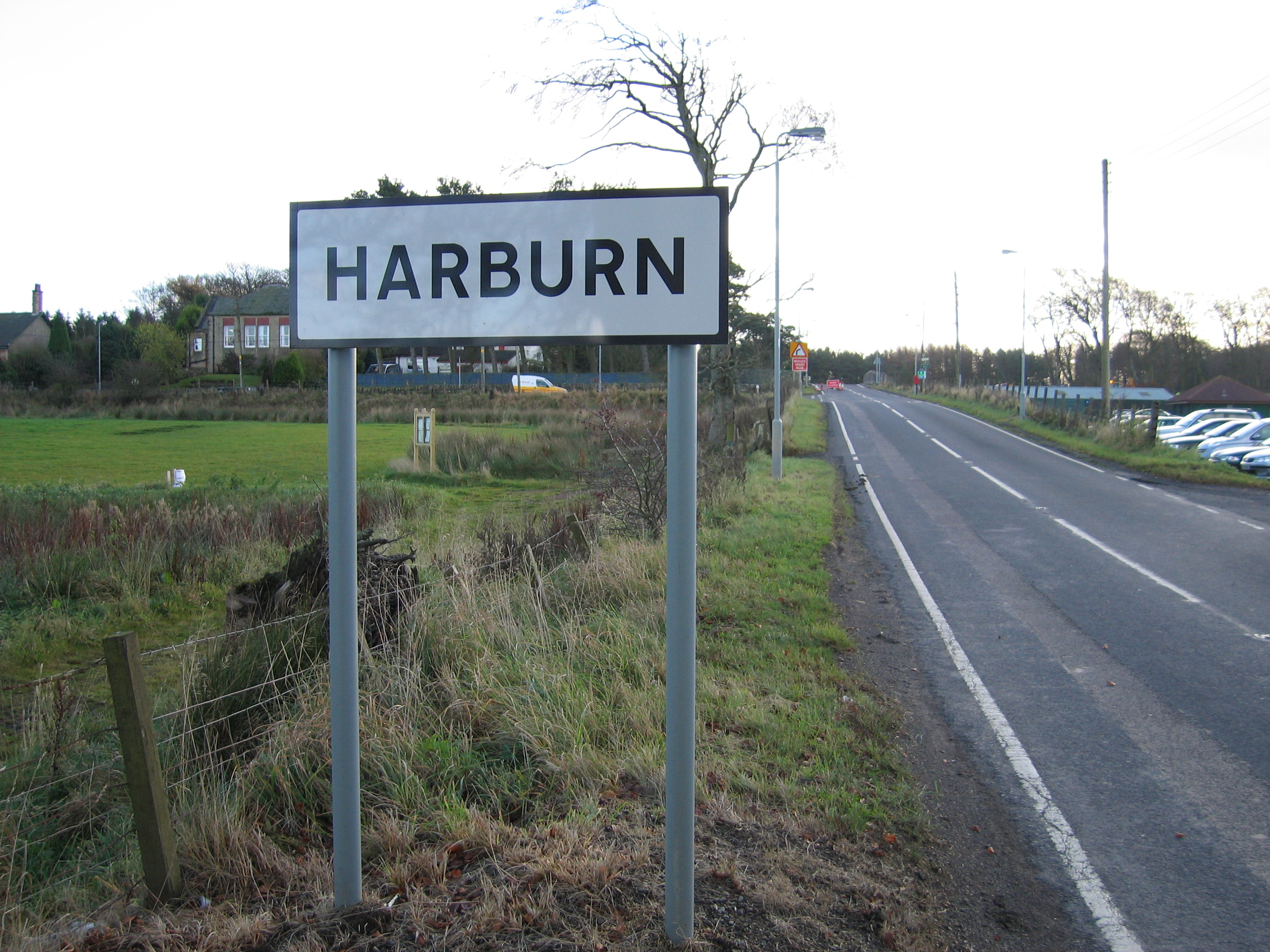
Harburn village sign.

Harburn is a small village and estate in West Lothian, Scotland. It lies approximately 2 miles south-east of West Calder and just to the north of the Pentland Hills.

The Harburn estate is a 19th century landscaped park and country house estate, primarily laid out in 1808. Harburn House is a Category B listed 18th century country-house that was built in 1804 for Alexander Young (1757-1842), factor to the Duke of Hamilton. It replaced an early property, Hayfield House and there are also records of a Harburn Castle, recorded as being fortified during Cromwell's invasions. The stables are also early 19th century and are Category B listed.

In 1832, King Charles X of France visited Harburn and a monument to his visit, in the form of a stone column was erected.

== Culture ==
Harburn village hill is a local community facility that was built in 1923 as a gift to the community from King George V for the villages contribution to the war effort at the nearby gunpowder mill.

Harburn golf course is an 18 golf course on the western edge of Harburn that was created in its present location in 1932.

== Camilty ==
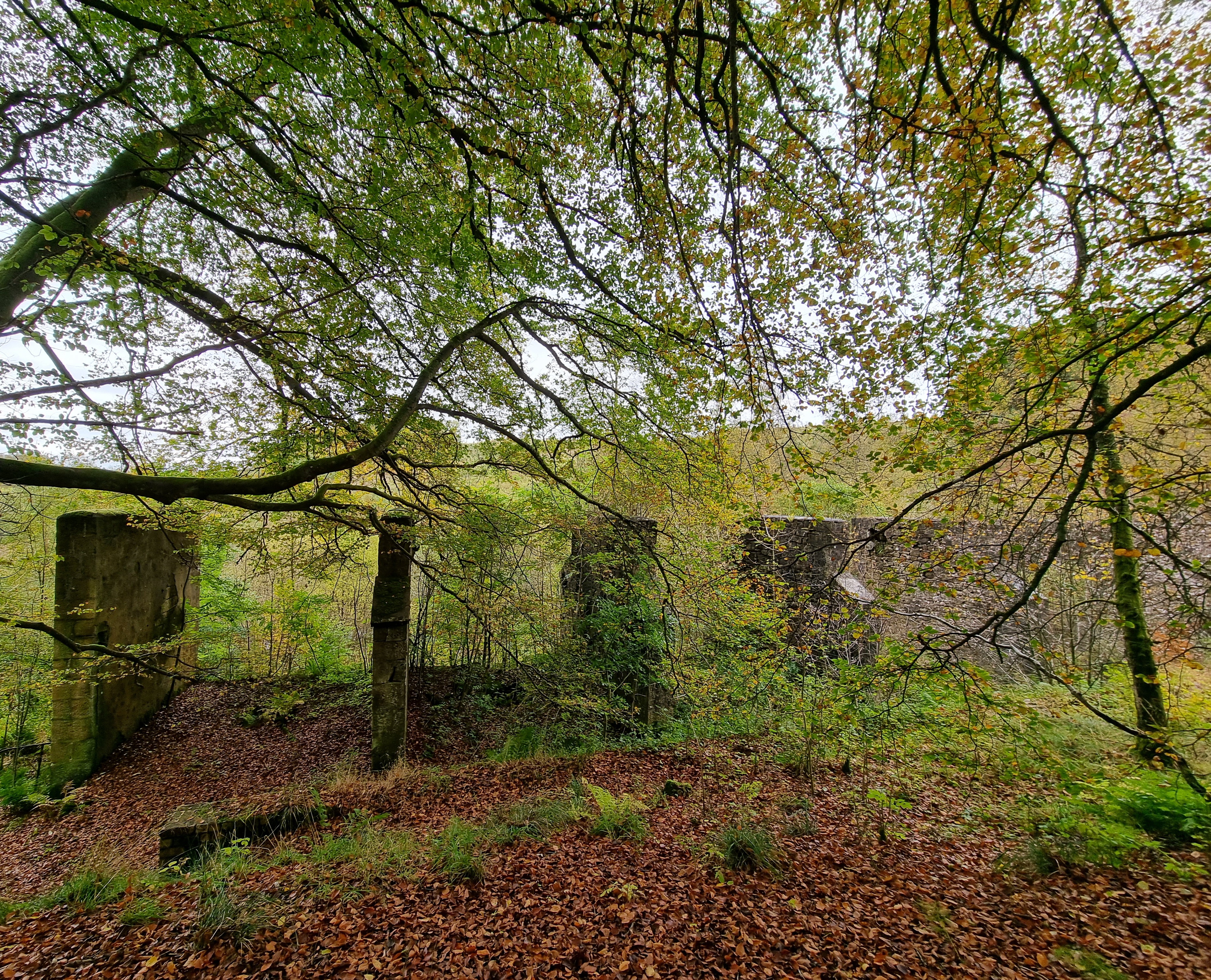
Camilty Gunpowder Mill Ruins.

Camilty is a plantation and forest area on the southern and eastern edge of Harburn. The area produces trees for sale as christmas trees. Permission was given in 2021 for a six large wind turbines to be built on the plantation.

Camilty Gunpowder mill is a large ruined powder mill on private land near the Harburn estate that produced explosives, primarily for blasting in the local shale industry. In the First World War the facility produced munitions and armaments. The mill was in production from 1890 to 1929 and was operated by Midlothian Gunpowder Company. It was later owned by Curtis and Harvey and then passed to Nobel Enterprises before being closed following a period of decline in shale mining. The mill was powered by a weir built at the end of the 19th century.

Castle Greg is located on the southern edge of Harburn. The castle is the archaeological remains of a Roman fortlet.

== Transport ==
The Caledonian Railway line, built circa 1850, cuts through the north-west boundary of the Harburn Estate. The nearest railway station is West Calder railway station. The B7008 forms the south-west boundary of Harburn. The A70 road connecting Edinburgh with Lanark lies to the south-east of Harburn.
