= John Kane (artist) =

American painter

- Born: August 19, 1860; West Calder, Scotland
- Died: August 10, 1934 (aged 73); Pittsburgh, Pennsylvania, U.S.
- Known for: Painting
- Movement: Naïve art

John Kane (August 19, 1860 — August 10, 1934) was an American painter celebrated for his skill in Naïve art.

He was the first self-taught American painter in the 20th century to be recognized by a museum. When, on his third attempt, his work was admitted to the 1927 Carnegie International Exhibition, he attracted considerable attention from the media, which initially suspected that his success was a prank. He inadvertently paved the way for other self-taught artists, from Grandma Moses to Outsider Art. Today Kane is remembered for his landscape paintings of industrial Pittsburgh, many of which are held by major museums such as the Museum of Modern Art, Carnegie Museum of Art, Whitney Museum of American Art, and the Metropolitan Museum of Art.

== Early life ==
He was born John Cain to Irish parents in West Calder, Scotland, on August 19, 1860. His father died when he was age 10, leaving behind a widow and 7 children. His father was employed as a grave digger in West Calder, it is said that he dug a grave on Friday and filled it on Monday. The young Kane quit school to work in the shale mines. He actually worked at Youngs Paraffin works and was so struck with the malleability of the hot paraffin moulds that he made a mask of his own face for his mother Biddy. Naturally he burned his face, but not too seriously. After his mother remarried, he emigrated to the United States at age 19, following his stepfather and older brother Patrick, who had preceded him to America and were working in Braddock, Pennsylvania, just east of Pittsburgh.

== Early career in the United States ==
He first worked for the Baltimore and Ohio Railroad in McKeesport, Pennsylvania as a gandy dancer, one who stamps down stones between the railroad ties. Next he worked a stint in the steel industry at the National Tube Company in McKeesport, but soon left for a job in Connellsville, Pennsylvania, at the coke ovens of Henry Clay Frick.

In the mid-1880s Kane moved on to mine coal in Alabama, Tennessee, and Kentucky, but he returned to Western Pennsylvania, where he got other mining jobs, in order to be closer to his family.

== Accident ==
In 1891, while he was walking along the B&O railroad tracks, an engine running without its lights struck down Kane, severing his left leg 5 inches below the knee. He was fitted with an artificial limb, and his disability landed him a new job with the B&O as a watchman. He was a watchman for eight years.

== Artistic career ==
He left his watchman job to paint steel railroad cars at the Pressed Steel Car Company in McKees Rocks, Pennsylvania, on the Ohio River just northwest of downtown Pittsburgh. He began to draw on the side of railroad cars on his lunch hour to "fill in the colors". His sketched landscapes disappeared after lunch beneath the standard, solid color of the railroad car paint. For a short time he tried to earn money by enlarging and tinting photographs for working-class families.

Kane had married Maggie Halloran in 1897 at St. Mary's Catholic Church in downtown Pittsburgh. The death of an infant son in 1904 led him into a vortex of drinking and depression, which caused long periods of wandering, during which he worked as an itinerant house painter and carpenter. In Akron, Ohio, in 1910 he first began to do pictorial paintings on discarded boards from construction sites. By the end of World War I, Kane was again in Pittsburgh, where he spent the remainder of his life. He remained separated from his wife and children.

In both 1925 and 1926 he submitted paintings to the Carnegie Internationals sponsored by the Carnegie Museum of Art, but the works were rejected. The next year, however, Kane found a champion in painter–juror Andrew Dasburg, who persuaded the jury to accept Kane's Scene in the Scottish Highlands (Carnegie Museum, Pittsburgh). The story of the untrained 67-year-old painter's success was trumpeted by the newspapers. The publicity around the show came to the notice of Kane's wife, who was living in West Virginia, and with whom he'd lost contact for over ten years. They reconciled and remained together during the last years of his life.

When it was discovered that he had painted over discarded photographic images, purely for financial reasons, he was hounded by newspapers and unsuccessful artists who claimed him a sham. Kane continued to paint his primitive landscapes and self-portraits, including his famous Self-portrait (1929) in the collection of MoMA, New York. He had his first New York one-man show in 1931.

Kane worked with Pittsburgh author and newspaper reporter, Marie McSwigan, to write Sky Hooks The Autobiography of John Kane. McSwigan recorded Kane's life story as he told it to her during the last two years of his life.

John Kane died of tuberculosis on August 10, 1934, and is interred at Pittsburgh's Roman Catholic Calvary Cemetery. His works are now represented in major museums and collections, including the Museum of Modern Art, New York, the Zander Collection in Cologne, the Whitney Museum of American Art, New York, the Smithsonian Institution, and above all the Carnegie Museum of Art in Pittsburgh.
