= Israel Ber Neumann =

German-US art dealer and publisher

- J. B. Neumann portrait by Otto Dix, 1922
- Born: 2 March 1887; Skole, Galicia, Austria-Hungary (now in Lviv Oblast, Ukraine)
- Died: 28 April 1961 (aged 73); New York City, New York, United States
- Other names: J. B. Neumann; Jsrael Ber Neumann; I.B. Neumann
- Occupations: Art dealer, publisher

Israel Ber Neumann (1887–1961) was an Austria-Hungarian-born German and American art dealer and publisher, who was instrumental in the establishment of 20th-century art in Germany and the United States. He was also known by the names Jsrael Ber Neumann, J. B. Neumann, and I. B. Neumann.

== Early life ==
Israel Ber Neumann, usually known as I.B. Neumann, was born on 2 March 1887 in Skole, Galicia, Austria-Hungary (now in Lviv Oblast, Ukraine). His father was an oil and lumber dealer. Neumann initially studied business but when he was nineteen began an apprenticeship to a book and picture dealer.

In 1910, Neumann returned to Berlin, Germany and in 1911 opened a book and art shop where he exhibited the work of Edvard Munch and others. Neumann had many friends who were artists and in 1915–1916 he was secretary to the Berlin Secession, a prominent German artist association. By 1922 Neumann had branch offices in Bremen, Düsseldorf and Munich.

== Art dealer in New York ==
Neumann emigrated to the United States in 1923. Management of I. B. Neumann's Berlin gallery was taken over first by Alfred Flechtheim and then Karl Nierendorf. The Frankfurt shop was managed by his employee Günther Franke.

In 1924 Neumann opened a 57th Street gallery and bookshop, first called J.B. Neumann's Print Room and later the New Art Circle gallery.

Neumann edited the magazine Artlover.

He exhibited artists such as Max Beckmann, Conrad Felixmüller, Otto Dix, and Rudolf Schlichter at the very beginning of their careers.

He died on 28 April 1961, in New York City. Part of his written estate, including an unpublished autobiography, and the estate of his gallery are in the archives of the Museum of Modern Art in New York.

== Controversy concerning Nazi-looted art ==
I. B. Neumann's name became involved in an art restitution lawsuit filed by the heirs to Alfred Flechtheim in 2016. In Hulton et al v, Bayerische Staatsgemaldesammlungen et al, U.S. District Court, Southern District of New York, No. 16-09360, the heirs of Alfred Flechtheim claimed that six works by Beckmann (Duchess of Malvedi (1926), Still Life with Cigar Box (1926), Still Life with Studio Window (1931), Dream—Chinese Fireworks (1927), Champagne Still Life (1929), Quappi in Blue (1926) ); one work by Gris (Cruche et verre sur un table (1916) ); and one work by Klee (Grenzen des Verstandes (1927) should be restituted by the Bavarian State Paintings Collection because of their loss due to the Aryanization by Nazis of Flechtheim's art gallery. The plaintiffs and the defendants disagreed over whether I.B. Neumann ever owned the artworks in question. Bavaria (BSGS) asserted that Flechtheim had freely sold the artworks to Neumann, but the Flechtheim family asserted that such a sale was baseless speculation contradicted by the sources invented to conceal Nazi looting. The issue was not decided as the case was dismissed because of the protections offered to Germany by the Foreign Sovereign Immunities Act, which the judge ruled provides foreign states with a broad grant of immunity.

== Literature ==
- Penny Bealle: J. B. Neumann and the Introduction of Modern German Art to New York, 1923–1933. In: Archives of American Art Journal. Bd. 29, Nr. 1/2, 1989, ISSN 0003-9853, S. 3–15.
- Karl-Heinz Meißner: Israel Ber Neumann. Kunsthändler – Verleger. S. 215–224 in Avantgarde und Publikum : zur Rezeption avantgardistischer Kunst in Deutschland 1905-1933. Henrike Junge-Gent. Köln: Böhlau. 1992. ISBN 3-412-02792-8. OCLC 27711829.
- Felix Billeter: Das "Graphische Kabinett J. B. Neumann" in München 1923–1933. S. 256–267 In: Münchner Moderne : Kunst und Architektur der zwanziger Jahre. Felix Billeter, Antje Günther, Steffen Krämer. München: Deutscher Kunstverlag. 2002. ISBN 3-422-06340-4. OCLC 52109433.
- Langfeld, Gregor (2011). Deutsche Kunst in New York : Vermittler, Kunstsammler, Ausstellungsmacher, 1904-1957. Berlin: Dietrich Reimer. ISBN 978-3-496-01446-1. OCLC 731901358.
- Max Beckmann und J. B. Neumann der Künstler und sein Händler in Briefen und Dokumenten 1917 - 1950. Max Beckmann, J. B. Neumann, Ursula Harter, Stephan von Wiese. Köln. 2011. ISBN 978-3-86560-795-9. OCLC 767949126.

== Links ==
- Hulton et al v, Bayerische Staatsgemaldesammlungen et al, U.S. District Court, Southern District of New York, No. 16-09360
