= Joe Gould's Secret =

1965 nonfiction book by Joseph Mitchell

- Author: Joseph Mitchell
- Language: English
- Genre: Nonfiction
- Publisher: Viking Press
- Publication date: 1965
- Publication place: United States
- Media type: Print
- Pages: 208
- ISBN: 0-375-70804-9
- OCLC: 42877080

Joe Gould's Secret is a 1965 book by Joseph Mitchell, based upon his two New Yorker profiles, "Professor Sea Gull" (1942) and "Joe Gould's Secret" (1964). Mitchell's work details the true story of the eponymous Joe Gould, a writer who lived in Greenwich Village in the first half of the 20th century. Gould was an eccentric, bridging the gap between bohemianism and the Beat Generation, though he was an outspoken critic of both. This criticism alienated him from the social circles of poets, authors, and artists of his time, and instead he focused on documenting the history of what he called the "shirt-sleeved multitude."

== Plot ==
By observing the lives of those around him and recording the goings-on, Gould set about compiling an exhaustive record of modern life he called the "Oral History." He claimed that oral history held more truth than the formalized history of textbooks and professors, as it gave voices to the lower classes that were representative of true humanity. In the 1920s, Gould had small portions of his "Oral History" published in magazines, but in the years that followed he became more secretive and eccentric. He was well known among the local shopkeepers, artists, and restaurateurs, many of whom gave him handouts of money or food in support of his project.

Mitchell met Gould in 1942 and wrote the profile "Professor Sea Gull" on him for The New Yorker. The first part of Joe Gould's Secret is made up of this profile, covering the period from Gould's graduation from Harvard University in 1911, leading up to the writing of his "Oral History", said to be composed of 20,000 conversations and 9,000,000 words. The second part of the book is a more personal memoir of Mitchell's experiences with Gould, their eventual falling out, and his discovery of Joe Gould's secret: that the "Oral History" did not exist.

Gould suffered from writer's block and hypergraphia; while to those around him he appeared to be taking constant notes—a notion he was happy to reinforce—he was, in fact, re-writing the same few chapters dealing with seemingly trivial events in his own early life. He had filled countless notebooks with edited versions of these events, evidently searching for meaning in the revisions. Out of respect, Mitchell waited several years after Gould's death to reveal the secret. He wrote the second article in 1964, and combined it with the original article in book form in 1965. Mitchell's pieces on Gould were later collected along with many of his other prominent works in the volume Up in the Old Hotel, published in 1992.

== Film adaptation ==
A film adaptation of Mitchell's stories on Gould, written and directed by Stanley Tucci, was released in 2000 as an independent starring Ian Holm as Gould, Tucci as Mitchell, and Hope Davis as Mitchell's wife, with Susan Sarandon and Steve Martin in supporting roles.

The film met with critical success, but remains relatively little-known. Several years after its release, it was praised as "a beautifully realized visual re-creation of exactly the time and place — Greenwich Village in the mid-1940s — when the Hippos story [by Burroughs and Kerouac] takes place, and thus the reader might do well to screen the movie to help in reimagining these settings, so distant now in time." The sets were created by Broadway and film designer Andrew Jackness.
