= Robert M. Ellis =

Robert M. Ellis (April 14, 1922 – September 13, 2014) was an American artist. His professional career spanned six decades as an artist, educator, and museum director, including eight years as Curator of Education at the Pasadena Art Museum in California, twenty-three years on the art faculty of University of New Mexico, in Albuquerque, and ten years as director of UNM's Harwood Museum of Art in Taos, New Mexico. His work is in numerous museum collections, including the Albuquerque Museum of Art and History, New Mexico Museum of Art in Santa Fe, and Roswell Museum and Art Center. Apart from his distinguished career as a painter, Ellis left an indelible mark on the art world in both southern California and northern New Mexico.

== Biography ==
Ellis was born in Cleveland, Ohio in 1922. According to art writer MaLin Wilson-Powell in her essay "Bob Ellis: Navigating Portals of Perception, from Aegean Temples to Woodcuts, 2004 - 2011", the trajectory of Ellis's professional career began with his All-American Midwestern roots, "opening day at the Cleveland Indians, nickel ice cream cones, the Cleveland Museum's Classical and Medieval Armor Court and their free Saturday classes . . ."

After three years of architectural studies at Case Western, his comfortable circumstances came to an abrupt end in 1942 with the death of his father. At age twenty, faced with the prospect of being drafted into the military, Ellis enlisted in the Seabees, as the Navy Construction Division is known, and served in U.S. Navy in WWII from 1942 to 1946. During his military service, Ellis became a navigator and third in command of a huge transport ship in the Pacific Theater.

After the War, like many military veterans, Ellis was able to take advantage of the G.I. Bill to pursue an education. He graduated from the Cleveland Art Institute and traveled to Mexico City (1948–1952), where he received his BFA in Art. In Mexico, Ellis produced paintings influenced by the figurative tradition of such artists as Diego Rivera, José Clemente Orozco, and David Alfaro Siqueiros. Although Mexican art and culture would remain a lifelong influence, he broke away from figuration in a series of works that blended the formal characteristics of Cubism and Futurism with the image of a carousel and childhood memories of the medieval armor at the Cleveland Museum of Art.

Moving to the Los Angeles area in the 1950s, Ellis received an MFA from the University of Southern California (1952), where he also taught. From 1956–1964, Ellis served as lllCurator of lllEducation at the Pasadena Art Museum at a time when the museum was playing a pivotal role in established southern California's reputation as a major center for contemporary art. In 1960 and 61, Ellis took a leave of absence to live and paint in Paris. An exhibition of these paintings was presented by the Pasadena Art Museum in fall 1961. During his tenure at the Pasadena Art Museum, in addition to his education work, Ellis also applied his skills to designing all of the museum's graphics. It was during this time at the commercial print shop owned by theosophist Henry Geiger that Ellis developed a love of small presses, typesetting, and cut-and-past layout, influences that would recur in his artwork throughout his career.

In 1964, Ellis moved from southern California to New Mexico to join the art department at the University of New Mexico (UNM), where he served as assistant director of the art museum from 1964 to 1968, and director from 1968 to 1971. Ellis retired from teaching at UNM in 1987 and moved to Taos, New Mexico, with the intention of devoting his time to painting. The following year, however, he was asked to serve as the interim director of UNM's Harwood Museum in Taos, a position that became permanent in 1990, and which he held until his second retirement in 2001.

The years of Ellis's leadership at the Harwood were notable for a major museum expansion completed in 1997, including the addition of the world renown Agnes Martin Gallery. In 1998, in recognition of his contribution to the arts in New Mexico, Ellis received the Governor's Arts Award and the UNM Regents Meritorious Service Award. In 2003 Ellis moved from Taos back to Albuquerque, where he continued to paint and exhibit his artwork. In 2008, Ellis was one of 12 artists honored by the Albuquerque Art Business Association with their annual Local Treasures Award.

== Career ==
=== As an artist ===
A retrospective of Ellis's work from the 1950s through 2009 was presented by 203 Fine Art in Taos (September 12 – October 12, 2009). The earliest works in the exhibition from the 1950s were abstractions. Beginning in the 1960s and continuing through the 1970s, however, the work becomes increasingly representational, often incorporating photographic images and architectural elements such as floorboards. According to an interview in a review of the retrospective, Louise Lewis, professor emeritus of art history at California State University at Northridge, says: “The counterpoint between minimalist and detailed, painted and photographed elements of the image — subtle at first glance and then quite overt — stimulates the viewer to resolve these visual incongruencies.” The review goes on to quote Ellis himself about the next development in his career, the San Cristóbal paintings, done during the 1980s. According to Ellis, these works were inspired when he was teaching a class called "Painting In the Landscape" at the D.H. Lawrence Ranch in Taos: “When I first moved to New Mexico (in 1964) I was so awed by the landscape I couldn’t paint it,” he says, “but, one day, when I looked at the San Cristóbal Valley, the fields became like floorboards — they had that perspective and angle to them. I could see the horizontal and vertical and it got me excited about painting landscapes.”

Two years after his retirement, in 2003, and several months after the death of his beloved wife, Caroline Lee, Ellis embarked on a trip to Greece, a trip they had planned to take together. As Ellis described the experience: “What interested me most was between the columns you could see blue sky or another column in shadow. So, I ended up with paintings with blue and black peeking through, but abstractly arranged”.

Thus began the final chapters in Ellis's artistic career, described by Wilson-Powell in her essay Following the cruise, Ellis began his "Aegean" series of abstractions (2004-2005), in part as a tribute to his late wife and their mutual love of ancient Mediterranean arts and culture. In 2006 he began his "Post-Aegean" series (2006-2010) that breaks free from references to the marble columns of Greek architecture and focuses instead on the relationship of the formal elements of the composition within the rectangular canvass. In 2007 Ellis painted a series of five red, white, and blue striped paintings entitled "Divided Nation". In 2009, a trip to Mitchell Marti's print shop in Santa Fe rekindled Ellis's love of small presses, and he began to produce "Post-Aegean" print portfolios that employ experimental woodblock printing techniques, as well as a series of hybrid works on canvass onto which he glued woodblock print stripes. Towards the end of his life, Ellis would come full circle and had returned to the carousel theme in an unfinished piece he was working on at the time of his death.

=== As a museum curator ===
==== Pasadena Art Museum (1956–1964) ====
Parallel to his career as an artist, Ellis had a distinguished career as an educator and museum professional. In an oral history interview as part of UCLA's Pasadena Art Museum Oral History Project (1990), Ellis discussed his years as the Curator of Education (1956–1964), including the museum's focus on 20th-century art and relationships with local artists and trustees. In addition, he spoke of his own seminal role in developing the Junior Art Workshop, the museum's groundbreaking children's arts education program, his role in designing many of the catalogs for major exhibitions organized by the museum during its halcyon years under the leadership of directors, curators, and board members including Thomas W. Leavitt, Walter Hopps, Robert A. Rowan, and Eudorah Moore, who spearheaded the California Design program (1954–1976), as well as other exhibitions that dissolved the boundaries between art, craft, and industrial design, and were a significant force in establishing California as the international center for contemporary design that it is today.

==== The Harwood Museum (1987–2001) ====
In one of the crowning achievements of his museum career, as director of the Harwood Museum in Taos from 1990–2001, Ellis spearheaded its expansion from a two-room gallery and public library to seven galleries and a world class destination for contemporary art enthusiasts. He was responsible for the acquisition of a collection of seven paintings by the pre-eminent contemporary American artist, Agnes Martin, a longtime Taos resident and Ellis's close friend, and oversaw the construction of the gallery where they are on permanent display. Today, the Agnes Martin Gallery attracts visitors from all over the world and has helped put the Harwood Museum on the map as a major contemporary art destination in New Mexico, on par with The Lightning Field, 1997, the environment installation by artist Walter De Maria. In a review entitled "Worth a Pilgrimage: A journey to the Agnes Martin Gallery in Taos, N.M., offers a stunning, even spiritual, place for viewing contemporary art", (April 12, 1998), Los Angeles Times art critic Christopher Knight gives credit to Ellis for acquiring the gift and creating the gallery.

After the opening of the renovated museum and Agnes Martin Gallery, Ellis embarked on one final push to affirm the place of the Taos art colony in the development of American modernism. From 1999–2000, Ellis and Harwood board president Gus Foster, teamed up on a proposal to the Mandelman-Ribak Foundation that a selection of works by the two artists for whom the foundation was named—Beatrice Mandelman (1912–1998) and Louis Ribak (1902–1979)—be given to the museum's permanent collection along with a gift of funds for a new gallery to be named for them. Ten years in the making, by which time Ellis had retired from the museum and joined the Mandelman-Ribak Foundation board, an agreement was reached between the parties. The multifaceted gift included the transfer of a significant collection of artworks by the two artists, as well as funds for the new gallery, exhibitions and scholarship, and a permanent endowment and plan for care for the artworks. Mandelman] and Ribak were contemporaries of New York artists Willem de Kooning, Arshile Gorky, and Jackson Pollock. They moved from New York to Taos in 1944 and became seminal figures in a group known as the Taos Moderns, that included such artists as Edward Corbett, Andrew Dasburg, Agnes Martin, Oli Sihvonen, Clay Spohn, and Charles Stewart.

Ellis's dedication to arts education carried over from the Pasadena Art Museum Junior Art Workshop to the Harwood's Art in the Schools Program, developed during his tenure as director. Today the program serves over 2,000 children annually through free monthly visits to the museum for grade school students, including opportunities for them to create their own art in the Harwood's Fern Hogue Mitchell Education Center, a children's art studio. In 2010, the Harwood Museum inaugurated the Caroline Lee and Bob Ellis Gallery to honor their dedication to the museum and its education program.

== Personal life ==
Ellis's marriage to Hazel Taylor Ellis in 1948 ended in divorce. In 1958, he married Barbara Shannon Ellis. After that marriage too ended in divorce, Ellis got married for the final time to Caroline Lee, to whom he remained wed until her death in 2003. Ellis died on September 13, 2014, in Albuquerque, New Mexico, at age 92.
