= Mandelman =

Mandelman is a surname and may refer to:

== People ==
- Avner Mandelman, Israeli-Canadian businessman and writer
- Beatrice Mandelman (1912–1998), American abstract artist
- Jack A. Mandelman, American on the List of prolific inventors
- Rafael Mandelman, member of the San Francisco Board of Supervisors

== Other ==
- Mandelman-Ribak Foundation, a nonprofit dedicated to the work of Beatrice Mandelman and Louis Leon Ribak
