= Roger Allen Kotoske =

American artist

- Born: January 4, 1933; South Bend, Indiana
- Died: November 19, 2010 (aged 77) --> Champaign, Illinois
- Education: MFA, University of Denver

Roger Allen Kotoske (1933–2010) was an American sculptor, painter and educator.

== Early life and education ==
Born on January 4, 1933, in South Bend, Indiana, Kotoske was the second son in a German-Italian family of six boys. He received his BFA in 1955 from the University of Denver and then continued his studies in the art department to earn a MFA degree a year later. Kotoske joined the University of Denver faculty as an assistant professor in 1958, at the age of 25. Under the guidance of Vance Kirkland, the Director at the University of Denver art school, Kotoske became a contributing member in the burgeoning Colorado Modernist and Denver avant-garde art scene in the 1950s and 1960s.

== Artistic development ==
In the early 1950s Kotoske experimented with various non-traditional materials. He incorporated fiberglass, wire, metal, bamboo and various woods and other materials into his paintings. By 1963, he was applying polyester resin over the surfaces, developing complex textural and chromatic effects. As Kotoske's paintings became more layered with mixed media they took on sculptural forms. In the early 1960s, Kotoske transitioned from painting to three dimensional forms, and in 1965 he developed a series of large fiberglass wall reliefs and his first free-standing sculpture.

In 1968, Kotoske's work consisted of solid translucent resin in both geometric and biomorphic forms. His work was included in two books on mold making and casting resin. His treatment of light and color related to the works of other sculptors associated with the California Light and Space movement of the 60s and 70s, such as DeWain Valentine, Frederick Eversley, Peter Alexander, Craig Kaufmann, Robert Irwin and Helen Pashgian.

Kotoske developed an allergic response after working with plastics for over a decade, and he returned to painting, this time working in a hard edge geometric style. In the 1970s he created three series, titled “Meet Me On the Square,” “Long Island” and “Alhambra.” The compositions in this body of abstract geometric work followed in the tradition of the California Hard Edge Abstract Classicists, as well as that of painter and lifelong friend, Oli Sihvonen. Kotoske continued exploring the issues of color and form in his paintings over the next thirty years.

== Career achievements ==
In 1967, Kotoske was a panelist for Denver's E.A.T. Symposium. “Experiments in Art and Technology,” which was founded in New York by artists Robert Rauschenberg and Robert Whitman, along with engineers Billy Kluver and Fred Waldhauer, to stimulate collaboration between art and industrial innovation. Kotoske's involvement was a project with Samsonite Corporation, using the company's vacuum-form machinery to create plastic modules that were then assembled into geometric wall reliefs.

In 1968, Kotoske and colleagues Robert Mangold and Wilbert Verhelst organized the Denver Sculpture Symposium, which resulted in the creation of one of the first public sculpture parks in the United States. As part of the Symposium, sculptors Robert Morris, Angelo Di Benedetto, Richard Van Buren, Peter Forakis, Tony Magar and Dean Fleming joined Kotoske, Mangold and Verhelst in creating massive works out of donated materials on a large triangular plot of undeveloped land. Kotoske contributed his largest sculpture to date, entitled “Three Large Diamonds.” Originally meant to be only a temporary exhibition, the sculpture park survives today as Burns Park, with many of the original sculptures restored.

In 1968 an early cast resin work of Kotoske's was included in “The Art of Organic Form” exhibition at the Smithsonian Institution. The show explored relationships between 19th century biological discoveries and 20th century abstract art and featured a large group of artists, including, Paul Klee, Vasily Kandinsky, Arshile Gorky, Herbert Bayer and Takeshi Kawashima.

Kotoske's work in cast resin sculpture was also included in the Potsdam Plastics Exhibition of 1975 at the State University College at Potsdam, New York. Other artists in this exhibition were Arman, John De Andrea, Frederick Eversley, Duane Hanson, and Craig Kaufmann.

At the time of the Potsdam Plastics show Kotoske was represented by the James Yu Gallery, based in the SOHO district of New York City. In the years to follow he exhibited in numerous national museum and gallery exhibitions. During the period of 1981-1987 Kotoske began to exhibit internationally and was included in museum exhibitions in Taiwan, Hong Kong and Beijing.

A resurgence of interest in the Colorado Modernists and the Denver Vanguard movement began to develop in the 1990s. Kotoske was a contributing member of both genres and showed in the following exhibitions: “Reunion,” 1996, Artyard Gallery, Denver; “Vanguard Art in Colorado:1940-1970,” 1999, Boulder Museum of Contemporary Art; and “Colorado Abstract Expressionism,” 2011, Kirkland Museum, Denver.

== Death ==
Kotoske died in Champaign, Illinois on November 19, 2010.

== Selected collections ==
- Kansas City Art Institute, Kansas City, MO
- Nelson–Atkins Museum, Kansas City, MO
- University of Illinois at Urbana-Champaign
- New York University at Oswego, Oswego, NY
- Denver Art Museum, Denver, CO
- City of Denver, Denver, CO
- Franklin Mint, Philadelphia, PA
