= Sean Sullivan (artist) =

American contemporary painter (born 1975)

Sean Sullivan (born 1975, Bronx, New York) is an American artist whose work bridges drawing, printmaking, and painting. Based in the Hudson Valley, New York, Sullivan is known for his meditative, process-driven practice using oil-stick transfer on found paper. His compositions unfold through cycles of subtraction and repetition, foregrounding time, residue, and the devotional discipline of making.

== Early life and education ==
Sean Sullivan was born in 1975 in the Bronx, New York, and lives and works in the Hudson Valley. Largely self-taught, he developed his practice through drawing and print-based experimentation, cultivating a daily discipline of mark-making that continues to anchor his work. Relocating from New York City to the Hudson Valley allowed for a slower, more reflective rhythm of production that informs the measured repetition characteristic of his paintings and drawings.

== Career and work ==
Sullivan’s practice resides between drawing, painting, and printmaking. Process-based and meditative, his works are made through oil-stick transfers on found paper—marks that are pressed, lifted, and re-impressed in cycles of subtraction and repetition. Each image is the residue of accumulated gestures, registering time through the slow layering and removal of pigment. This devotion to process, and the discipline it demands, functions as both method and subject.

Working at an intimate scale, Sullivan favors materials that suggest humility and closeness; the fragility of paper and the modesty of size invite introspection rather than spectacle. His approach is ritualistic yet open to improvisation, a balance he likens to the structure and freedom of free-form jazz. Formally, his work recalls the meditative rigor of Agnes Martin while remaining distinct in its idiosyncratic rhythm and sensitivity to surface.

Sullivan’s drawings and transfers often hover between geometric order and gestural disruption, articulating a dialogue between control and release. Critics have noted how his process “occupies the space between painting, drawing, monoprint, and writing,” a description that underscores his refusal of fixed categories. Although based in the Hudson Valley, Sullivan’s exhibitions with Chris Sharp Gallery in Los Angeles and abroad position him within a broader network of contemporary abstractionists whose work centers on the metaphysics of making.

== Selected solo exhibitions ==
- 2023: Faith in Doubt, Chris Sharp Gallery, Los Angeles, CA.
- 2021: New Mnemonics, Gallery Fifty One / Fifty One Too, Antwerp, Belgium.
- 2020: Elegysome, Feuilleton, Los Angeles, CA.

== Selected group exhibitions ==
- 2024: Hudson Valley Artists 2024: Bibliography, The Dorsky Museum of Art, New Paltz, NY
- 2022: A Minor Constellation, Chris Sharp Gallery, Los Angeles, CA
- 2021: Feeling are Facts, Poker Flats, Williamstown, MA; Hudson House, Hudson, NY.
- 2020: Three Painters, The Arts Center at Duck Creek, East Hampton, NY (with Elliott Green and Eric Banks).
- 2018: Museum for Drawing, Hünningen, Belgium.

== Awards ==
- 2017: NYSCA / NYFA Artist Fellowship in Printmaking, Drawing and Book Arts.
