= Beatrice Mandelman =

American painter (1912–1998)

- Born: December 31, 1912; Newark, New Jersey, U.S.
- Died: June 24, 1998 (aged 85); Taos, New Mexico, U.S.
- Other names: Bea Mandelman, Beatrice Ribak
- Education: Newark School of Fine and Industrial Art; Art Student's League of New York
- Known for: Painting, prints
- Style: abstract
- Movement: Modernism
- Spouse: Louis Leon Ribak (m. 1942; died 1979)

Beatrice Mandelman (December 31, 1912 – June 24, 1998), commonly known as Bea, was an American abstract artist associated with the group known as the Taos Moderns. She was born in Newark, New Jersey to Jewish immigrants who imbued their children with their social justice values and love of the arts. After studying art in New York City and being employed by the Works Progress Administration Federal Arts Project (WPA-FAP), Mandelman arrived in Taos, New Mexico, with her artist husband Louis Leon Ribak in 1944 at the age of 32. Mandelman's oeuvre consisted mainly of paintings, prints, and collages. Much of her work was highly abstract, including her representational pieces such as cityscapes, landscapes, and still lifes. Through the 1940s, her paintings feature richly textured surfaces and a subtly modulated, often subdued color palette. New Mexico landscape and culture had a profound influence on Mandelman's style, influencing it towards a brighter palette, more geometric forms, flatter surfaces, and more crisply defined forms. One critic wrote that the "twin poles" of her work were Cubism and Expressionism. Her work is included in many major public collections, including large holdings at the University of New Mexico Art Museum and Harwood Museum of Art.

== Early life ==
Beatrice Mandelman was born on December 31, 1912, in Newark, New Jersey, to Jewish immigrant parents Anna Lisker Mandelman and Louis Mandelman, who imbued their children with progressive social values and love of the arts. By age 12, Mandelman had begun taking classes at the Newark School of Fine and Industrial Art and determined that she would become an artist. Throughout her formative years, Mandelman developed an enduring international sensibility and absorbed influences from various forms of Modernism. In 1924 artist Louis Lozowick, a family friend, returned from a four year sojourn in Europe and Russia and was an important source of information about Russian Constructivism and other avant garde developments abroad. Mandelman met graphic designer and illustrator Robert Jonas, who introduced her to Willem de Kooning, Arshile Gorky, and other New York vanguard artists.

== Education ==
From 1930–32, Mandelman attended New Jersey College for Women in New Brunswick, part of Rutgers University, and then the Newark School for Fine and Industrial Art, where she studied with Social Realist painter Bernar Gussow. Gussow had studied in Paris at the École des Beaux-Arts and introduced Mandelman to Cubism and the School of Paris. Her plans to study in Paris, however, were interrupted by the death of her father in 1932 and the Great Depression, and it was not until 1948, that Mandelman was able to realize her dream of Paris, where she studied in the studio of Fernand Léger, became friends with Cubist painter Francis Picabia.

== WPA years: 1935–1942 ==
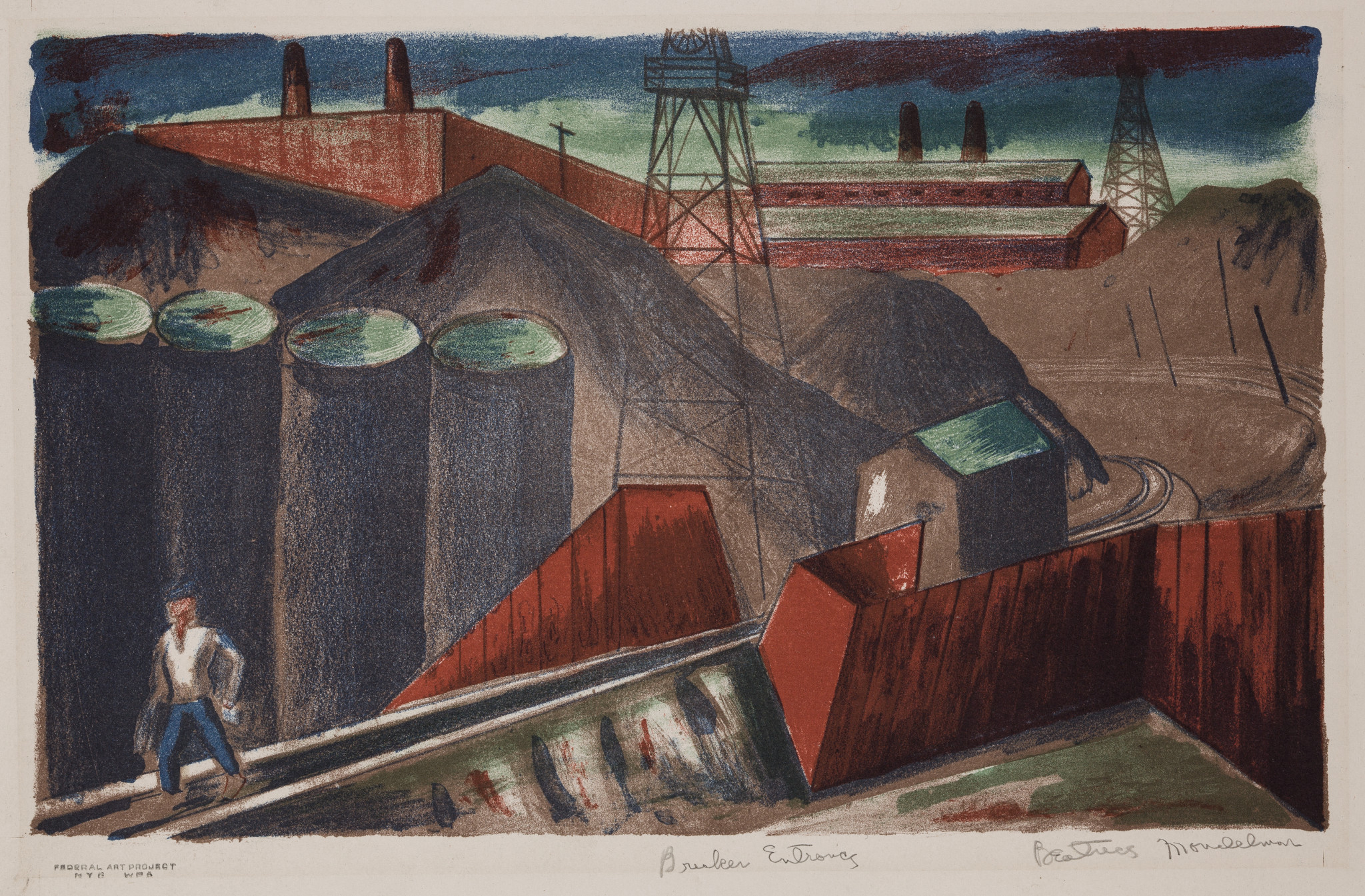
Breaker Entrance, 1939

Between 1935 and 1942, Mandelman was employed the Works Progress Administration's Federal Arts Project (WPA), first as a muralist and later as a printmaker. In 1937-38 she was sent by the WPA to Butte, Montana, to work in the Project Art Center teaching art to children and adults. Upon returning to New York, she resumed her studies at the Art Students League to learn printmaking, and joined the WPA Graphic Arts Division. She became one of the original members of the Silk Screen Unit, who, under the leadership of Anthony Velonis, transformed what had been primarily a commercial medium into an artistic one. Her work in this new medium received an immediate and enthusiastic response. By 1941, her work was associated with the early phase of the New York School, and by the early 1940s her prints began to be acquired by museums and were included in exhibitions at major venues such as the Chicago Art Institute, Museum of Modern Art (New York) and the National Gallery of Art (Washington, D.C.). Mandelman worked for the WPA until 1942, when it was disbanded. Although her style would gradually evolve from Social Realism to abstraction, her works from this period reflect a leftist political bent that continued throughout her life, and would resurface later in a series of collages against the Vietnam War that she created in the 1960s and 70s.

== Taos years ==
Mandelman married fellow artist Louis Ribak in 1942. While still in New York the couple became involved in the early years of the New York School, including vacationing with Jackson Pollock in the summer of 1943, as his career trajectory was taking off. Ribak also became politically active with associates who were under FBI surveillance.

In 1944, Mandelman and her husband visited the artist John Sloan in Santa Fe and traveled up to Taos, which so appealed to them that they impulsively decided to settle there. By the time Mandelman and Ribak arrived, the Taos art colony was already a well-established community of mainly representational artists. Aside from Thomas Benrimo and part-time resident Emil Bisttram there were few local artists working in a Modernist vein, and no local galleries showing Modernist art. Taos offered artists the proximity to Native American culture at Taos Pueblo, spectacular natural surroundings, a low cost of living, and a geographic location that was at the crossroads between the East and West Coasts, and a convenient stopover on the route to and from Mexico. A generation earlier, during the 1920s, it was this same combination of factors that had attracted the New York socialite and arts patron Mabel Dodge Luhan to establish herself in Taos with a salon that attracted many of her day's most important Modernist artistic talents, writers, intellectuals, and activists. She took Mandelman and Ribak under her wing and included them in her book "Taos and Its Artists" (1947).

Mandelman adapted well to life in the Taos art colony. She and Ribak connected with other modern artists settling in Taos in the 1940s and 1950s, such as Edward Corbett and Agnes Martin, and this group became known as the Taos Moderns. In 1947, Mandelman and Ribak founded the Taos Valley Art School, where they taught until it closed in 1953. The school attracted a convergence of New York and San Francisco Bay area artists. Many were World War II veterans taking advantage of the opportunity to study through the G.I. Bill. The school closed in 1953 after losing GI Bill funding. Mandelamn and Ribak decamped for New York where they lived from 1954-56 before returning to their home in Taos.

Her work was included in the 1940 MoMA show American Color Prints Under $10. The show was organized as a vehicle for bringing affordable fine art prints to the general public. Mandelman was also included in the 1947 and 1951 Dallas Museum of Fine Arts exhibitions of the National Serigraph Society.

Far from the strictures of the mainstream art world, Mandelman found the creative freedom to develop her own distinct style, which merged an Abstract Expressionist sensibility with inspiration from the light, color, landscape, and cultures of the American West. Other influences derived from Mandelman's love of adventure. She traveled widely throughout her lifetime, visiting South America, Europe, Asia, and Africa and living for extended periods in Mexico, where she and Ribak would go virtually every year to escape the cold northern New Mexico winters Like many of their contemporaries, including their Santa Fe friend, designer Alexander Girard, they were enamored of folk art and collected it.

== The 1950s: the Taos Moderns ==
During these years the art world was heavily male dominated and the Taos Art Colony was no exception. In the 1950s when fellow abstractionist Agnes Martin arrived on the scene, she and Mandelman became close friends. The friendship between the two women became strained when Martin moved back to New York in 1958, and began her professional ascent. Remaining in Taos, Mandelman was disappointed in the lack of commensurate recognition her own work. Tensions aside, the friendship between Mandelman and Martin resumed in 1992, when Martin returned to Taos, where she lived until her death in 2004.

Mandelman and Ribak's home served as the gathering place for an informal group of artists who began calling themselves the Taos Moderns. Key members of this group included Edward Corbett, Agnes Martin, Oli Sihvonen, and Clay Spohn. Mandelman was included in a 1952 group exhibition "Taos Painting Yesterday and Today" at the Colorado Springs Fine Arts Center. It was the first museum exhibition to address the development of Modernist art in Taos.

By the 1950s, Taos was home to over 200 artists and 18 art galleries. Mandelman and some other local artists organized two artist cooperative galleries, the Ruins Gallery, named in honor of the crumbling adobe that housed it, in 1952, followed by the founding of the Taos Artists' Association and its cooperative, the Stables Gallery. In 1955 Mandelman and Ribak also established Gallery Ribak, occasional public exhibitions in their home, mostly showcasing their own work and that of a few of their friends.

== The 1960s–1980s ==
Mandelman preferred to work in series, a total of 33 starting in the 1940s until her death in 1998. Interspersed were exuberant collages, a medium she first began to explore in the 1950s and continued throughout her career.

After Ribak's death in 1979, Mandelman remained in Taos.

== The 1990s: final years ==
In her final decade, Mandelman continued painting despite debilitating bouts with cancer. In May, 1998, two months before she died, Mandelman was featured in an article in Forbes magazine, which drew international attention and sales. Her spirits buoyed by recognition and sales, and propped up by her caregivers as she painted, Mandelman was able to produce thirty-one works comprising the Winter Series. She died of cancer on June 24, 1998, in her Taos home, at the age of 85.

== Legacy ==
The Mandelman-Ribak Foundation was established to preserve the legacy of Mandelman and her husband. Among other activities it catalogued a half century of their work held in the Mandelman-Ribak Collection. In 2014, the collection and associated personal papers were donated to the University of New Mexico, an endowment for future exhibitions and scholarship, and the naming of the Mandelman-Ribak and Caroline Lee and Bob Ellis Galleries at the UNM Harwood Museum of Art in Taos. The University's Zimmerman Library Center for Southwest Research received the extensive personal papers of both artists, including the notes and poetry written by Mandelman over the years.
