= Carmelita Little Turtle =

Apache/Tarahumara photographer from California (born 1952)

Carmelita "Carm" Little Turtle is an Apache/Tarahumara photographer born in Santa Maria, California, on June 4, 1952. Her hand-painted, sepia-toned photographs explore gender roles, women's rights and the relationships between women and men. Little Turtle's constructed photographic tableaux cast her husband, her relatives, and herself as characters in a variety of Southwestern landscapes that serve as backdrops to the dynamics of interpersonal relationships.

"The iconography in my work, by that I mean the props and costumes, is a private symbolism rather than one imposed by the dominant culture. The symbolism and mythology that dominant society attaches to indigenous people is nothing more than a salve for a troubled collective conscience. I have no need for that kind of mythology and symbolism. I attempt to imply a timelessness in my work which stimulates feelings that represent past, present, and future."

== Life ==
Little Turtle attended the Navajo Community College (now Diné College), graduating in 1978. She also attended the University of New Mexico in Albuquerque, where she studied photography. Additionally, she studied photography at the College of the Redwoods, Eureka, California. She began schooling to become a nurse before deciding to become an artist. She was also known as a producer and photographer with Shenandoah Films in Arcata, California from 1980 to 1983.

Her first exhibition was in 1982 at the Hardwood Foundation in Taos, New Mexico. She has been a part of both individual and group exhibitions. Her first group exhibition was also in 1982. Titled Native Americans Now, it was located at the California Indian Museum and Cultural Center in the Larkfield-Wikiup, also known as Santa Rosa, California. Many of the exhibitions she participated in were based around or about the Native American theme.

Her work is seen in several collections. These include the Center for Creative Photography, Heard Museum, Southwest Museum, Southern Plains Indian Museum, and the Western Arts American Library. She was awarded the Western States Arts Federation Fellowship in 1993.

Lawrence Abbott interviewed her in his 1994 book, I Stand in the Center of the Good: Interviews with Contemporary Native American Artists. Joan M. Jensen also wrote about Little Turtle for a chapter in Susan R. Ressler's Women Artists of the American West (2011), and in her dissertation at the University of New Mexico, "Native American Women Photographers As Storytellers" (2000).

== Individual exhibitions ==
- 1982 – Harwood Foundation, Taos, New Mexico
- 1983 – Southwest Museum, Los Angeles, California
- 1991 – Reflections in Time, American Indian Contemporary Arts, San Francisco, California
- 1992 – Center for Creative Photography, The University of Arizona, Tucson, Arizona
- 2016 – Brandywine Workshop Collection, Arizona State University Art Museum, Tempe, Arizona
