= Samisdat (zine) =

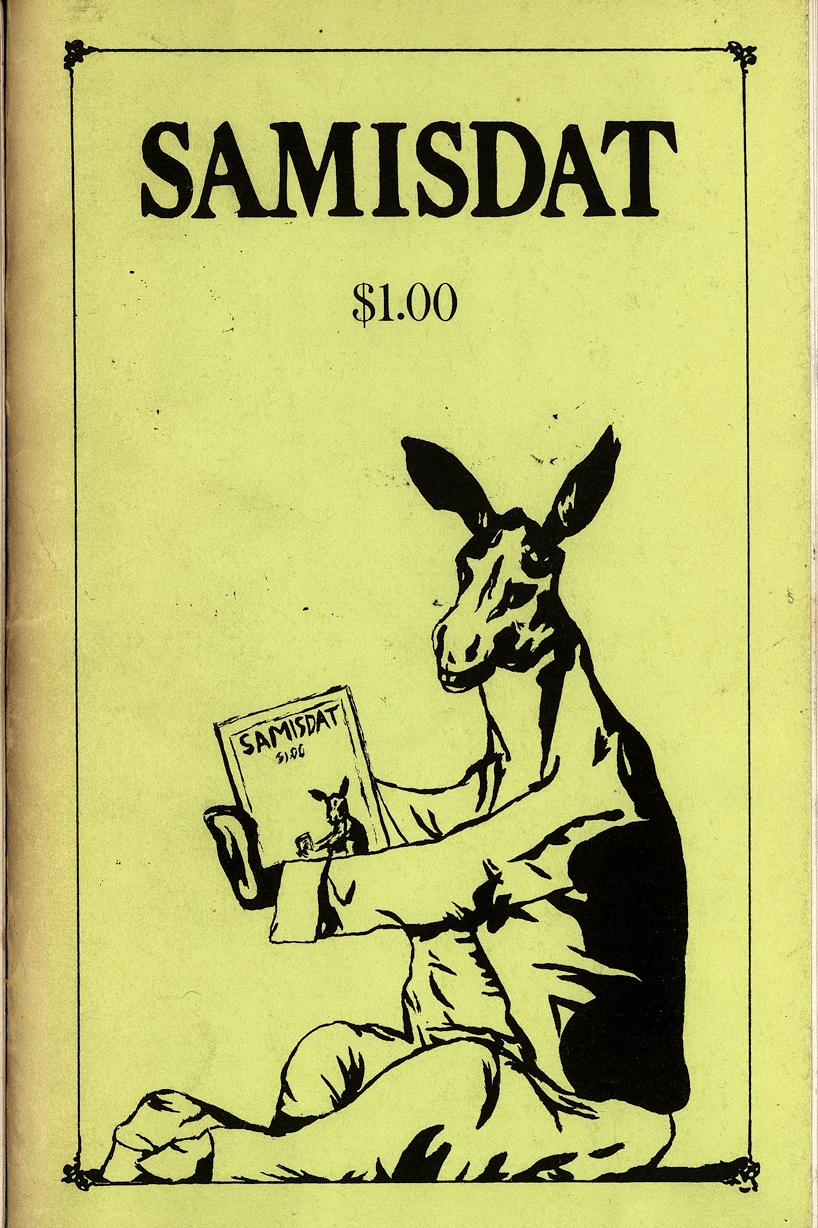
Cover of Samisdat, 1976

Samisdat debuted as The Berkeley Samisdat Review in June 1973 and over a period of two decades published 244 issues. Samisdat was from the beginning an anti-war, anti-establishment, anti-communist, anti-nuclear power, pro-animal, and pro-vegetarian literary magazine. Over 1000 authors appeared in Samisdat, and for some it was their first appearance in print; some of these authors went on to successful careers as authors or poets.

Samisdat was published by self-described "Gandhian anarchist" Merritt Clifton. Clifton and Samisdat were influenced by the Gandhian philosophical newspaper Manas Journal, published by the late Henry Geiger. Like many publications from the Underground Press, it was spurned by print shops because of its content. As a result, the publisher obtained his own offset press which he operated himself.

Clifton eventually published The Samisdat Method which described the practical aspects of purchase and use of an offset press by authors with no background in the printing trade. The book went through several editions and eventually saw publication and distribution by the book trade. It is now out of print.

== See also ==
- Samizdat
