= Samizdat (disambiguation) =

Samizdat is the clandestine copying and distribution of government-suppressed literature or other media in Soviet-bloc countries.

Samizdat may also refer to:

- Samizdat (poetry magazine), a Chicago-based poetry journal
- Samisdat (zine), a 1960s United States zine
- Samisdat Publishers, Holocaust denier Ernst Zündel's publishing house (now defunct)
- Samizdat B92, a Serbian publishing house, part of the B92 radio and TV station
- Samizdat: And Other Issues Regarding the 'Source' of Open Source Code, a controversial book about Linux by Kenneth Brown
- Samizdat (video cartridge), a fictional movie also known as "The Entertainment," in David Foster Wallace's novel Infinite Jest
- Samizdat (Generation Warriors), fictional organization in Anne McCafferey's book Generation Warriors
- Samizdat (Interesting Times), in Terry Pratchett's book Interesting Times
