= Raya Bidshahri =

Educator and entrepreneur

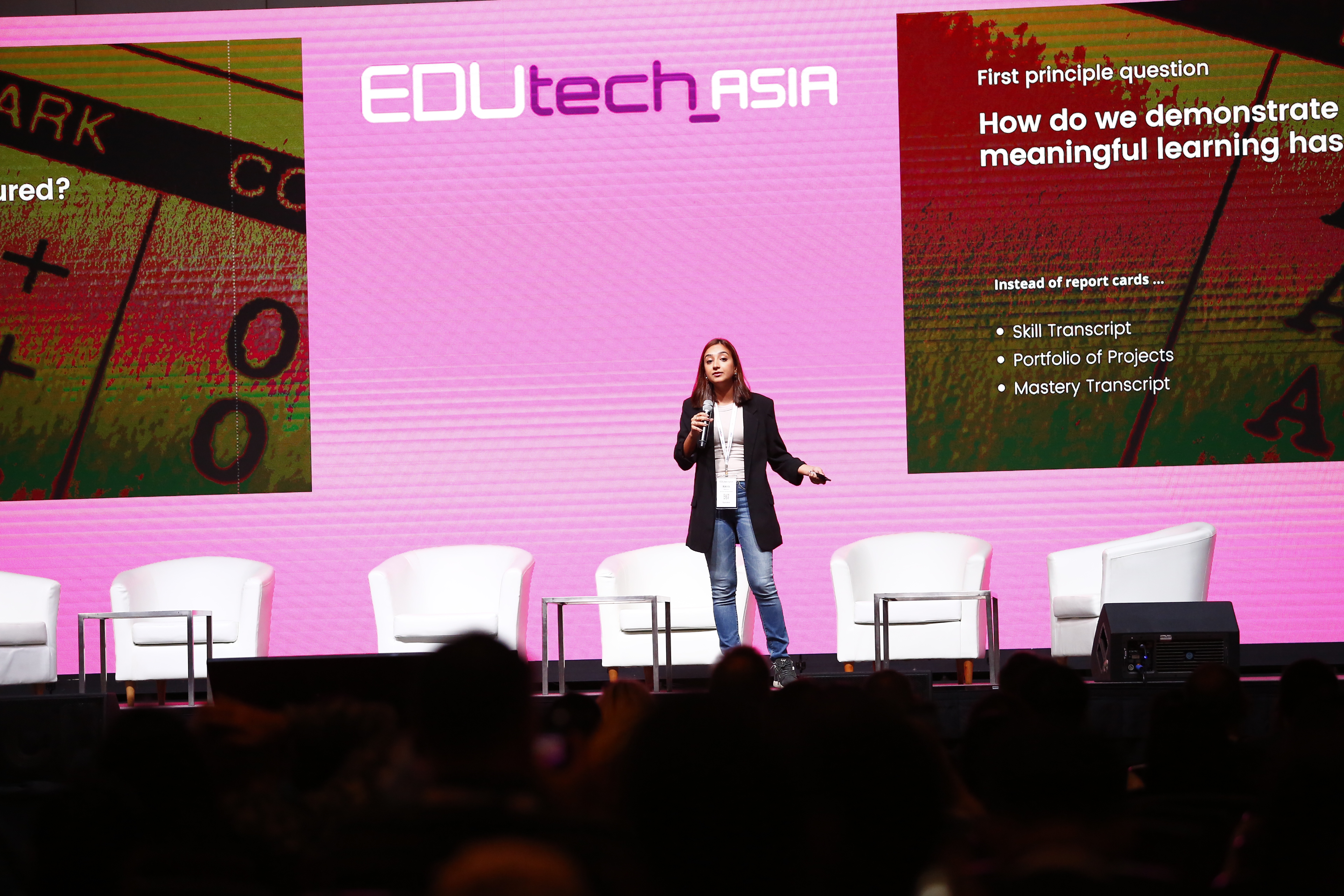
- Raya Bidshahri speaking at the EduTech Asia conference in 2022
- Occupation: Entrepreneur
- Known for: Founder and CEO of School of Humanity
- Website: rayabidshahri.com

Raya Bidshahri (Persian: ريا بيدشهری) is an Iranian educator and serial entrepreneur. She is the Founder and CEO of School of Humanity, an accredited online high school. She was named one of the BBC's 100 Womenfor 2019.

== Career ==
Bidshahri was born in Iran, but grew up in Dubai. There, she was a co-founder of Cafe Scientifique Dubai and a founding member of SciFest Dubai. Bidshahri was also the recipient of the Shaikha Fatima Bint Mubarak Award for Excellence in 2012.

At age 19, she moved alone to the United States to study neuroscience at Boston University, where she also worked with startups like SheWorks! and co-founded a social media platform called Intelligent Optimism. While studying neuroscience, she also worked at Howard Eichenbaum's memory research lab and published bioethics research. When US President Donald Trump signed Executive Order 13780 on March 6, 2017, limiting visas for immigrants from Iran, Bidshahri decided it was too risky to begin a startup in Silicon Valley as she had planned. Instead, after she completed her B.S., she moved to Toronto, Canada in June 2017, and began Awecademy as a Canadian business.

Bidshahri was a regular contributing journalist for the online publication Singularity Hub. She has been a keynote speaker since age 16, and has spoken at various international conferences.

=== School of Humanity ===
In 2021, Bidshahri founded School of Humanity, an accredited online high school with interdisciplinary curriculum, which integrates pedagogies such as challenge-based and mastery-based learning. In June 2022, School of Humanity closed its seed round of funding from Singapore-based Education in Motion.

== Awards and recognition ==
- In 2019, Bidshahri was named one of the BBC's 100 Women.
- In 2020, she won the Joseph Jaworski Main Award at the Next Generation Foresight Practitioners (NGFP) awards.
- In 2024, she was listed on the Forbes 30 under 30 Class of 2025 list, in the education category.
