= Ron Cooper (artist) =

American artist

Ron Cooper (born 1943) is an American artist who grew up in Ojai, California and started his career in the mid 1960s in Los Angeles. By 1973, Cooper had already participated in numerous international solo and group shows with pieces in the permanent collections of the Solomon R. Guggenheim Museum (Guggenheim Museum) and LACMA, and special exhibitions such as that at the La Jolla Museum of Contemporary Art. Cooper is among the pioneering California-based Light and Space artists, who challenged the boundaries of the physical object to experiment with the manipulation of light and space and their effects on perception.

== Art ==
Cooper's art explores Transformative, contemplative experience through light, reflection, transparency, and color, sometimes using the medium of colored fluorescent lights, neon, and glass. In his Separator Variations series the colored fluorescent fixtures, separated by glass, reflect and appear to overlap combining the colors producing a third hue. Most of his pieces, like the Separator Variations series, demonstrate the additive nature of light. His other work includes environmental installations and neon focused on the same themes.

In 2009 Ron Cooper's work was included in a group exhibition at the Harwood Museum of Art in Taos, New Mexico curated by Dennis Hopper called Hopper Curates - Larry Bell, Ron Cooper, Ronald Davis, Ken Price & Robert Dean Stockwell.

== Mezcal ==
Cooper began his work, art, and journey with Mezcal, a rare traditional distilled spirit, in 1972, when he visited the Mexican state of Oaxaca, travelling by VW van on the early Pan-American Highway heading from Los Angeles down to Panama. By 1990 Cooper lived and worked with the Zapotec, Mixtec and Mixe Farmer producers in Oaxaca, and strove to bring Mezcal to his chef and spirit educator friends, and later to the world at large. He founded Del Maguey in the 1995, bringing Mezcal to the awareness of American consumers as a true sipable artisanal spirit or craft ingredient for many creative cocktails. Cooper has done dinner pairings with chefs José Andrés, and Mary Sue Milliken appeared on CNN several times with Anthony Bourdain, and in 2016 Cooper was awarded the James Beard Award for “Outstanding Wine, Beer, or Spirits Professional”.

== Exhibitions ==
- Ron Cooper, An exhibition by the La Jolla Museum of Contemporary Art, La Jolla, California, May 13-July 1, 1973.

== See also ==
- Light sculpture
