= Jaleh Mansoor =

Canadian art historian, critic and academic (born 1975)

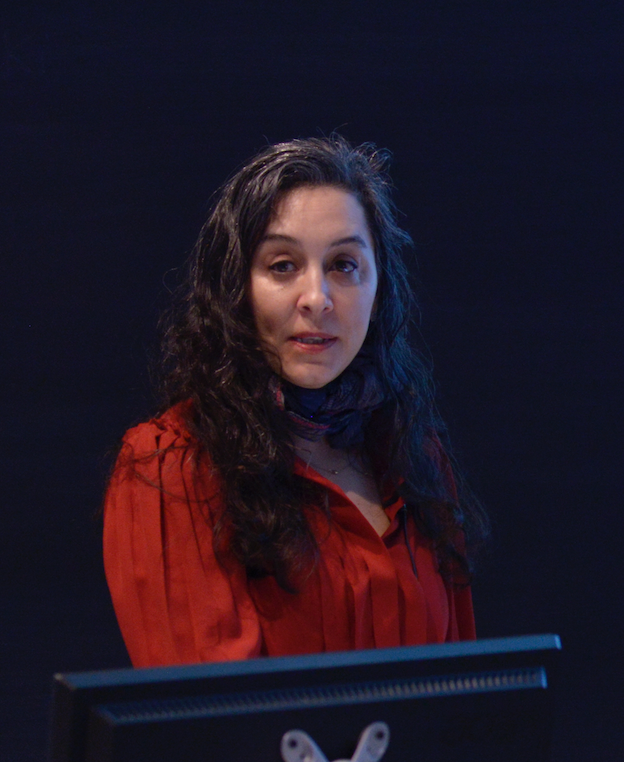
- Born: 1975 (age 50–51); Iran
- Education: B.A. in English and art history from Barnard College in 1997; Department of History of Art and Architecture in Columbia University M.A. in 1999, M. Phil. in 2001 and Ph.D. in 2007
- Known for: Art historian, critic, and theorist of modern and contemporary art

Jaleh Mansoor (born August 18, 1975) is an Iranian-born Canadian art historian, critic, and theorist of modern and contemporary art. She is an associate professor in the faculty of Art History, Visual Art and Theory at the University of British Columbia.

== Education ==
After graduating with a B.A. in English and Art History from Barnard College in 1997, Mansoor attended Columbia University and received her M.A. in 1999, her M.Phil. in 2001 and her Ph.D. in 2007, all in the Department of History of Art and Architecture. While attaining her Ph.D., she studied under the supervision of both Rosalind Krauss and Benjamin Buchloh.

== Career ==
From 2005 to 2011, Mansoor taught at SUNY Purchase, Barnard College, Columbia University, and Ohio University as an assistant professor. Currently she is an associate professor in the Department of Art History, Visual Art and Theory at the University of British Columbia.

=== Research interests ===
Mansoor's area of research includes modern and contemporary art and theory, aesthetic abstraction, modernism, theories of the revolutionary avant-garde, European and American art since 1945, feminist theory, historiography, Marxism, Frankfurt School theory, Autonomia Operaia (Italian Marxism) and critical and curatorial studies. Her teachings at UBC include topics of twentieth-century art, aesthetic abstraction in relation to capitalist abstraction, methodologies, and histories of critical curatorial practice.

=== Critic and author ===
Mansoor has been a critic and contributor to art journals including Artforum, October, Texte Zur Kunst, and The Journal of Aesthetics and Protest. She has authored or co-authored monographic studies on artists including Piero Manzoni, Ed Ruscha, Agnes Martin, Blinky Palermo, Mona Hatoum, Gerhard Richter, and Florian Pumhösl. In 2010, Mansoor co-edited an anthology of essays, Communities of Sense: Rethinking Aesthetics and Politics, addressing the conjuncture between politics and Jacques Rancière’s articulation of aesthetics. The book both argues for a radical potential for equality and heterogeneity within aesthetic fields, but also that these potentials can only be activated by aesthetic strategies. Mansoor has sat as a member on the advisory editorial board since 2013 for The Third Rail, a journal of art, poetics, and politics.

Mansoor's first book Marshall Plan Modernism: Italian Postwar Abstraction and the Beginnings of Autonomia, was published in 2016 by Duke University Press. In Marshall Plan Modernism: Italian Postwar Abstraction and the Beginnings of Autonomia, Mansoor examines the relationship between culture and politics in the 1950s to the 1970s in Italy and theorizes on their influence to the specific branch of modernist painting and art-making that emerged during this time. She suggests that the culture of Italy during the period directly succeeding the Second World War was both symptomatic of and refusing the process of 'Americanization'. Mansoor explores this claim by examining the works of the three Italian artists Piero Manzoni, Alberto Burri, and Lucio Fontana. These artists' practises rejected the nationalist legacy introduced by Italian Futurism by exploring a more collectivist ideology while approaching art production. She applies critical analysis of these artworks using autonomous Marxist theory. Employing the model of capitalist cycles of accumulation by economic theorist Giovanni Arrighi, the book offers a view of history that rejects linear narratives of history and considers a more cyclical and repetitive notion of re-emergence, exemplified by the reappearance of form as seen in the works of Burri, Fontana, and Manzoni. In addition, each chapter elaborates upon how the works of these three artists assisted in the different stages of development of capital in Italy. The title of the book is derived from the Marshall Plan. The title suggests that the development of the Italian state is a product of this economic aid, which also greatly influenced Italian art production.

== Bibliography ==
=== Books ===
- Marshall Plan Modernism: Italian Postwar Abstraction and the Beginnings of Autonomia. Duke University Press, 2016

==== Chapters ====
- “Making Human Junk.” In Sensible Politics: The Visual Culture of Nongovernmental Activism (edited by Meg McLagan and Yates McKee), pp. 81–94. New York: Zone Books, 2012
- “Representation.” In Keywords for Radicals (edited by Kelly Fritsch and Clare O’Connor), pp. 351 – 357. London and San Francisco: AK Press, 2016
- “The Hidden Abode Beyond/Beneath/Behind the Factory Floor, Gendered Labour, and The Human Strike: Claire Fontaine’s Italian Marxist Feminist Politics.” In Companion to Feminist Art Practice and Theory (edited by Maria Elena Buszek and Hilary Robinson). New York: Wiley-Blackwell, 2019

=== Articles ===
- “Material Value: On Piero Manzoni at Gagosian.”, pp. 89-90. Artforum, May 2009
- “A Spectral Universality: Mona Hatoum’s Biopolitics of Abstraction.”, pp. 49 – 74. October, no. 133, Summer 2010
- “Poetics, Commitment: Ayreen Anastas’s M*Bethlehem and Pasolini Pa Palestine.”, pp. 55 – 79. Journal of Aesthetics and Protest no. 8, Fall 2011
- “Opacity, Transparency, Monochrome: Notes on Form and Historicity.”, pp. 43–48. The Third Rail issue 2, Winter 2014
- “Unveiling and / or Re-masking: Notes on the Political Dialectics of the Opacity of the Sign.”, pp. 70 – 81. Texte zur Kunst no. 106, Summer 2017

=== Reviews ===
- “Missed Encounters.” Review of Rosalyn Deutsche, Hiroshima After Iraq. In Art Journal, vol. 70, no. 3., Fall 2011, pp. 106–109
- Review of T.J. Demos, The Migrant Image: The Art and Politics of Documentary during Global Crisis. In Middle East Journal of Culture and Communication, 7, no. 2., Spring 2014, pp. 243–47
- Review of Anthony White, Lucio Fontana: Between Utopia and Kitsch. In College Art Association Reviews, December 2013, pp. 1 –3
