= Fountain of Light =

- Fountain of Light #12, April 1, 1970
- Type: Underground press monthly
- Format: Tabloid
- Founded: 1968
- Ceased publication: 1970
- Headquarters: Taos, New Mexico

Fountain of Light was a hippie underground newspaper of the 1960s, published monthly in tabloid format in Taos, New Mexico, from 1969 to 1970. At least 14 issues were published before the paper ceased publication in June 1970.

== History ==
Members of The Family and Lorien communes outside Taos launched the paper in the Lorien Building, a converted warehouse north of town on the Santa Fe Trail. Timothy Miller, in The Sixties Communes: Hippies and Beyond gives the following brief account of the origins:

"Seeing a need for services to the hippies who were descending on Taos in droves, The Family prevailed upon a wealthy local counterculturalist—one of the young heirs who played such vital roles in sponsoring communes—to underwrite a natural foods general store, a free medical clinic, an alternative newspaper called the Fountain of Light, and a sort of hippie switchboard, the Taos Community Information Center. The group also ran an alternative school. These enterprises never produced much income, however."

In addition to the services Miller mentions, there were also a bookstore, a mobile security patrol, a small research library, and a shortwave radio network connecting some of the outlying communes without phone service. Along with most of the rest of these facilities, Fountain of Light perished when the money ran out in 1970, with all of the above-mentioned services having collectively exhausted $250,000 in two years.

A small part of the paper's spirit might be gathered from a 1969 editorial entitled, "Why Taos":

"While it may be said we are fleeing the deplorable conditions of contamination of the urban areas, both physical and spiritual, the real motivation seems to be a quest for a more natural way of life. Away from the plastic and putrefying conditions in the cities. We mean to establish for ourselves new life styles that are basically simple and agrarian. Our concern is with the real—real food grown by ourselves for the most part, real and useful products produced by heads and hands and hearts, expressions in art forms that manifest individual energies of human beings rather than the faceless and soulless work of mechanized existence. To plant and cultivate and to ultimately harvest worthwhile things from joyous labors, this is what we are about."

Concluding,

"We are not reformers and do not seek directly to influence social or political order, but only to be unmolested and live our lives in peace and let those lives speak for themselves."

== Contributors ==
In the paper's final months of existence, local writer Jim Levy took over as editor and attempted to transition it from a hippie commune paper to a local alternative newspaper covering actual news for the broader Taos community. This involved abandoning psychedelic design motifs in favor of a more traditional newspaper look. Contributors included local poet, Harvey Mudd, and Rodger Thomas served as the paper's graphic designer. Phaedra Greenwood contributed many articles relevant to the community, such as the proposed "Earth People's Park," the Hog Farm in Penãsco, and a plea for the return of Taos Pueblo's sacred Blue Lake . The 14th issue, dated June 1, 1970, featured excerpts from From Bindu to Ojas, the earliest form of Be Here Now by Baba Ram Dass, who was at that time in residence at the Lama Foundation, 17 miles north of Taos.

== See also ==
- List of underground newspapers of the 1960s counterculture
