= Jim Levy (author) =

American writer

Norman James "Jim" Levy (born October 6, 1940) is an American writer who has published eighteen books of poetry, essays, memoirs, travel and fiction. In his professional life, he worked for forty years as an executive and as a consultant to nonprofits organizations.

== Early life ==
Levy was born in Chicago, Illinois, on October 6, 1940. His father was Norman Arnold Levy, a Freudian psychoanalyst, and his mother was Caroline S. Levy, a wife, mother and aspiring writer. The family moved to Los Angeles when Jim was five. He attended public elementary and Jr. High, and then The Thacher School in Ojai, California. After two years at Pomona College, he spent nine months writing in Italy and Spain, then enrolled in the University of California, Berkeley, where he earned a bachelor's degree in English and a lifetime teaching credential in secondary education.

== Professional career ==
Levy was the executive director at the Harwood Foundation of the University of New Mexico, at the Taos Art Association in Taos, New Mexico, and at Family Services Center in San Luis Obispo, California. He was the manager of Diversified Properties at the Housing Authority of the city of Boulder, Colorado. As a consultant he specialized in short-term rescue operations and in obtaining 501(c)(3) nonprofit status for new nonprofits. Levy was also the editor of the counterculture magazine Fountain of Light and a frequent book reviewer for the Taos News and The Santa Fe New Mexican.

== Bibliography ==
=== Nonfiction ===
- Corazon (and Merkle). Atalaya Press. 2014.
- The Wind is Rising, Atalaya Press. 2022.
- The Snows of Yesterday. Atalaya Press. 2024.
- They Too Have Souls. Atalaya Press. 2025.

=== Poetry ===
- Cooler Than October Sunlight. Atalaya Press. 2015.
- The Poems of Caius Herennius Felix. The Porcupine Press. 2015.
- Monet's Eyes. Cedar Forge Press. 2018.
- Seen from a Distance. Cedar Forge Press. 2019.
- Of All the Stars, the Evening Star. Atalaya Press. 2020.
- Bacchus and the Drinker. Atalaya Press. 2021.

=== Essays ===
- Joy to Come. Porcupine Press. 2016.
- Chekhov's Mistress. Atalaya Press. 2020.
- The Existential Pig. Atalaya Press. 2021

=== Memoirs ===
- The Fifth Season. Atalaya Press. 2016.
- Rowdy's Boy. Atalaya Press. 2016.
- Those Were the Days. With Phaedra Greenwood. Atalaya Press. 2019.

=== Travel ===
- Mar Egeo. Stories and tales of travel. Atalaya Press. 2017.

=== Fiction ===
- The District. Atalaya Press. 2023.

== Awards ==
- Those Were the Days. Best regional books of 2019, Taos News.
- Poets Spotlighted, The Hypertexts.com. 2022

== Personal life ==
Levy met Deirdre Bull in 1962 and they lived together, along with her two children Arlyn and Edward until 1971. They were married in 1966 and divorced in 1974. Deirdre went on to become a Buddhist nun. She is now called Pema Chödrön and has written a series of bestselling books and audios. Levy and author Phaedra Greenwood lived together from 1972 to 1992 and were married in 1977. They were divorced in 1994 and reunited in 2003. They live in Arroyo Hondo, New Mexico.
