= Gabriel (1976 film) =

Gabriel (1976) is the only film by the Canadian-American painter Agnes Martin. It is 78 minutes in length, and features a little boy going for a walk in a natural landscape.

== Outline ==
The film opens with a shot of a mountain, and then shows waves lapping at the shore. A little boy, the eponymous Gabriel, is shown standing with his back to the camera, looking out to sea. He wears shorts, a white T-shirt and a pair of brown hiking boots. In the next shot, he sits on a rock looking out at the ocean: this shot has an intense red filter over it. Naturalistic color returns, and the film then follows Gabriel on a walk, as he traverses first a riverside path, then a mountain path. In the middle section of the film, the boy does not feature at all: for about twenty minutes the film consists only of close-up shots of flowers and water. At about fifty minutes through the film, Gabriel appears again, walking through sparse woodland. A sequence of close up shots of birch trees follows. The final minutes of the film intercut Gabriel's walk with flower and water shots. He finishes his walk sitting on a hill, looking out at the view. The film ends with a shot of a rock in the sea with waves swelling over it.

All the shots are handheld. The film is silent, apart from seven moments at which excerpts from Bach's Goldberg Variations come in for two or three minutes at a time.

== Production ==
=== Filming ===
Gabriel was shot on 16mm color film using an Arri Arriflex camera. Martin filmed over the course of three to five months and used no script and no storyboards.

=== Cast ===
The boy was played by Peter Mayne, who was from Cuba, New Mexico (where Martin lived at the time). Martin referred to Mayne as ‘a little hippie boy’ and noted that though he looks about ten years old, he was in fact fourteen.

=== Locations ===
Gabriel was filmed in various locations in the American Southwest, including California, Colorado and New Mexico. The scholar Matthew Jeffrey Abrams suggests that the mountain that appears in the opening shots of the film might be the Wheeler Peak in the Sangre de Cristo Mountains.

== Artistic intent ==
Martin said she wanted to make a film ‘about happiness and innocence. I’ve never seen a movie or read a story that was absolutely free of any misery. And so, I thought I would make one. The whole thing is about a little boy who has a day of freedom, in which he feels free.’

She also said that she made the film ‘in protest against commercial movies that are about destruction, deceit. They’ve sold out to the special effects. It’s just a series of physical shocks to go to the movies’. Arne Glimcher, Martin's friend and gallerist, notes that Martin originally wished the film to be distributed through commercial Hollywood channels, though she did not achieve this aim.

On the title of the film, the artist noted that she chose an angel's name to represent innocence.

== Public screenings ==
Gabriel premiered at the Museum of Fine Arts, New Mexico, USA (1977). This was shortly followed by a screening at the Institute of Contemporary Art, Philadelphia, USA (April 1977) and at the Anthology Film Archives, New York, USA (14 May 1977). Rosalind Krauss saw the film when it screened at White Columns, New York, USA (1982).

More recently, the film has been screened in Edinburgh, UK (1999); at Kettle's Yard, Cambridge, UK (June 2010); at the Museum of Modern Art, New York, USA (28 October 2011); at DIM Cinema, Vancouver, Canada (16 April 2012); at Anthology Film Archives, New York, USA (2013); at Tate Modern, London, UK (5 June 2015); at Experimental Film Club, Dublin, Republic of Ireland (28 July 2015); and at Summerhall, Edinburgh, UK (20 January 2016); at the Solomon R. Guggenheim Museum, New York, USA (21 October, 18 November, 16 December 2016); at Art Cinema OFFoff, Ghent, Belgium (7 October 2019); at the Roxie Theater, San Francisco, California, USA (18 February 2020).

== Critical reception and scholarship ==
Gabriel has had a mixed reception, and has often been seen as an anomaly in Agnes Martin's oeuvre. After the film was screened at the Anthology Film Archives in New York, the filmmaker Jonas Mekas reviewed it in his ‘Movie Journal’ column in the SoHo Weekly News. He wrote that, ‘Agnes Martin is a great painter and whatever she does has an importance. Her film is no great cinema, that I have to state at the outset. But it is a very beautiful film. [...] Agnes Martin's film is about water, about countryside, flowers, nature, and mystery.'

The art critic Rosalind Krauss wrote about the film in her essay for the catalogue of the 1993 retrospective of Agnes Martin’s work (at the Whitney Museum of American Art, New York). She writes that ‘It is not a work Martin herself gives any indication of wanting to bracket away from the rest of her art. Yet it should be. For Gabriel constructs a reading of Martin’s own work as crypto-landscape, a reading that, since it is produced by the artist herself, tends to carry the weight of interpretative proof.’

Arne Glimcher commented: 'It is not unlike a Warhol movie. It is incredibly boring. It's, like, two hours long, and after about twenty, thirty minutes you start to get into it. At the beginning the movie can be excruciating and then you realise what she's doing. It's almost like a sensory deprivation experiment, then everything you start to see becomes heightened because you're so hungry for some activity. [...] At the same time in the scientific world we were dealing with sensory deprivation experiments, where people were being put in chambers and their perceptual systems would begin to fire on their own. And I think Warhol was doing that and I think frankly some of Agnes's paintings do that.'

== Restoration ==
Gabriel was restored by the Museum of Modern Art (New York) and Pace Gallery in 2011.
