= Harwood Museum of Art =

Art museum in Taos, New Mexico, US

Coordinates: 36°24′21″N 105°34′38″W

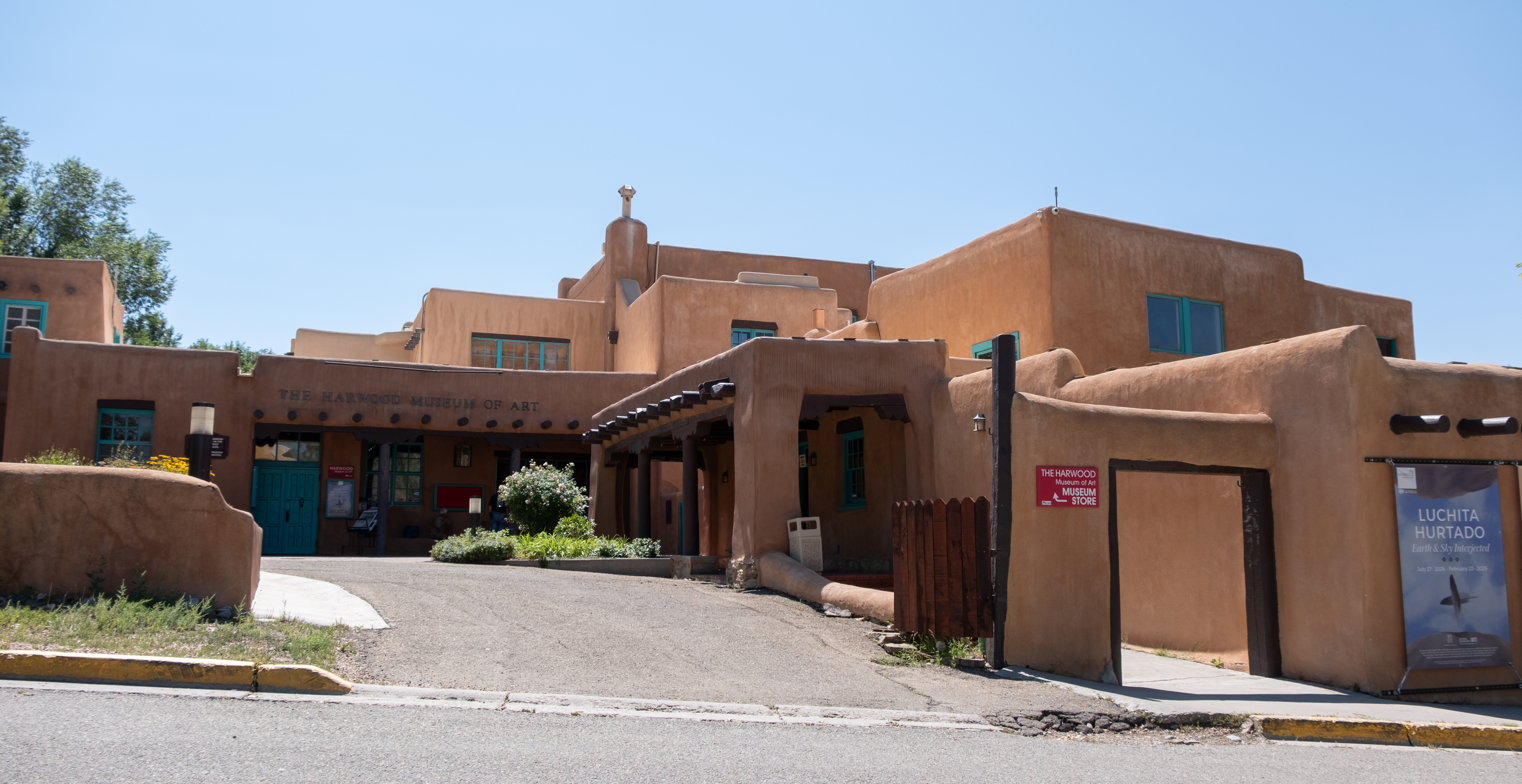
The Harwood Museum of Art

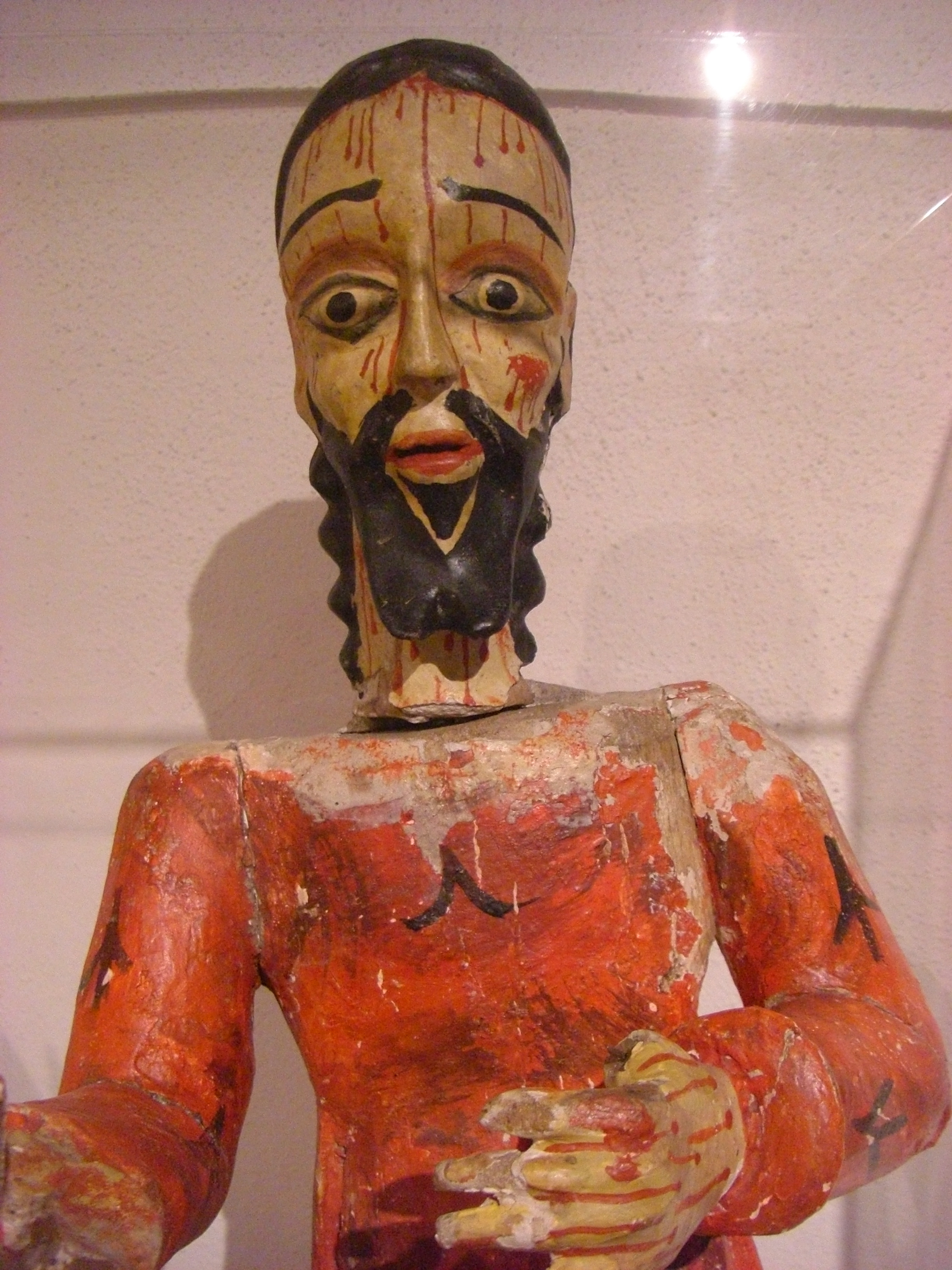
Spanish colonial bulto, Harwood Museum of Art, Taos

The Harwood Museum of Art is located in Taos, New Mexico. Founded in 1923 by the Harwood Foundation, it is the second oldest art museum in New Mexico. Its collections include a wide range of Hispanic works and visual arts from the Taos Society of Artists, Taos Moderns, and contemporary artists. In 1935 the museum was purchased by the University of New Mexico. Since then the property has been expanded to include an auditorium, library and additional exhibition space.

== Collections ==
The Harwood Museum of Art in Taos has a permanent collection of over 1,700 works of art and 17,000 photographic images. The collection dates from the 19th century to the present and reflects the multicultural heritages and influences of the Taos artistic community. The categories of works include: Hispanic, Taos Society of Artists, Taos Moderns, Contemporary, and Prints, Drawings and Photographs.

=== Hispanic collection ===
The Harwood Museum has a collection of a broad range of Hispanic works, including paintings, tinware and woodworking reflecting craftsmanship going back to the beginning of Spanish colonization of New Mexico.

==== Woodworking ====
Too expensive to have furniture shipped from Mexico City, New Mexicans established carpentry shops in late 18th century and early 19th century where carved furniture was made, such as cajas (storage chests), harineros (grain chests), and trasteros (kitchen cupboards). The Valdez workshop in Taos County created works distinguished by incised asterisk markings; Some works were brightly colored in red and blue.

==== Tin work ====
Tin work served as an integral part of Hispanic religious culture during the 19th century. Tin cans, glass panes and religious prints were fashioned into devotional objects. There were 13 workshops in New Mexico from 1840 to 1915 thirteen workshops in New Mexico. By the turn of the century tinsmiths primarily created items for the home, such as sconces, lanterns and trinket boxes.

==== Santos ====
Santos, sacred images of Roman Catholicism for homes and churches, were made in New Mexico since the late 1700s. The museum's collection includes works donated by Mabel Dodge Luhan made between 1800 and 1850 and contemporary works. The Harwood has the largest publicly owned collection of secular works by Patrociño Barela (1900–1964), an acclaimed leader for contemporary santeros. Some of the museum's pieces include carvings show at a premier at Museum of Modern Art in New York.

==== Spanish Colonial revival ====
During the 1920s and 1930s there was Spanish Colonial revival reflected in many forms of art, including furniture, tinware, architecture and colcha embroidery. State and Federal government and private foundations funded programs to hire instructors to teach craftsmanship. The New Deal's Taos Crafts smithing and furniture school resulted in pieces made in wood and tin, such as tin work chandeliers, armarios (cabinets), bancos (benches), mesas (tables) and sillas (chairs) that are used in the gallery or offices of the Harwood.

=== Taos Society of Artists ===
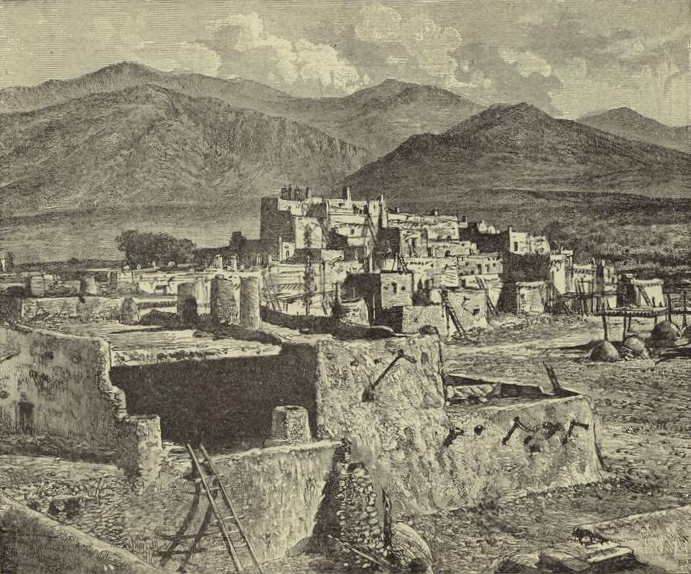
Joseph Henry Sharp, Taos Pueblo, 1893 illustration for Harper's Weekly

The Taos Society of Artists, inspired by the Taos Pueblo people and the Taos landscape, was formed in 1915 by European trained artists Joseph Henry Sharp, Bert Geer Phillips, Ernest L. Blumenschein, Oscar E. Berninghaus, E. Irving Couse and W. Herbert Dunton. They wanted an organization like the Barbizon School of artists who painted landscapes in the Barbizon region of France. The Taos Society of Artists coordinated traveling shows of society members' works throughout the United States. Their work was generally of Native Americans, Hispanics and early Anglo-Americans settlers and landscapes. The organization disbanded in 1927.

=== Taos Moderns ===
Ad Reinhardt painting

In the 1940s a group of artists, some able to study under the G.I. bill, came to Taos with influences from European and American modern art. Without knowing the history of the local art colony, artists came from New York City and San Francisco, centers for abstract painting that emerged after World War II. By the 1950s Taos had become one of the major centers for modern art in the country. The artists became known as the "Taos Moderns". Andrew Dasbug came to Taos and was a mentor to many of the new artists. Some of the emerging artists from this period include: Thomas Benrimo, Agnes Martin, Clay Spohn, and Edward Corbett. Other visiting artists include Richard Diebenkorn, Mark Rothko, Ad Reinhardt, Clyfford Still, and Morris Graves.

Like earlier artists, they portrayed the colorful New Mexican landscape and cultural influences, such as the "timelessness they perceived in Puebloan culture and the deep connection to the land they noted in the everyday life of both Native Americans and Hispanics influence experimentation and innovation in their own art." Rather than capturing realist images of people and the landscape, they sought to capture the true meaning of their subjects.

=== Contemporary ===
The 1960s and 1970s was a transitional period for the Taos art colony. People who had been guiding forces of the art colony died, such as Mabel Dodge Luhan, Andrew Dasburg, Emil Bisttram, and Dorothy Brett. There was also an influx of a new generation of artists when Dennis Hopper came to Taos to complete final rough cut of "Easy Rider". He stayed and bought the Mabel Dodge Luhan property and, like her, encouraged artists, musicians and celebrities to visit him in Taos. Contemporary artists such as Ronald Davis, Dennis Hopper, Kenneth Price, Larry Bell, Ron Cooper, Gus Foster, Lee Mullican, Larry Calcagno and R. C. Gorman came to Taos; Some moved to Taos permanently and others spent part of each year in Taos.

Price's project known as Happy's Curios was shown at the Los Angeles County Museum of Art. The Harwood Museum has one of the larger pieces, "Death Shrine 1" from that collection on extended loan. Harwood's collection include a retrospective of 18-20 works by Larry Calcagno and R. C. Ellis. Taos is a second home for artists from the east and west coasts, continuing Taos art colony's international reputation.

In 2009 the Harwood Museum held a group exhibition curated by Dennis Hopper called Hopper Curates - Larry Bell, Ron Cooper, Ronald Davis, Kenneth Price & Robert Dean Stockwell .

=== Prints, drawings and photographs ===
The Harwood Museum of Art displays works from their permanent collection of prints, drawings and photographs and works on loan. The museum collection includes works of early artists, such as Howard Cook, Joseph Imhoff, Gene Kloss, Nicolai Fechin, and Walter Ufer. Imhoff first brought a lithography press to Taos. The works of the works of Tom Benrimo, Andrew Dasburg, Earl Stroh, and Louis Leon Ribak represent the Taos Moderns. The collection also has prints and drawings from more recent artists, such as Larry Calcagno, R.C. Ellis, Kenneth Price, Joe Waldrum, Vija Celmins, Wes Mills, and Bill Gersh.

The collection includes more than 17,000 photographic images of Taos art and artists, Hispanic villages and Indian Pueblos.

== History ==
Burt and Elizabeth Harwood left their home in France in 1916 to move to Taos where they purchased a cluster of small adobe buildings on Ledoux Street. Over the next three years Burt Harwood directed the remodeling of the buildings, in keeping with local construction techniques, and named the complex "El Pueblito".

When the Harwoods realized there was no town library in Taos they opened their extensive private library to the public. Mabel Dodge Luhan supported their efforts through book and financial donations. Often exhibitions of pottery, textiles, wood sculptures and santos were displayed at Harwood; The museum, founded in 1923, is the second oldest art museum in the state.

In 1929 the University of New Mexico opened a Field School of Art at Harwood. The Harwood Foundation was given to the University of New Mexico in 1935 and became a source of programs for the university in Taos County, New Mexico. It was expanded in 1937 as designed by John Gaw Meem to include an auditorium, stage, exhibition space, and a library facility.

In 1997 the Harwood Museum opened another major renovation and expansion, including the Agnes Martin Gallery to house seven paintings donated by the artist to the museum. The gift of the paintings, and the design of the octagonal space to the artist's specifications by Albuquerque architectural firm, Kells & Craig, were negotiated and overseen by museum director Robert M. Ellis, a close friend of Martin's. The Agnes Martin Gallery attracts visitors from all over the world and has been compared by scholars to the Chapelle du Rosaire de Vence (Matisse Chapel), Corbusier's Chapel of Notre Dame du Haut in Ronchamp, and the Rothko Chapel in Houston.

== See also ==
- Harwood Foundation
- Millicent Rogers Museum
- Taos Art Museum
