= Challenge-based learning =

Form of learning by problem solving

Challenge-based learning (CBL) is a framework for learning while solving real-world challenges. The framework is collaborative and hands-on, asking all participants (students, teachers, families, and community members) to identify big Ideas, ask good questions, discover and solve challenges, gain in-depth subject area knowledge, develop 21st-century skills, and share their thoughts with the world.

Challenge-based learning builds on the foundation of experiential learning, leans heavily on the wisdom of a long history of progressive education, shares many of the goals of service learning, and the activism of critical pedagogy. The framework is informed by innovative ideas from education, media, technology, entertainment, recreation, the workplace, and society.

== History ==
The Challenge Based Learning framework emerged from the "Apple Classrooms of Tomorrow - Today" (ACOT2) project initiated in 2008 by Apple, Inc. to identify the essential design principles of a 21st-century learning environment (Apple Inc., 2008). Starting with the ACOT2 design principles, a team from Apple, Inc. worked with exemplary educators to develop, test and implement challenge-based learning.

Using Challenges to frame learning experiences originated from an exploration of reality television, conversations with individuals whose lives center on Challenges, and reflection on personal learning experiences inside and outside of the classroom. When faced with a Challenge, successful groups and individuals leverage experience, harness internal and external resources, develop a plan and push forward to find the best solution. Along the way, there is experimentation, failure, success and ultimately consequences for actions. By adding Challenges to learning environments the result is urgency, passion, and ownership – ingredients often missing in schools.

The initial framework was documented in a white paper written in 2008 and published by Apple, Inc (Nichols and Cator, 2009). Since that time teachers and schools around the world have adopted the framework to improve teaching and learning while allowing students to make an immediate difference in their community.

In 2009 New Media Consortium published an in-depth study of challenge-based learning in classroom practice. The study, which involved 6 schools in the United States, 29 teachers, and 330 students in 17 disciplines, found the approach produced dramatically effective results, especially for the 9th-grade students considered to be most at risk of dropping out (Johnson, et al., 2009).

In 2011 an additional study was conducted to test if the framework applied to a larger K-20 audience and to look deeper into the acquisition of 21st century skills. This study includes 19 schools, 90 teachers and 1500 students from three countries. Once again the research demonstrated that CBL is an effective way to engage students, meet curriculum standards, and gain 21st-century skills. The research also concluded that CBL could be used with students of all ages (Johnson and Adams, 2011).

In 2016 Apple Inc. engaged Digital Promise, and members of the team that created CBL to update the content, manage the website and develop a book (Nichols, et al., 2016).

The updated framework in organized into three phases:

- Engage – Through a process of Essential Questioning, the Learners move from an abstract Big Idea to a concrete and actionable Challenge.
- Investigate – All Learners plan and participate in a journey that builds the foundation for Solutions and addresses academic requirements.
- Act – Evidence-based Solutions are developed, implemented with an authentic audience, and then evaluated based on the results.

Throughout the process, all participants are expected to document the experience, reflect on practice and share the experience with the world.

The CBL framework has been extended into new areas including strategic planning, workplace training (O'Mahony, et al., 2012), and mobile software instruction and development (Santos, et al., 2015).

== Principles ==
Challenge-based learning is a flexible framework, with each implementation, new ideas surface, the framework is reviewed, and the model evolves.

Challenge-based learning provides:

1. A flexible and customizable framework that can be implemented as a guiding pedagogy or integrated with other progressive approaches to learning.
2. A scalable model with multiple points of entry and the ability to start small and build big.
3. A free and open system with no proprietary ideas, products or subscriptions.
4. A process that places all Learners in charge, and responsible for the learning.
5. An authentic environment for meeting academic standards and making deeper connections with content.
6. A focus on global ideas, meaningful Challenges and the development of local and age appropriate solutions.
7. An authentic relationship between academic disciplines and real world experience.
8. A framework to develop 21st-century skills.
9. Purposeful use of technology for researching, analyzing, organizing, collaborating, networking, communicating, publishing and reflecting.
10. The opportunity for Learners to make a difference now.
11. A way to document and assess both the learning process and products.
12. An environment for deep reflection on teaching and learning.

== See also ==
- Learning by teaching
- Pedagogy
