= Joan Potter Loveless =

American weaver and writer (b. 1928, d. 2009)

Joan Potter Loveless (July 8, 1928 – May 10, 2009) was an American weaver and writer.

== Biography ==
Joan Potter Loveless was born on July 8, 1928, as Joan Couch. She studied weaving under Anni Albers at Black Mountain College in North Carolina from 1944 to 1948. In 1946, she married painting student Oli Sihvonen and the couple had a daughter, Kimry, in 1947. After the 1948 session, the family traveled to Taos, New Mexico, where Oli was studying. After moving to Washington, D.C., Loveless began teaching kindergarten and created curriculum for students who were moving from preschool to formal schooling based on observation, projects using the body, recording and discussions.

In 1956, she returned to Taos where Loveless began weaving tapestry from homespun and hand-dyed wools. Her weavings adapted to the Southwest and she drew inspiration from the landscape and Navajo weavings. After returning the Northeast in 1967, she met her second husband David Loveless. In 1989, Loveless returned to Taos and wrote Three Weavers in 1992 and The Century Book in 1993. The Three Weavers is a biographical account which uses Loveless' weaving as a reference point as it explores the trio's craft and personal histories as it follows three New England weavers Loveless, Rachel Brown and Kristina Wilson through a 40-year time span during the Taos weaving revival where they are the only non-natives initially practicing the craft.

== Writing ==
- Activity, Recovery, Growth: The Communal Role of Planned Activities, Joan M. Erikson, David Loveless, Joan Loveless (1978)
- Three Weavers (1992)
- The Century Book (1993)
