= Agnes Martin: Between the Lines =

- Directed by: Leon d'Avigdor
- Produced by: Leon d'Avigdor
- Starring: Agnes Martin
- Cinematography: Jessica d'Avigdor
- Edited by: Olga Richter
- Production company: Leon d'Avigdor Film
- Distributed by: Leon d'Avigdor Film
- Release date: February 12, 2016
- Running time: 60 minutes
- Country: Germany
- Language: English

Agnes Martin: Between the Lines is a 2016 documentary film about the abstract painter Agnes Martin. It is based on footage which director Leon d'Avigdor took when they met in 2002 in Taos, New Mexico, Martin's final place of residence. The first version was a 15-minute film which was shown for three months several times daily during the stop of the large 2015/2017 retrospective of the artist, organized by Tate Modern, at Kunstsammlung NRW in Duesseldorf, Germany. It was also screened on various other occasions, mostly for educational purposes. The feature-length documentary was published on DVD in February 2016 for the European and in April 2016 for the North-American market. The film played in the official selection of 2016 Santa Barbara Fine Arts Film Festival.

== Description ==
Interviews with Agnes Martin and shots at work in her Taos Studio are cut against images of her paintings, archival footage, quotes from her writings and meditative sequences of the sea she is reported to have loved so much. The interviews center around Agnes Martin's insight to fundamental human experiences such as Love, Religion and Spirituality, Happiness, Friendship, Innocence and Death as well as various aspects of her life and art resp. the creative process. The visual style and editing rhythm of the film, supported by peaceful yet expressive music, reflect the contemplative simplicity and clarity of the artist's paintings. Interviews were shot against a black background with natural light only.
