= Clay Spohn =

American visual artist (1898–1977)

- Born: Clay Edgar Spohn; November 24, 1898; San Francisco, California, U.S.
- Died: December 19, 1977 (aged 79); New York City, New York, U.S.
- Education: California College of Arts and Crafts, University of California, Berkeley,California School of Fine Arts, Art Students League of New York, Académie Moderne
- Occupations: Painter, muralist, printmaker, sculptor, designer, educator
- Movement: Surrealism, fantasy art, abstract art

Clay Edgar Spohn (November 24, 1898 – December 19, 1977) was an American painter, muralist, printmaker, sculptor, designer, and educator. He taught at the California School of Fine Arts (now San Francisco Art Institute), and School of Visual Arts in New York City. Spohn's art has been described as "whimsical, abstract and satirical". He was a member of the collective American Abstract Artists.

== Early life and education ==
Clay Edgar Spohn was born on November 24, 1898, in San Francisco, California. He was raised in Berkeley, California, and graduated from Berkeley High School.

He attended the California College of Arts and Crafts (now California College of the Arts) from 1911 to 1912; the University of California, Berkeley from 1919 to 1921, under Perham Nahl; the California School of Fine Arts (now San Francisco Art Institute); the Art Students League of New York from 1922 to 1925, under Kenneth Hayes Miller, Boardman Robinson, George Luks and Guy DuBois; and the Académie Moderne in Paris from 1926 to 1927, under Fernand Léger and Othon Friesz.

At the Art Students League of New York, Spohn befriended sculptor Alexander Calder, who had an art studio near his classes while he was in Paris.

== Career ==
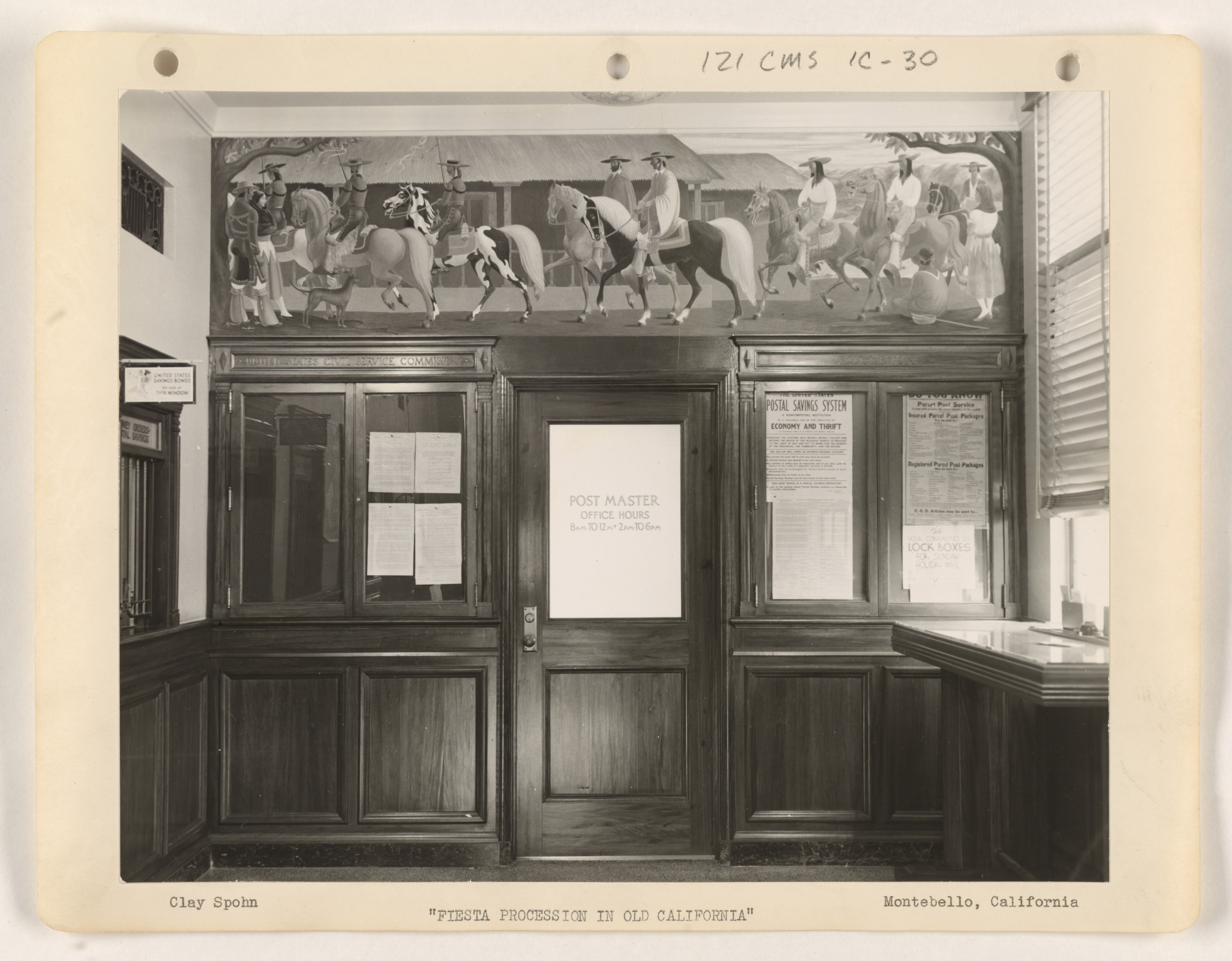
Fiesta Procession in Old California (1938) mural by Clay Spohn, in the post office in Montebello, California, now destroyed

Spohn returned to San Francisco Bay Area in 1927. He was employed by the Works Progress Administration (WPA) from 1935 to 1942, where he created copper bas relief murals, painted murals, paintings, and lithographs. He created a mural Fiesta Procession in Old California (1938) for the post office in Montebello, California (now destroyed), and a mural (1939) at Los Gatos Union High School (now Los Gatos High School) in Los Gatos, California.

In early 1942, Spohn created a body of work he called "Guerro-Graphs" consisting of gouache paintings of abstracted war machines. The San Francisco Museum of Art mounted Spohn's solo exhibition of this work titled, Fantastic War Machines and Guerragraphs (1942).

From 1945 to 1950, Spohn taught at the California School of Fine Arts (now San Francisco Art Institute), under the directorship of Douglas MacAgy. In 1941, he designed the decor for the first San Francisco Arts Festival.

Spohn moved to Taos, New Mexico from 1952 until 1958, and associated himself with the Taos art colony. In 1958, he worked as a lecturer at Mount Holyoke College, in Massachusetts. He taught at the School of Visual Arts (SVA) in New York City from 1964 to 1969.

In 1974, the Oakland Museum of California (OMCA) held retrospective exhibition for Spohn, curated by Terry St. John.

Spohn died on December 19, 1977, in New York City.

== Collections ==
His work is included in museum collections, including at the Museum of Modern Art in New York City; the National Gallery of Art in Washington, D.C.; Crocker Art Museum in Sacramento, California; San Francisco Museum of Modern Art; the Oakland Museum of California; the Harwood Museum of Art in Taos; and the Metropolitan Museum of Art in New York City.

== Exhibitions ==
=== Solo exhibitions ===
- 1942, Fantastic War Machines and Guerragraphs, solo exhibition, San Francisco Museum of Art, San Francisco, California
- 1974, solo retrospective exhibition, Oakland Museum of California, Oakland, California

=== Group exhibitions ===
- 1953, The Ruins, group exhibition, Record Shop, 3213 Central Ave. NE, Taos, New Mexico; including artists Spohn, Alfred Rogoway, Beatrice Mandelman, Dorothy Brett, Louise Ganthiers and Arthur Jacobson
- 1995, Pacific Dreams: Currents of Surrealism and Fantasy in California Art, 1934–1957, group exhibition, Oakland Museum of California, Oakland, California; including artists Spohn, Helen Lundeberg, Lorser Feitelson, Adaline Kent, Wolfgang Paalen, Salvador Dalí, Man Ray, Ruth Bernhard, John Gutmann, Edward Weston, Knud Merrild
