= Harwood Foundation =

- U.S. National Register of Historic Places
- NM State Register of Cultural Properties
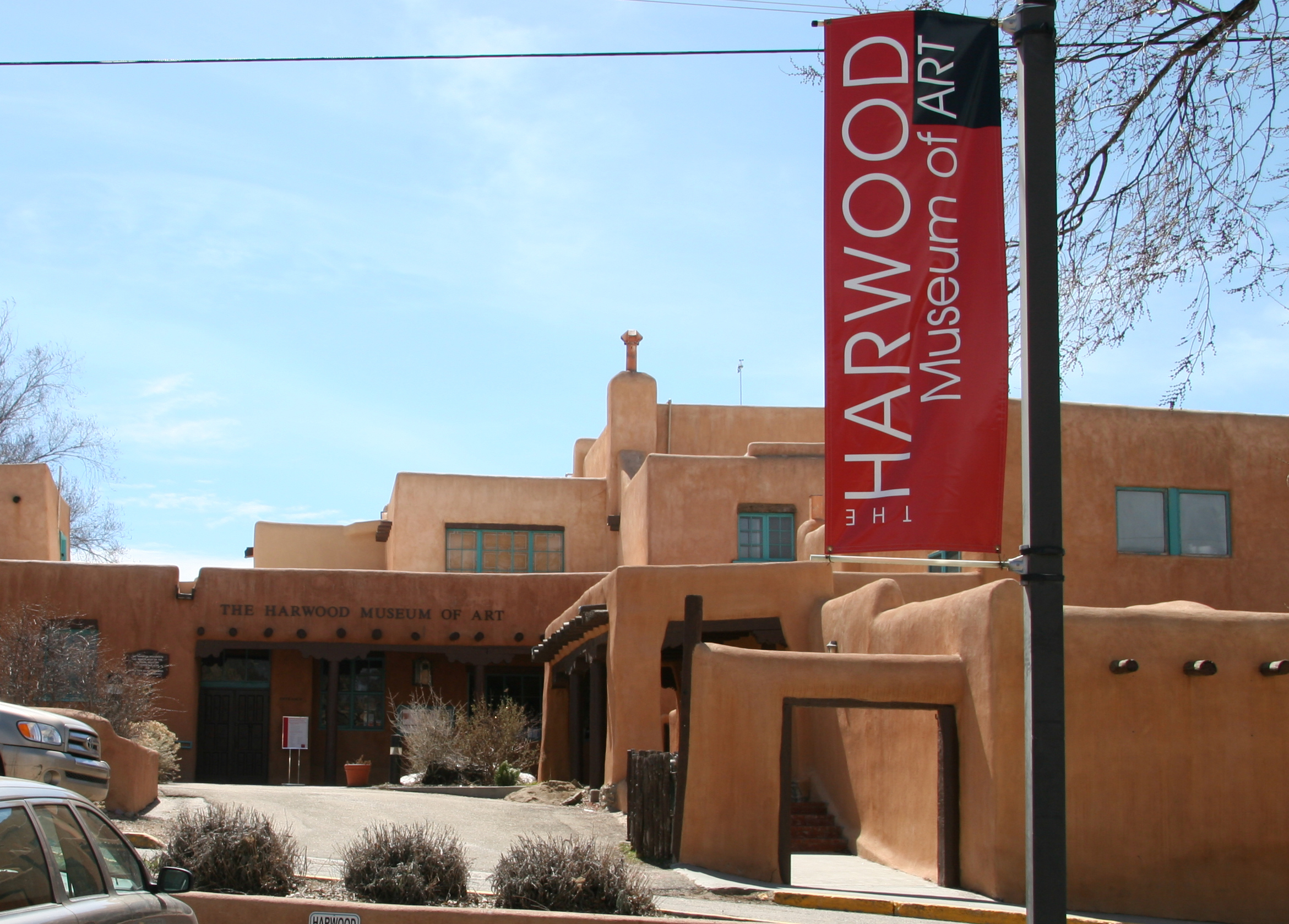
- Harwood Museum of Art

- Location within New Mexico
- Location: 238 Ledoux St., Taos, New Mexico
- Coordinates: 36°24′20″N 105°34′36″W
- Area: 0.8 acres (0.32 ha)
- Built: 1861
- Architect: Abe Bowring
- Architectural style: Pueblo, Spanish Pueblo Revival
- NRHP reference No.: 76001200
- NMSRCP No.: 362

Significant dates
- Added to NRHP: December 22, 1976
- Designated NMSRCP: February 28, 1975

Harwood Foundation is a non-profit organization in Taos, New Mexico that was listed as a National Register of Historic Places in 1976. For seventy-five years, serving as a public library, museum, auditorium, classrooms and meeting rooms, the Harwood was at the heart of the social and artistic life of Taos, New Mexico.

== History ==
Harwood Foundation was founded in Taos, New Mexico in 1923 by Elizabeth Harwood, widow of Burritt Harwood, and members of the Taos business and artist community. Her partners included artist Bert Geer Phillips, physician Thomas "Doc" Martin, artist Victor Higgins, B.G. Randall, and William M. Fayne. The foundation's vision was to have a library, cultural center and art center in a complex of buildings, called El Pueblito, purchased by Burritt and Elizabeth Harwood between 1916 and 1924.

The El Pueblito buildings were made of adobe, inspired by the Taos Pueblo architecture. The first home purchased by the Harwoods was previously owned by Smith H. Simpson, who served as a clerk for Kit Carson during the military campaign against the Ute Indians. Simpson purchased the home in 1861 and was available for sale to the Harwoods in 1916 upon Simpson's death.

The University of New Mexico was a partner of the foundation from 1929 until 1937, and ownership was then transferred to the university. Elizabeth Harwood resided within the complex until her death in 1938.

A new wing was added to the complex in 1937, using a grant from the Works Progress Administration. Spud Johnson served as library director from 1944 to 1947, and Toni Tarleton from 1954 to 1972. With funds from the Economic Development Administration and under the leadership of Jim Levy, the complex was renovated between 1978 and 1982, which modernized the electrical, heating, and plumbing systems. The services of the center were expanded during those years, to include a children's library, extensive outreach program, and an oral history project.

In 1993, the Town of Taos, the Friends of the Harwood Public Library and other community organizations began raising money to build a new library building. The Town of Taos contributed property it owned behind Town Hall and refinanced existing bonds to create major funds for the library. The Friends group raised an additional $300,000. Construction of the new building, designed by Robert Sturtcman, began in 1995 and the new library opened in July 1996.

As of 1998, the building, which no longer housed the public library, was renamed the Harwood Museum of Art and is still owned by the University of New Mexico.

== See also ==
- National Register of Historic Places listings in Taos County, New Mexico
