= MANAS (journal) =

MANAS was an eight-page philosophical fortnightly written, edited, and published by Henry Geiger from 1948 until December 1988. Each issue typically contained several short essays reflecting on the human condition, particularly examining environmental and ethical concerns from a global perspective. E. F. Schumacher's influential essay on Buddhist economics was published in the journal.
