= K20 Center =

The K20 Center for Educational and Community Renewal is a statewide research and development center located on the research campus of the University of Oklahoma.

== History ==
In 1995, the Oklahoma Networks for Excellence in Education (ONE) was formed, initially from six elementary schools from various settings, to create communities among Oklahoma schools for democratic education. In 2001, O.N.E.’s Executive Director Mary John O’Hair drafted a proposal to bring together teachers, administrators, students, parents, and community members to improve on local and international teaching methods.
