= Henry Geiger =

American editor and author (1908–1989)

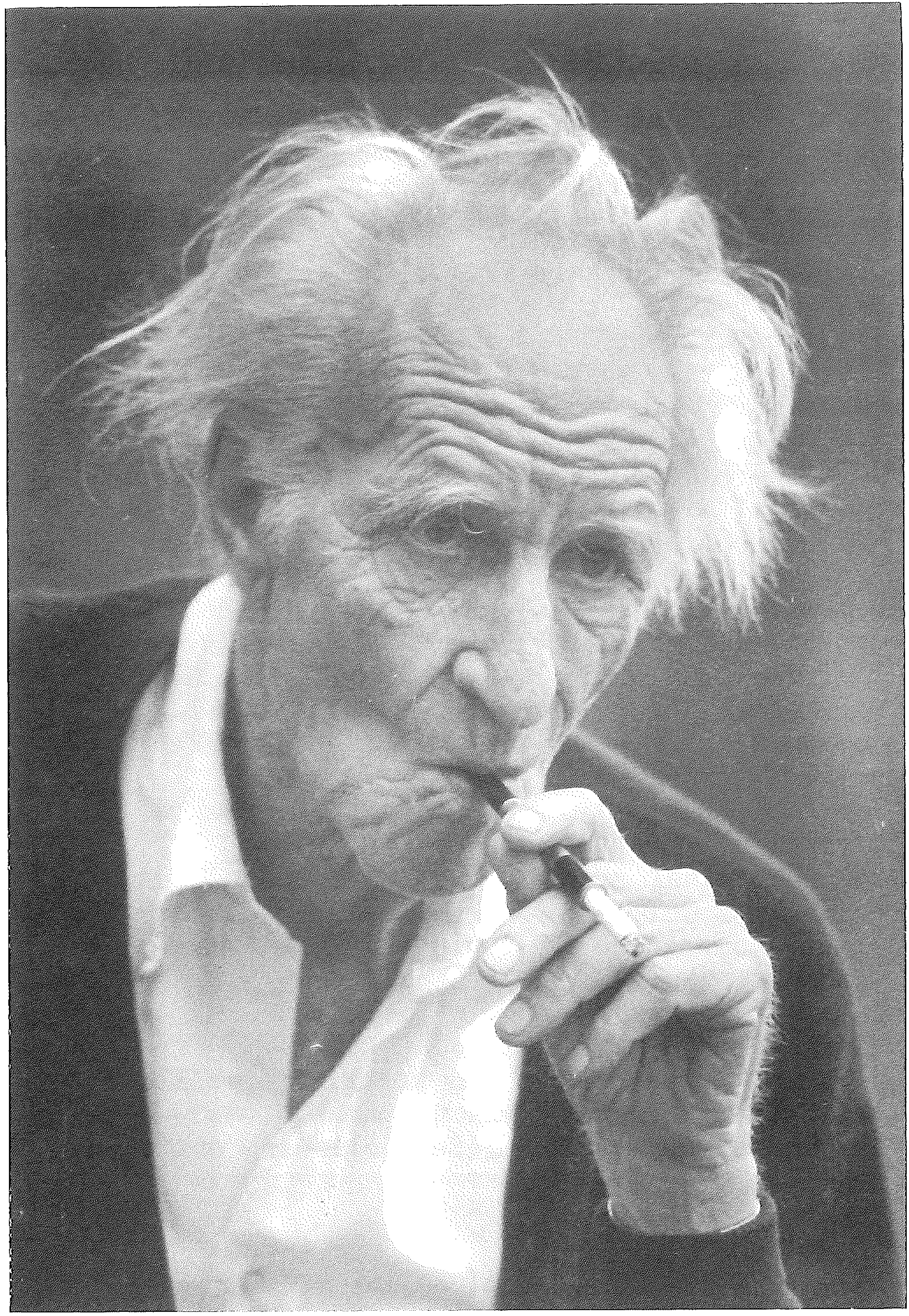

Henry Geiger (August 10, 1908 – 15 February 1989) was the editor, publisher, and chief writer of MANAS Journal which was published from 1948–1988.

He “had been variously a chorus boy on Broadway, a journalist, a conscientious objector in World War II, a commercial printer, and a lecturer at The United Lodge of Theosophists in Los Angeles.” Geiger began work as an actor when he was sixteen and spent three years working with the Theater Guild before becoming a journalist. While working as an actor, he had a small role in the original production of The Garrick Gaieties in 1925. During World War II, Geiger was a conscientious objector and was a member of the Civilian Public Service program. He worked at the CO Camp 76 at Glendora, where he helped found the pacifist newspaper Pacifica Views. The four-page weekly provided pacifists with "a forum for discussing pacifist ideas and methods of applying non-violent action to social reform".

Geiger published the first issue of his journal Manas in January 1948, while he living in Los Angeles. Abraham Maslow called him “the only small ‘p’ philosopher America has produced in this century.” Geiger was also an advocate of Edward Bellamy's type of socialism. Some of Geiger's associates, such as Lewis Hill, would later be involved in the creation of Pacifica Radio.
