= Louis Leon Ribak =

American painter

- Born: December 3, 1902; Grodno, Russian Empire
- Died: December 21, 1979 (aged 77); Taos, New Mexico, United States
- Known for: Painting, drawing
- Movement: Social realism
- Spouse: Beatrice Mandelman (m. 1942)

Louis Leon Ribak (3 December 1902 – 21 December 1979) was an American social realist and abstract painter who was a member of the "Taos Moderns" group of artists.

== Biography ==
Born to a Jewish family in Grodno in the Russian Empire, Ribak emigrated to New York City at the age of ten with his family. He studied at the Pennsylvania Academy of the Fine Arts for a year in 1922, and the Art Students League of New York in 1923 under John Sloan. In 1929, he became a founding member of the John Reed Club, which was organized to support leftist artists and writers and was closely associated with the Marxist magazine The New Masses.

In the 1930s and 1940s, Ribak painted in a Social Realist style, exhibiting with fellow Social Realists like Reginald Marsh and Raphael Soyer. In the 1930s, he also worked as a muralist for the Works Progress Administration; among these works is the 1939 mural View Near Albemarle in the U.S. Post Office in Albemarle, North Carolina. In 1933, he assisted Diego Rivera on his mural Man at the Crossroads, commissioned for Rockefeller Center and destroyed before completion.

Ribak met fellow artist Beatrice Mandelman in New York at a dance sponsored by the Artists Union, and the two married in 1942. He served in the military for two years during World War 2 and was discharged because of asthma. Seeking a healthier climate, Ribak and Mandelman moved to Taos, New Mexico in 1944. At this point, Ribak shifted to a more abstract style and brighter color palette.

In 1947, he and Mandelman founded the Taos Valley Art School, and Ribak was its director and an instructor until it closed in 1955.

Ribak died in Taos in 1979. His work is in the permanent collections of the Whitney Museum of American Art (New York) and The Newark Museum of Art (New Jersey), among other institutions.

The Mandelman-Ribak Foundation was established to preserve the legacy of Ribak and Mandelman; among other activities, it catalogued a half century of their work held in the Mandelman-Ribak Collection. In 2014, the collection and associated personal papers were donated to the University of New Mexico.
