= Oli Sihvonen =

Finnish-American artist (1921–1991)

- Born: January 31, 1921; Brooklyn, New York
- Died: April 3, 1991 (aged 70); New York, New York
- Education: Black Mountain College
- Known for: Abstract painting, study of color
- Movement: Geometric abstraction

Oli Sihvonen (January 31, 1921 – April 3, 1991) was a post-World War II American artist known for hard-edge abstract paintings. Sihvonen's style was greatly influenced by Josef Albers who taught him color theory and Bauhaus aesthetics at Black Mountain College in the 1940s. Sihvonen was also influenced by Russian Constructivism, Piet Mondrian, and Pierre Matisse. His work has been linked to Abstract Expressionism, Minimalism, Hard-Edge and Op-Art.

== Biography ==
Oli Sihvonen was a Finnish-American born in Brooklyn, New York in 1921. He began his art career by attending the Norwich Art School, now known as Norwich University College of the Arts, in Connecticut from 1933 to 1938. He then studied at the Art Students League of New York from 1938 to 1941.

He served in the U. S. Army during World War II. His art skills brought him into the 603rd Engineer Camouflage Battalion, part of the so-called Ghost Army, and he served in Europe with the unit. After that he studied art from his mentor Josef Albers at Black Mountain College in North Carolina from 1946 to 1948, where he met and befriended many people including Buckminster Fuller, Merce Cunningham, Robert Creeley, John Cage. Tapestry weaver Joan Potter Loveless also attended Black Mountain and the couple married in 1947.

Throughout his career Sihvonen was noted for his dedication to painting that began at Black Mountain College and carried through to his time in Taos, New Mexico where he started to be recognized for his ellipse paintings, and then also in New York where he received much critical, if not financial, success. "His entire body of work remained clean, objective and flat, with no gestural or emotional contrivances."

After graduating from Black Mountain, Sihvonen lived and studied in New Mexico under the G.I. Bill at Louis Ribak’s Taos Valley Art School from 1949 to 1950. He then went to Mexico where he painted murals. He then moved to Washington D.C. and later New York where he taught at Hunter College and Cooper Union. In the 1950s Sihvonen moved to Taos, New Mexico where he stayed until the 1960s. During this time he painted large canvases and diptychs. While in Taos he was considered a part of a group of modern artists known as the Taos Moderns. Because of the scale and subject matter of his paintings there wasn't a strong market for them in New Mexico in the 1950s and 1960s, but he was gaining attention in New York. In 1965 The Museum of Modern Art acquired one of his Ellipse paintings for the exhibition "The Responsive Eye." He moved to back to New York in 1967.

Through the 1970s and 1980s Sihvonen continued to paint and exhibit regularly. He spent time with Allan Graham in New York - in the mid to late 1980s Sihvonen gave Graham a roll of echocardiograms of his heart and suggested he make something out of them. These became Graham's 1995 series Heart Sutra and they were exhibited alongside a selection of Sihvonen's paintings in 2000 at a SITE Santa Fe exhibition.

== Awards ==
- 1988 Pollack-Krasner Foundation
- 1980, 1985 Yaddo Art Colony, fellowship
- 1985 Adolph and Esther Gottlieb Foundation
- 1967, 1977 National Endowment for the Arts

== Selected public collections ==
- The Museum of Modern Art
- The Whitney Museum of American Art
- The Art Institute of Chicago
- Corcoran Gallery of Art
- Dallas Museum of Fine Art
- University of Michigan
- Albuquerque Museum of Art and History
- Fine Arts Museum, Santa Fe, New Mexico
- Rose Art Museum, Brandeis University
- Northwestern University
- Worcester Art Museum, MA
- The Governor Nelson A. Rockefeller Empire State Plaza Art Collection, Albany, NY

== Exhibitions ==
- 2016 David Rich Gallery, Santa Fe, New Mexico, Color: Stained, Brushed and Poured
- 2016 Dallas Museum of Art, Dallas, Texas, Passages in Modern Art: 1946-1996
- 2012 James Kelly Contemporary, Santa Fe, New Mexico, Energy Fields (solo exhibition)
- 2011 The Harwood Museum of Art, Taos, New Mexico, Oli Sihvonen: The Final Years (solo exhibition)
- 2010 Museum Moderner Kunst Stiftung Ludwig - MUMOK, Vienna, Austria, Bilder über Bilder
- 2008 Fundación Juan March, Madrid, Spain, MAXImin
- 2007 James Kelly Contemporary, Santa Fe, New Mexico, Ellipse Paintings from the 1960s (solo exhibition)
- 2004 Neuerwerbungen, Daimler Contemporary, Berlin, Germany, Minimalism and After III
- 2000 SITE Santa Fe, Santa Fe, New Mexico, Allan Graham - As REAL as thinking (including paintings by Oli Sihoven)
- 1994 Corcoran Gallery of Art, Washington, DC, Still Working
- 1991 Hunter College Art Gallery, New York, New York, Selections 1991
- 1983, 1988 American Abstract Artists, auspices of U.S.I.A., traveling exhibition
- 1987 New York Cultural Center, New York, New York, American Abstract Artists
- 1987 Bard College, Annandale on Hudson, New York, & The Grey Art Gallery, New York, The Arts at Black Mountain College
- 1983 Craig Cornelius Gallery, New York, New York (solo exhibition)
- 1983 Hoshour Gallery, Albuquerque, New Mexico
- 1978 Hoshour Gallery, Albuquerque, New Mexico (solo exhibition)
- 1977 Roswell Museum and Art Center, Roswell, New Mexico
- 1970 Fine Arts Museum, University of New Mexico, Albuquerque, New Mexico, Faculty Artists 1960-1970
- 1968 Witte Memorial Museum, San Antonio, Texas, Awarded Artists of the Southwest
- 1968 Albright-Knox Gallery, Buffalo, New York, Plus X Minus, Today's Half Century
- 1965, 1967 The Whitney Museum of American Art, New York, New York, Whitney Annual
- 1967 Rice University Art Gallery, Houston, Texas - Inaugural Exhibit, Sihvonen (solo exhibition)
- 1967 Dallas Contemporary Art Museum, Dallas, Texas, 4 Dallas Collectors
- 1967 Corcoran Gallery of Art, Washington, DC, 30th Biennial
- 1966 The Museum of Modern Art, New York, New York, New Acquisitions, OP Art
- 1965 The Museum of Modern Art, New York, New York, The Responsive Eye
- 1965 El Paso Museum, El Paso, Texas, Art & Atom
- 1965 Burpee Art Museum, Rockford, Illinois, 50 States Exhibition (solo exhibition)
- 1964 Denver Art Museum, Denver, Colorado, 70th Western Annual
- 1964 University of Michigan, Ann Arbor, Michigan, The New Formalists
- 1963 Stable Gallery, New York, New York, Sihvonen (solo exhibition)
- 1962 The Whitney Museum of American Art, New York, New York, Geometric Abstraction in America
- 1960, 1961 Betty Parsons Gallery, New York, New York, New Names
- 1956, 1966 Galleria Escondida, Taos Art Association, Taos, New Mexico
- 1956 Johnson Gallery, University of New Mexico, Alburquerque, New Mexico
