= List of United States post office murals in Ohio =

Following is a list of United States post office murals created in Ohio between 1934 and 1943.

Location	Mural title	Image	Artist	Date	Notes	NRHPlisted
Ada	Country Dance		Albert Kotin	1940	oil on canvas	
Amherst	Pioneers Crossing the Ohio River		Michael Loew	1941	oil on canvas; building is now the city's headquarters for a Main Street revitalization project.	
Barnesville	The Drift Towards Industrialism		Michael Sarisky	1937	oil on canvas; lost but replacement commissioned by the Belmont County Historical Society	
Bedford	The Flight to Industry		Karl Anderson	1937	oil on canvas Building now used by as offices for an architectural firm.	
Bellevue	Ohio		Paul Meltsner	1937		
Bluffton	Joseph Deford and His Friends Build the First Cabin in Bluffton		Sante Graziani	1941	oil on canvas	
Bridgeport	Ohio Harvest		Richard Hay Kenah	1940	oil on canvasl winner of the 48-State Mural Competition	
Caldwell	Noble County-Ohio		Robert Lepper	1938	tempera	
Canton	Steel Industry		Glenn M. Shaw	1937	Treasury Relief Art Project; thirteen panels	
Chardon	Maple Sugar Camp		George Picken	1942	oil on canvas; mural has been moved to an office nearby	
Cincinnati	Landmarks of Cincinnati		John Holmes	1934	Public Works of Art Project	
Cincinnati	Landmarks of Cincinnati		Paul Chidlaw	1934	Public Works of Art Project	
Cincinnati	Landmarks of Cincinnati		Frederick Springer	1934	Public Works of Art Project	
Cincinnati	Landmarks of Cincinnati		Richard Zoellner	1934	Public Works of Art Project	
Main Post Office, Cleveland	Post Office Interiors		Jack Greitzer	1936	oil on canvas Two panels	
Pearlbrook Branch, Cleveland	Ore Docks and Steel Mills		Richard Zoellner	1938		
University Center Branch, Cleveland	Historical and Modern Scenes of Cleveland		Clarence Zyuld	1937		
University Center Branch, Cleveland	Historical and Modern Scenes of Cleveland		John Czosz	1937		
Coldwater	Coldwater Activities		Joep Nicolas	1942	oil on canvas	
Crestline	The Crossroads-Crestline, Ohio		Gifford Beal	1943	oil on canvas	
Dennison	Passenger Pigeon		Edmund Sawyer	1940	oil on canvas	
East Liverpool	Old Bennett Pottery Plant		Roland Schweinsburg	1936	15-foot lunette commissioned by the Treasury Relief Art Project The building is now the Museum of Ceramics	
East Palestine	Early East Palestine and Dr. Rhett Chamberlain's Post Office and Warehouse		Rolf Stoll	1937	oil on canvas	
Eaton	Van Ausdel's Trading Post		Roland Schweinsburg	1939	oil on canvas	
Fairborn (formerly Osborn)	Wright Brothers in Ohio		Henry Simon	1941	oil on canvas	
Gambier	Bishop C. Chase Selects Site of Kenyon College		Norris Rahming	1943	oil on canvas	
Geneva	Rural Homestead		William Sommer	1939	oil on canvas	
Georgetown	Tobacco Harvest		Richard Zoellner	1938	oil on canvas	
Girard	Workers of the Soil		John Edward Costigan	1938	Mural destroyed	
Granville	First Pulpit in Granville		Wendell Jones	1938	oil on canvas	
Hamilton	Fort Hamilton Agriculture Industries of Hamilton		Richard Zoellner	1934	Six panels	
Hubbard	Steel Industry		Hugh Mesibov	1934	oil on canvas	
Louisville	Farn and Mill		Herschel Levit	1941	tempera	
McConnelsville	Mail-the Connecting Link		Sally Haley	1938	oil on canvas	
Marysville	The Farmer		James Egleson	1940	fresco	
Maumee	Communication		Rudolph Scheffler	1938	oil on canvas	
Medina	Gathering the Apple Crop		Richard Zoellner	1938	oil on canvas; mural was destroyed	
Montpelier	Harvest, the Annals of America		Leonard Ahneman	1941	oil on canvas	
Mount Gilead	Pioneering to Progress		Julius Wyhof	1938	oil on canvas	
New Concord	Skaters		Clyde Singer	1941	oil on canvas	
New Lexington	Great Men Came from the Hills		Isabel Bishop	1938	oil on canvas	
New London	New London Facets		Lloyd R. Ney	1940	oil on canvas The only officially Section mural to be labeled "abstract"	
Oak Harbor	Early Oak Harbor		Clarence Zuelch	1940	oil on canvas	
Orrville	Judge Smith Orr and Robert Taggard Planning the New Settlement at Orville-1852		Aldo Lazzarini	1937	oil on canvas	
Perrysburg	Building of Fort Meigs, 1813		Glenn M. Shaw	1937	oil on canvas	
Portsmouth	Characteristic Local Scenes in Portsmouth		Clarence Carter	1938	oil on canvas, four panels	
Portsmouth	Waterfront		Richard Zoellner	1937	oil on canvas	
Portsmouth	Coal Barges		Richard Zoellner	1937	oil on canvas	
Ravenna	Early Ravenna		Clarence Carter	1936	oil on canvas	
Springfield	Printing in Springfield		Herman H. Wessel	1937		
Springfield	Manufacture of Farm Implements		Herman H. Wessel	1937		
Tipp City	Construction of Miami-Erie Canal in Miami City		Herman Zimmerman	1940	tempera	
Upper Sandusky	The Mail		Alois Fabry	1937	oil on canvas	
Wadsworth	They came as Wadsworth's First Settler after the War of 1812		F. Thornton Martin	1938	oil on canvas	
Wapaknneta	Wapakonata and American History		Joseph Limarzi	1937		
Warren	Romance of Steel, Old and Romance of Steel, Modern		Glenn Shaw	1938	oil on canvas	
Wauseon	Cooperative Planning and Development in Wauseon		Jack Greitzer	1938	oil on canvas	
Waverly	Arrival of Packet		Roy Best	1942	oil on canvas	
Westerville	The Daily Mail		Olive Nuhfer	1937	oil on canvas	
Willard	The Roundhouse		Mitchell Jamieson	1941	oil on canvas	
Willoughby	White Man's First Sight of Lake Erie		Sterling Smeltzer	1938	oil on canvas; mural is missing	
Yellow Springs	Yellow Springs-Preparation for Lifework		Axel Horn	1941	oil on canvas	
