= 9th Street Art Exhibition =

1951 art show in New York City, USA; debut of the abstract expressionist art movement

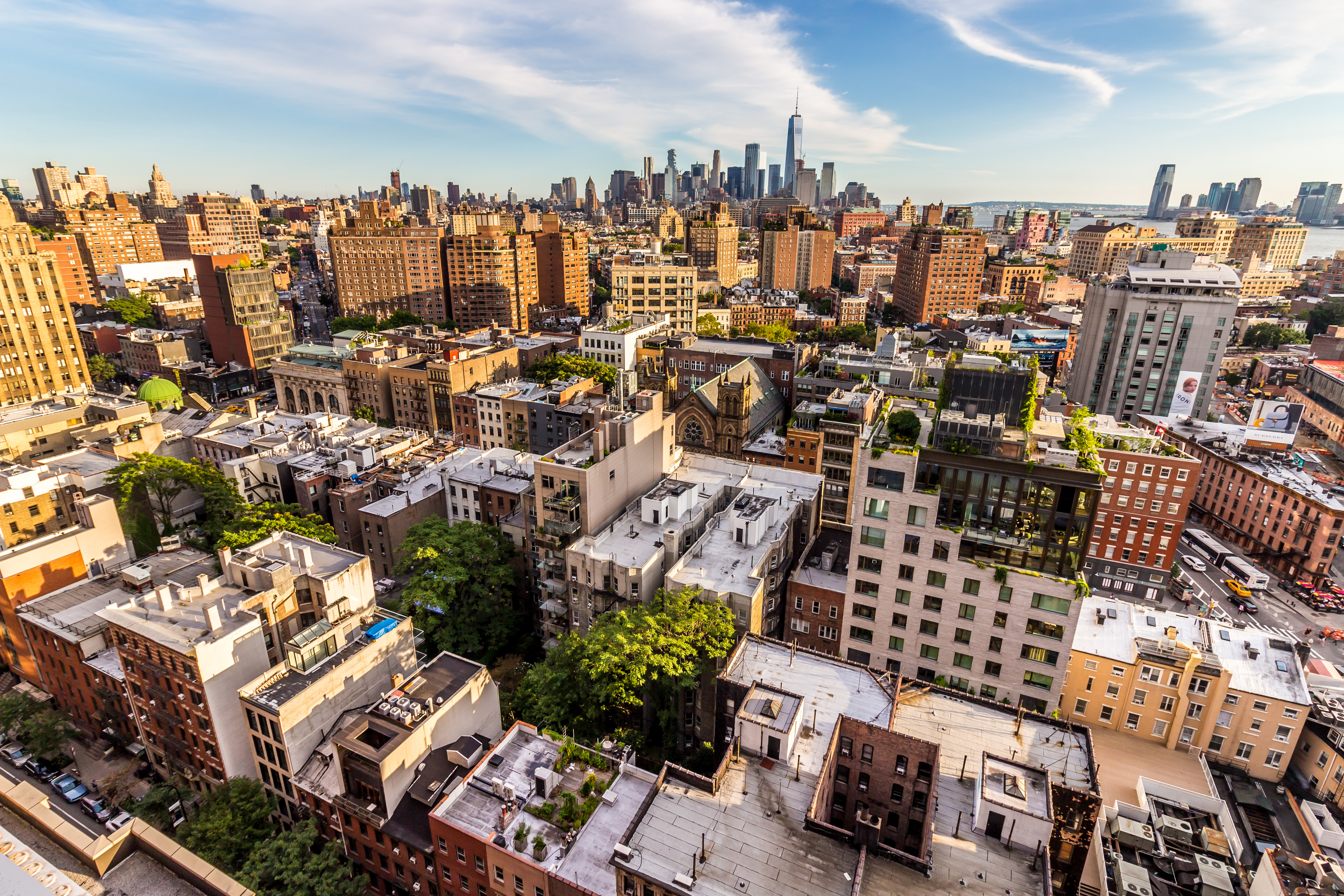
- "Greenwich Village" by Felix Stahlberg, 2017.
- Date: Monday, May 21, 1951 to Sunday, June 10, 1951
- Duration: 20 days
- Venue: 60 East 9th Street, New York, New York 10003
- Location: Greenwich Village, Manhattan, New York City, United States
- Also known as: "Ninth Street Show" and "9th Street Show"
- Type: Abstract Expressionism
- Theme: Group Show
- Organized by: Leo Castelli, curator and financial backer. Franz Kline, promotional designer. Aaron Siskind, event photographer.
- Participants: Key figures in abstract expressionism, America's first internationally influential art movement.

The 9th Street Art Exhibition of Paintings and Sculpture is the official title artist Franz Kline hand-lettered onto the poster he designed for the Ninth Street Show (May 21-June 10, 1951). Now considered historic, the artist-led exhibition marked the formal debut of Abstract Expressionism, and the first American art movement with international influence. The School of Paris, long the headquarters of the global art market, typically launched new movements, so there was both financial and cultural fall-out when all the excitement was suddenly emanating from New York. The postwar New York avant-garde, artists like Willem de Kooning and Jackson Pollock, would soon become "art stars," commanding large sums and international attention. The Ninth Street Show marked their "stepping-out," and that of nearly 75 other artists, including Harry Jackson, Helen Frankenthaler, Michael Goldberg, Joan Mitchell, Grace Hartigan, Robert De Niro Sr., John Ferren, Philip Guston, Elaine de Kooning, Louis Schanker, Lee Krasner, Franz Kline, Ad Reinhardt, Ludwig Sander, David Smith, Milton Resnick, Joop Sanders, Robert Motherwell, Barnett Newman, and many others who were then mostly unknown to an art establishment that ignored experimental art without a ready market.

The artist-led show was intended to make names — and it did. Word of the exhibition slipped out before its Monday night preview, but that only added to the interest. Author Mary Gabriel writes, "Nothing sold, but no one cared. The exhibition had earned the artists attention on their own terms." Another later wrote, "It appeared as though a line had been crossed, a step into a larger art world whose future was bright with possibility." The form of art — the New York School — was later called "the quintessential American and modern art movement."

== Organization ==
=== The Club ===
During the late 1940s and early 1950s, dozens of painters and sculptors had art studios in lower Manhattan between 8th and 12th streets and First and Sixth Avenues. Collectively known as the Downtown Group, many of them were former Federal Art Project artists, including Philip Pavia, Willem de Kooning, Landes Lewitin, Franz Kline and Jack Tworkov. Several had served in the military during World War II.

In 1949, members of the Downtown Group, helmed by Pavia, created a more structured group that met regularly on 39 East 8th Street, and came to be known as "The Club." Weekly discussions at the Club led to the idea of organizing the 9th Street Art Exhibition as a launching pad.

=== The artists ===
"Since few of them had ever received any significant notice," the New Yorker's Claudia Roth Pierpont writes, describing both the artists and the exhibition's selection process, "the rush to participate was so intense that everyone was limited to a single piece. Even in this renegade atmosphere," she continues, "there was some initial discussion of whether including women in the exhibition would diminish its chance of being taken seriously. Eventually, the jury selected eleven women, and sixty-one men, to represent the creatively rich (if otherwise impoverished) new downtown art world, with its cheap industrial lofts, such as the Coenties Slip, high communal spirits, and almost universal devotion to abstraction." 74 artists were exhibited; the following 64 were listed on Franz Kline's poster.

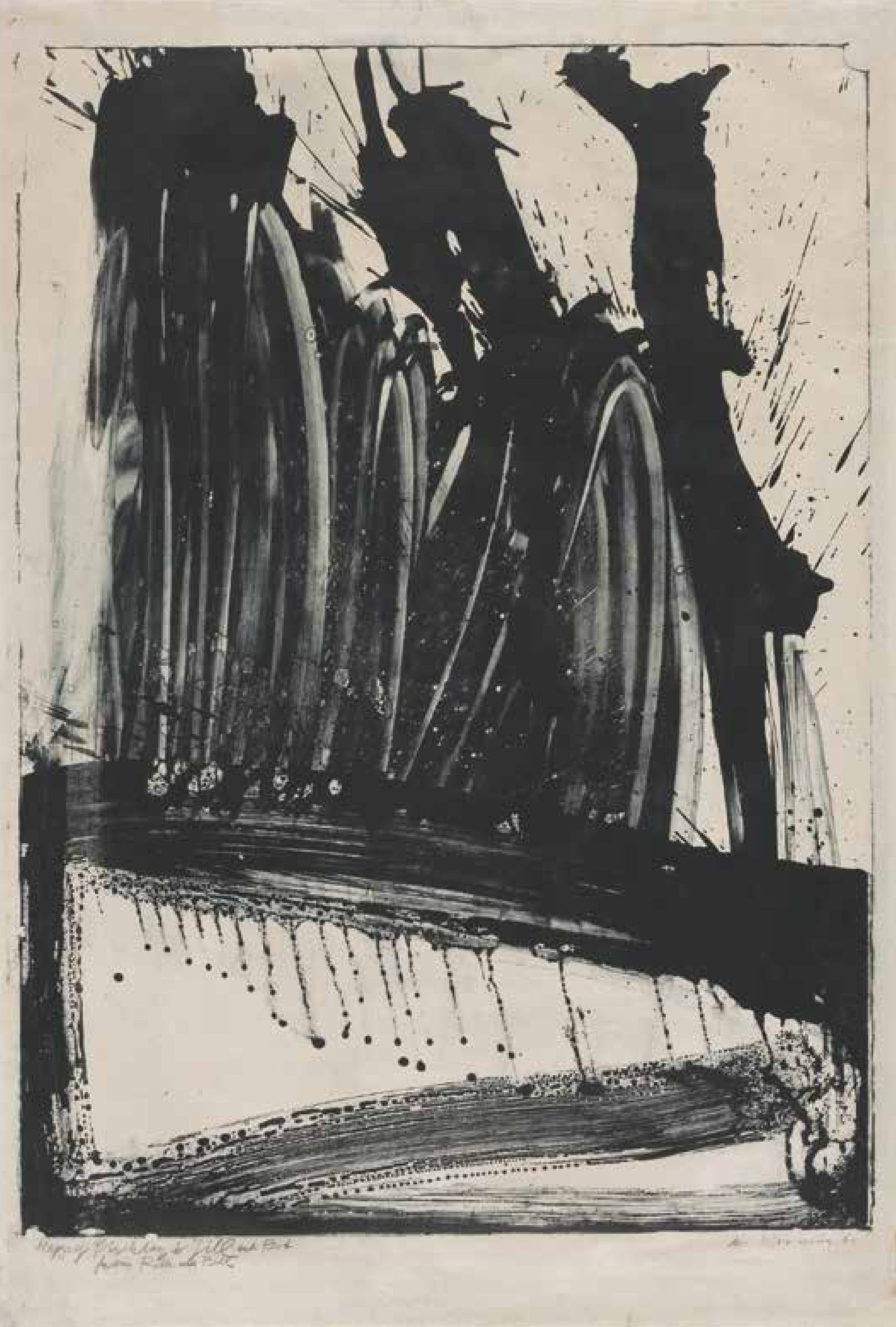
Willem de Kooning. Litho #2 (Waves #2) by Willem de Kooning, 1960, lithograph, 47 13/16 x 32 5/16 in.

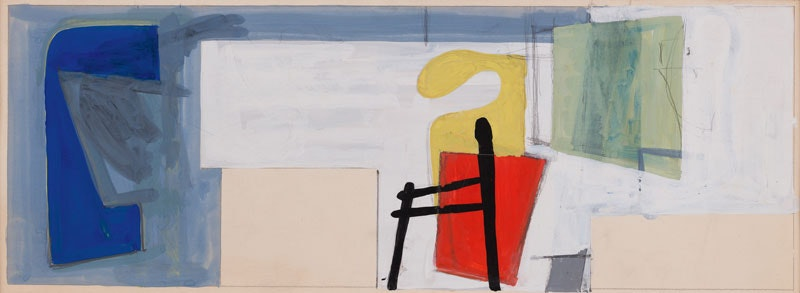
Lee Krasner. Untitled Mural Study, 1940. Gouache and collage on paper, 7 3/16 x 23 1/4 in.

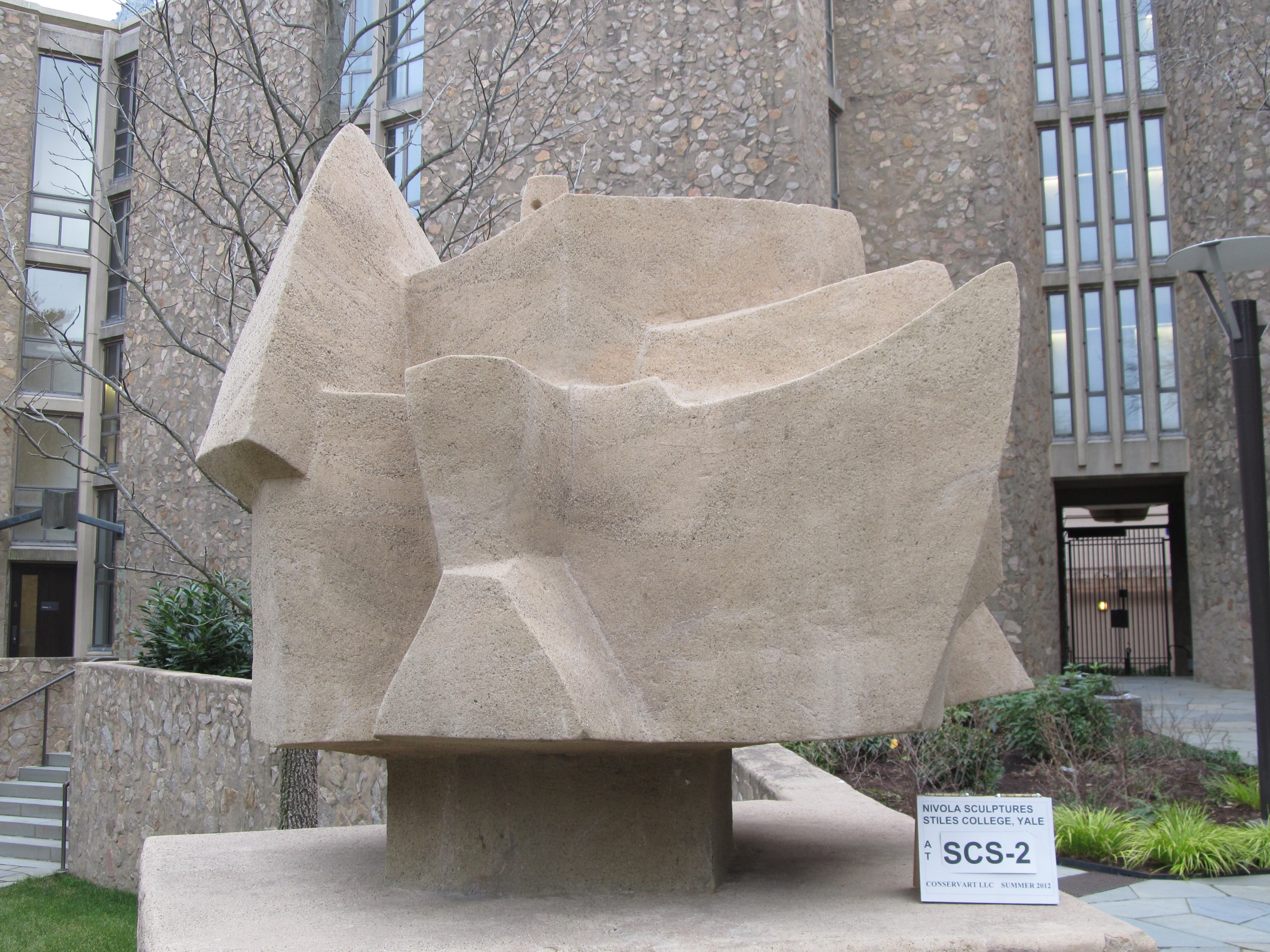
Costantino Nivola. Cast stone sculpture after treatment. 1962.

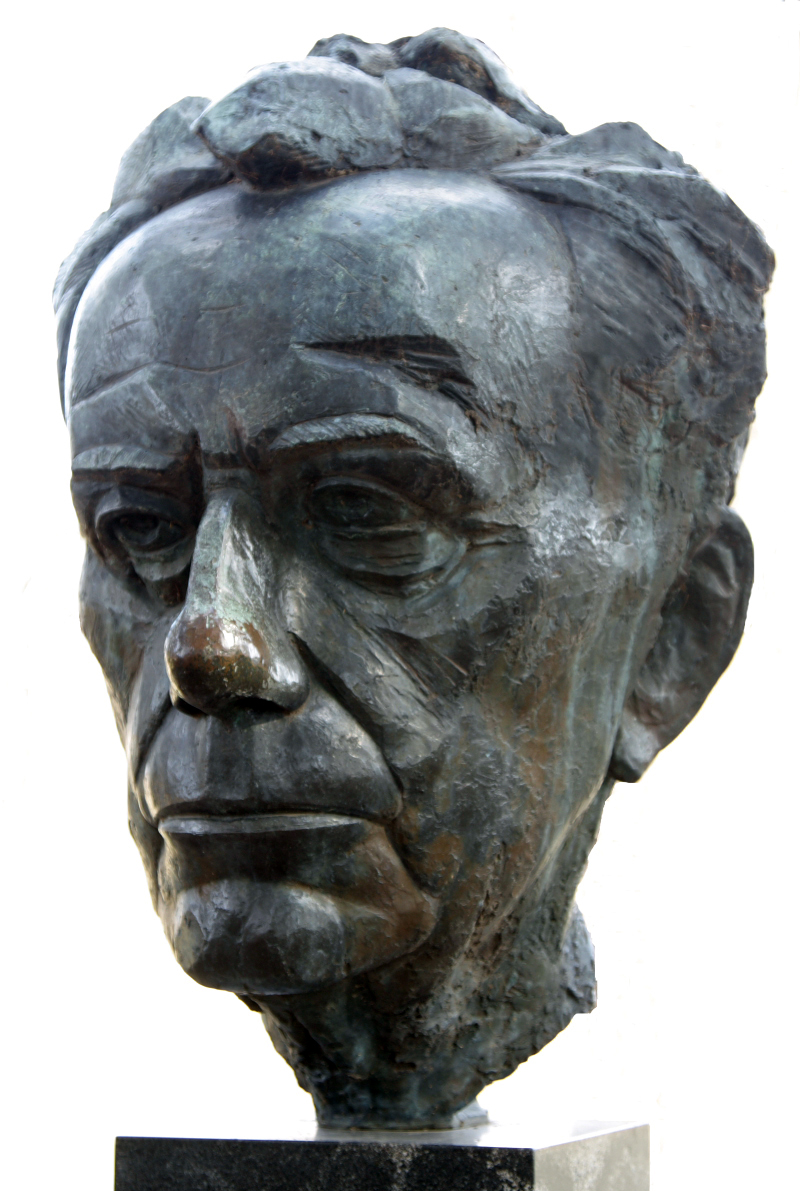
James Rosati. Bust of Paul Johannes Tillich (daylight). c. 1965.

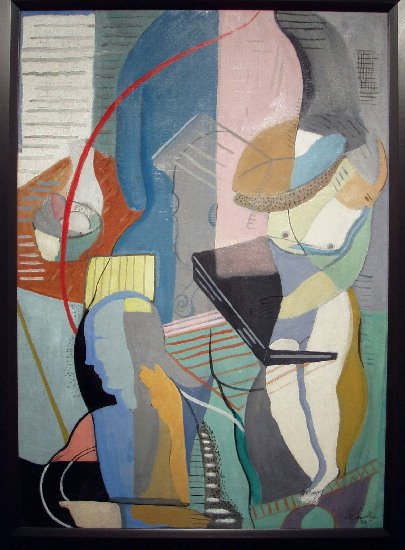
Louis Schanker. Abstraction With Musical Instruments. Oil on canvas. 1932.

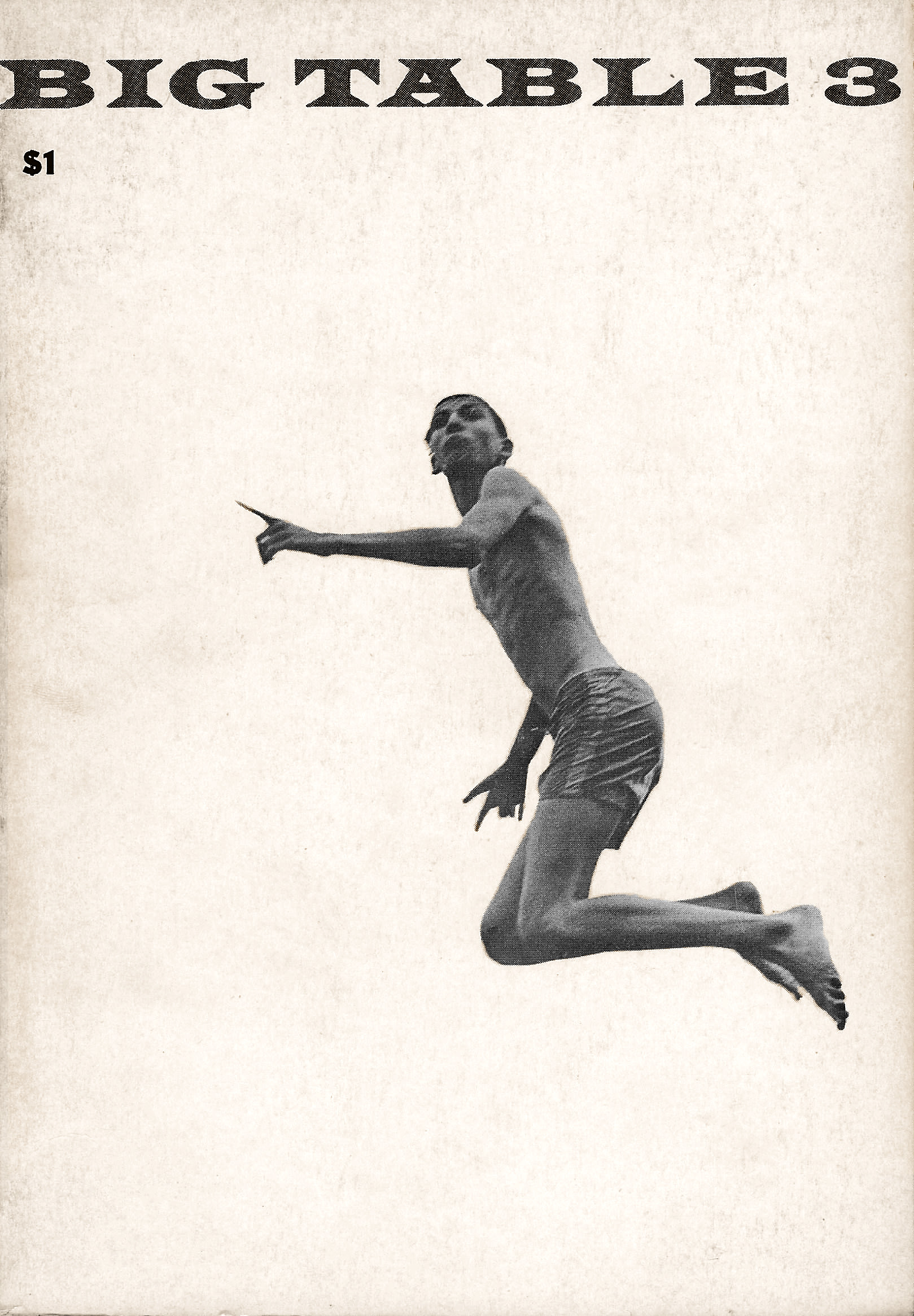
Aaron Siskind. Cover photographer for American literary magazine Big Table, 1959.

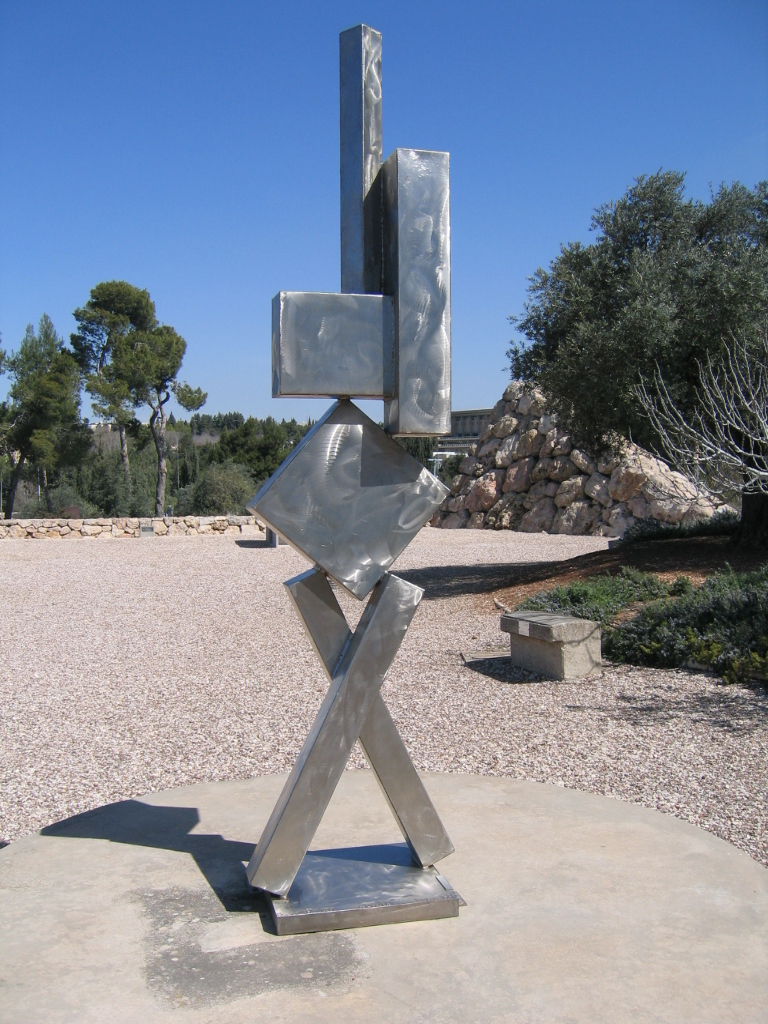
David Smith. Cubi VI, 1963. Stainless steel. The Israel Museum, Jerusalem.

==== By name ====
(Source: 9th St. Art Exhibition poster, 1951)

- L. Alcopley (1910–1992)
- Rene Robert Bouche (1906–1963)
- Theodore Brenson (1893–1959)
- James Brooks (1906–1992)
- Peter Busa (1914–1985)
- Giorgio Cavallon (1904–1989)
- Nicolas Carone (1917–2010)
- Elaine de Kooning (1918–1989)
- Willem de Kooning (1904–1997)
- Robert De Niro, Sr. (1922–1993)
- Enrico Donati (1909–2008)
- Friedel Dzubas (1915–1994)
- Jimmy Ernst (1920–1984)
- Herbert Ferber (1906–1991)
- John Ferren (1905–1970)
- Perle Fine (1908–1988)
- Helen Frankenthaler (1928–2011)
- Michael Goldberg (Stuart) (1924–2007)
- Robert Goodnough (1917–2010)
- Clement Greenberg (1909–1998)
- Peter Grippe (1912–2002)
- Philip Guston (1913–1980)
- Grace Hartigan (George) (1922–2008)
- Hans Hofmann (1880–1966)
- Harry Jackson (1924–2011)
- Hugh Kappel (1910–1982)
- Earl Kerkam (1891–1965)
- Franz Kline (1910–1962)
- Gitou Knoop (1909–1985)
- Albert Kotin (1907–1980)
- Lee Krasner (1908–1984)
- Alfred Leslie (1927–2023)
- Richard Lippold (1915–2002)
- Seymour Lipton (1903–1986)
- Conrad Marca-Relli (1913–2000)
- Boris Margo (1902–1995)
- George McNeil (1908–1995)
- Joan Mitchell (1925–1992)
- Robert Motherwell (1915–1991)
- Costantino Nivola (1911–1988)
- Jackson Pollock (1912–1956)
- Fairfield Porter (1907–1975)
- Richard Pousette-Dart (1916–1992)
- Melville Price (1920–1970)
- Ad Reinhardt (1913–1967)
- Milton Resnick (1917–2004)
- Robert Richenburg (1917–2006)
- Robert Rauschenberg (1925–2008)
- James Rosati (1912–1988)
- Anne Ryan (1889–1954)
- Ludwig Sander (1906–1975)
- Joop Sanders (1921–2023)
- Louis Schanker (1903–1981)
- Day Schnabel (1905–1991)
- Sonia Sekula (1918–1963)
- Aaron Siskind (1903-1991)
- David Smith (1906–1965)
- Theodoros Stamos (1922–1997)
- Joe Stefanelli (1921–2017)
- John Stephan (1906–1994)
- Jean Steubing (1929–2019)
- Yvonne Thomas (1913-2009)
- Bradley Walker Tomlin (1899–1953)
- Jack Tworkov (1900–1982)
- Esteban Vicente (1903–2001)

==== By photo ====
(Selection was limited by availability.)

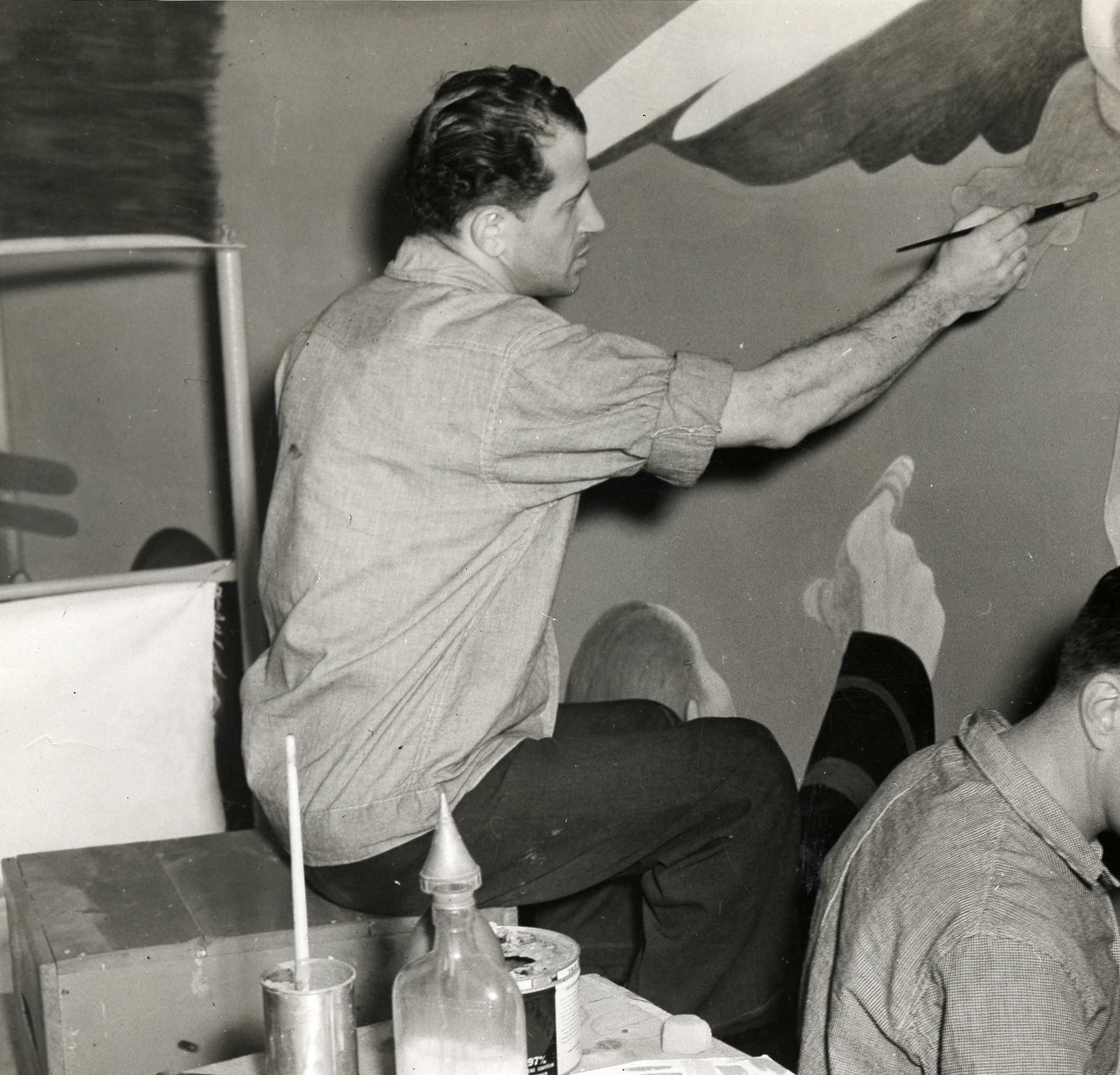
Painter James Brooks in 1940

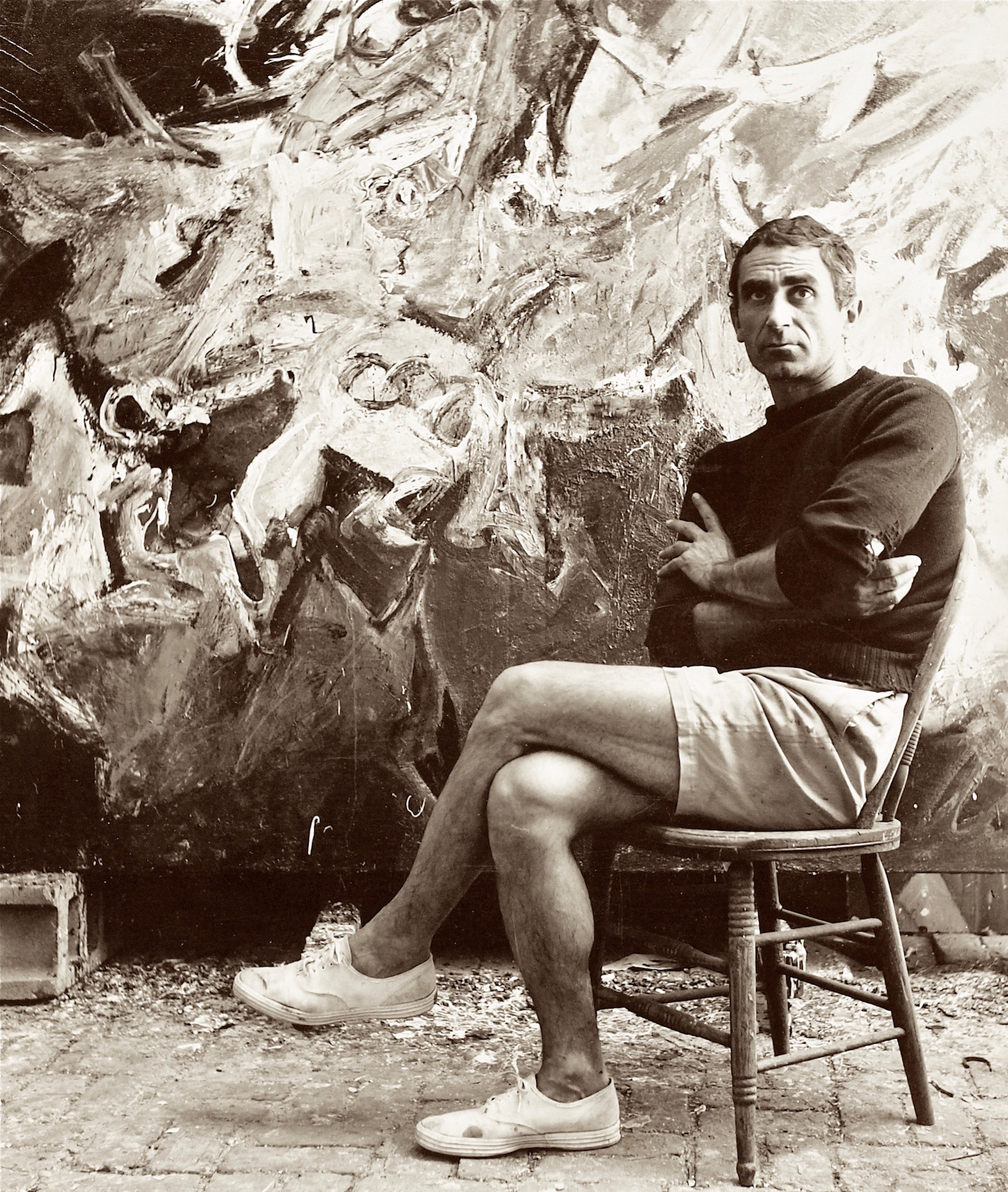
Painter Nicolas Carone in the late 1950s.

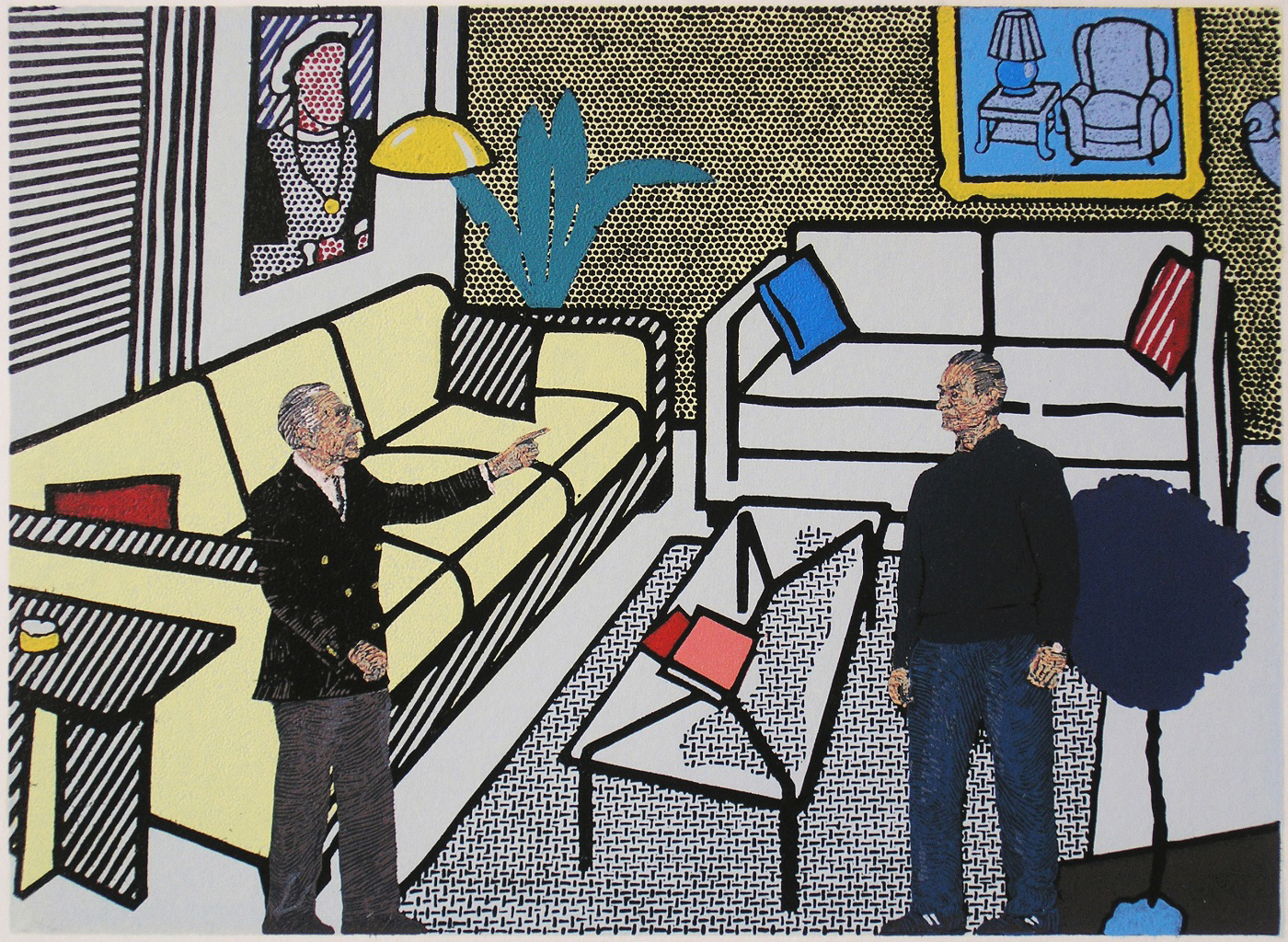
Curator Leo Castelli (right) beside a Roy Lichtenstein painting in 1992.

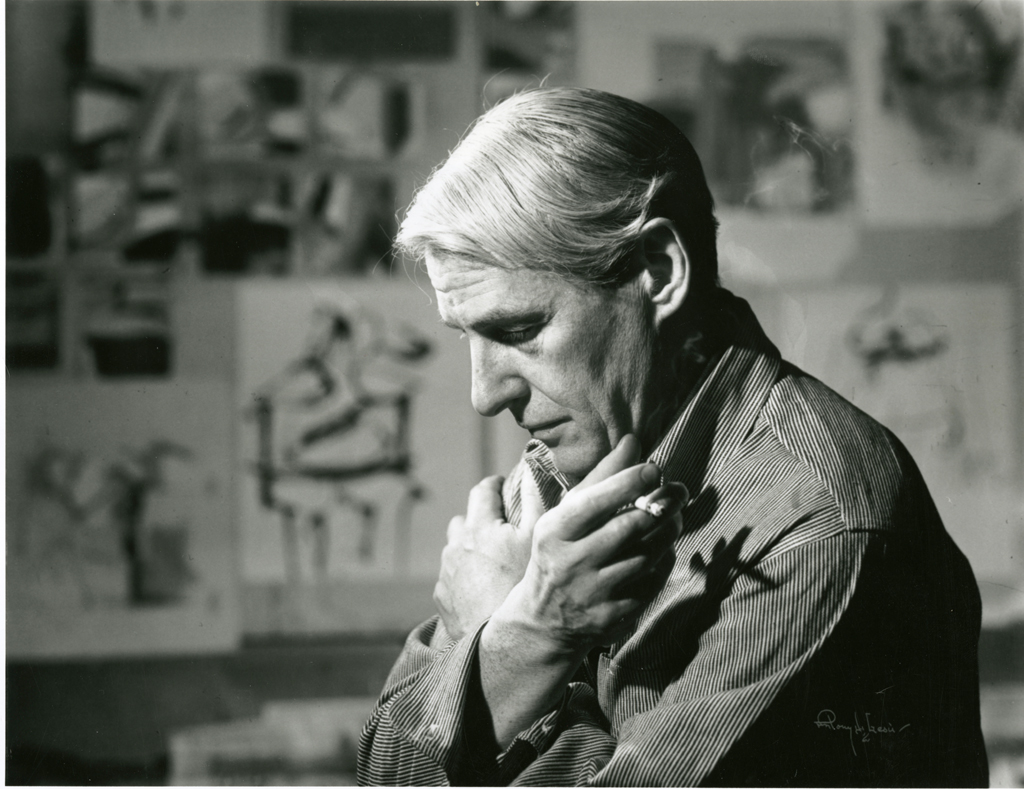
Willem de Kooning in 1961.

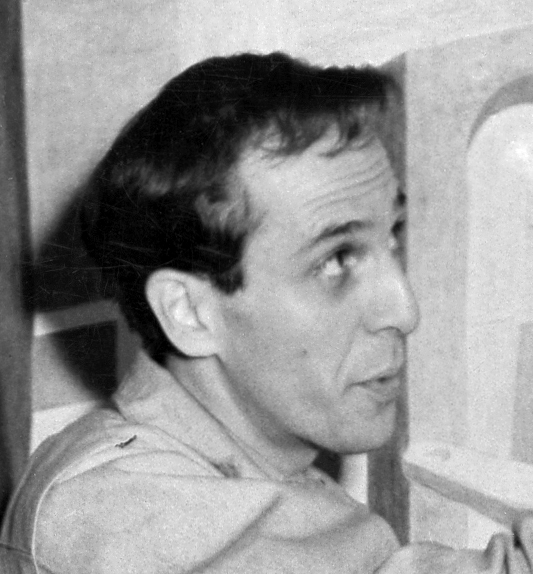
Painter Philip Guston in 1940.

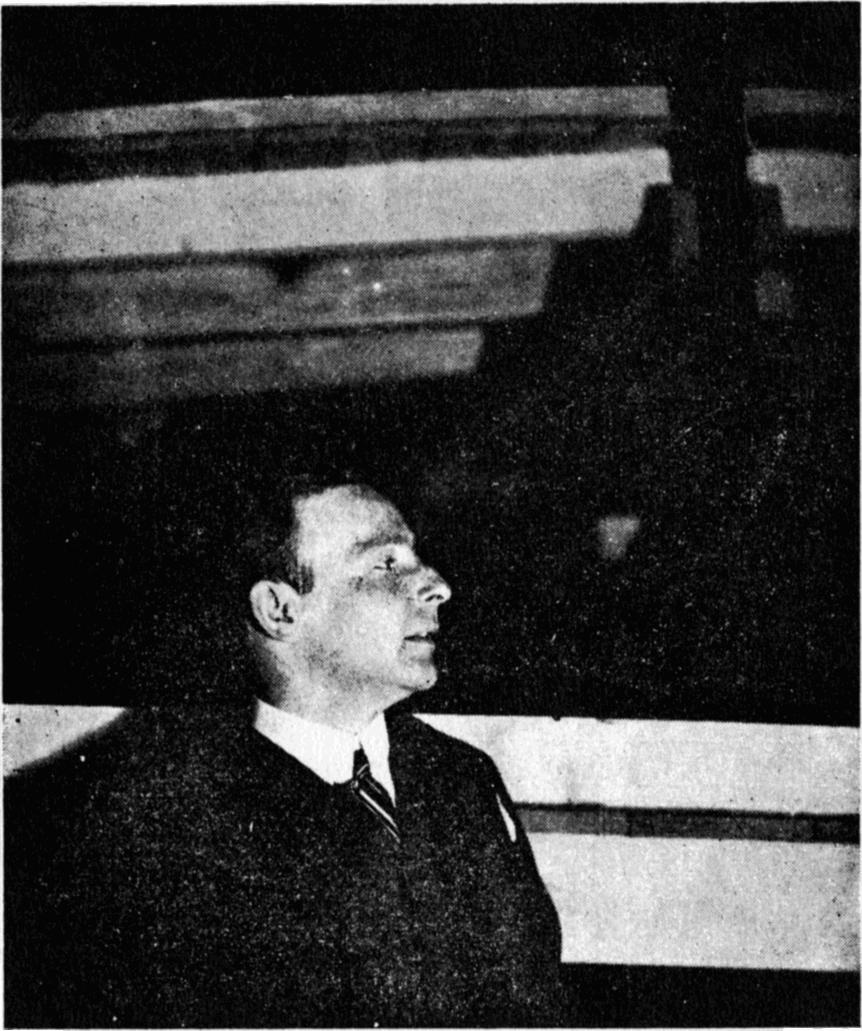
Sculptor Frederick John Kiesler in 1924.

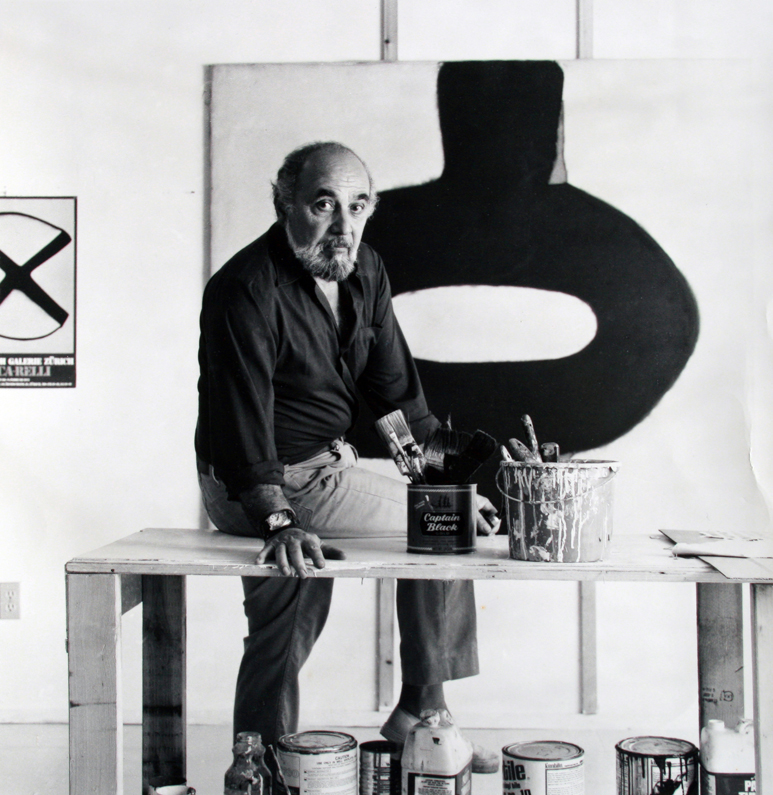
Painter Conrad Marca-Relli in 1982.

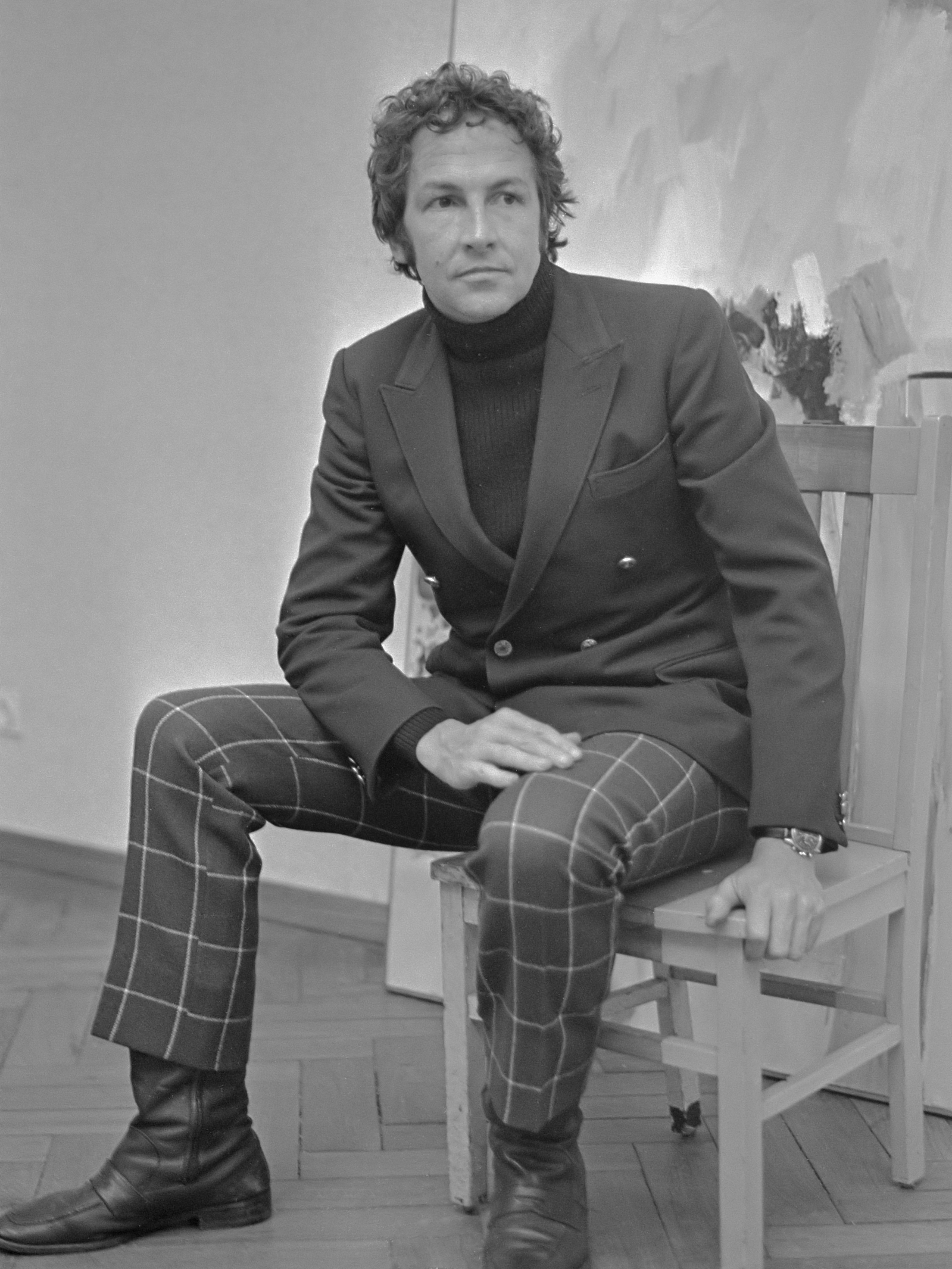
Graphic artist Robert Rauschenberg in 1968.

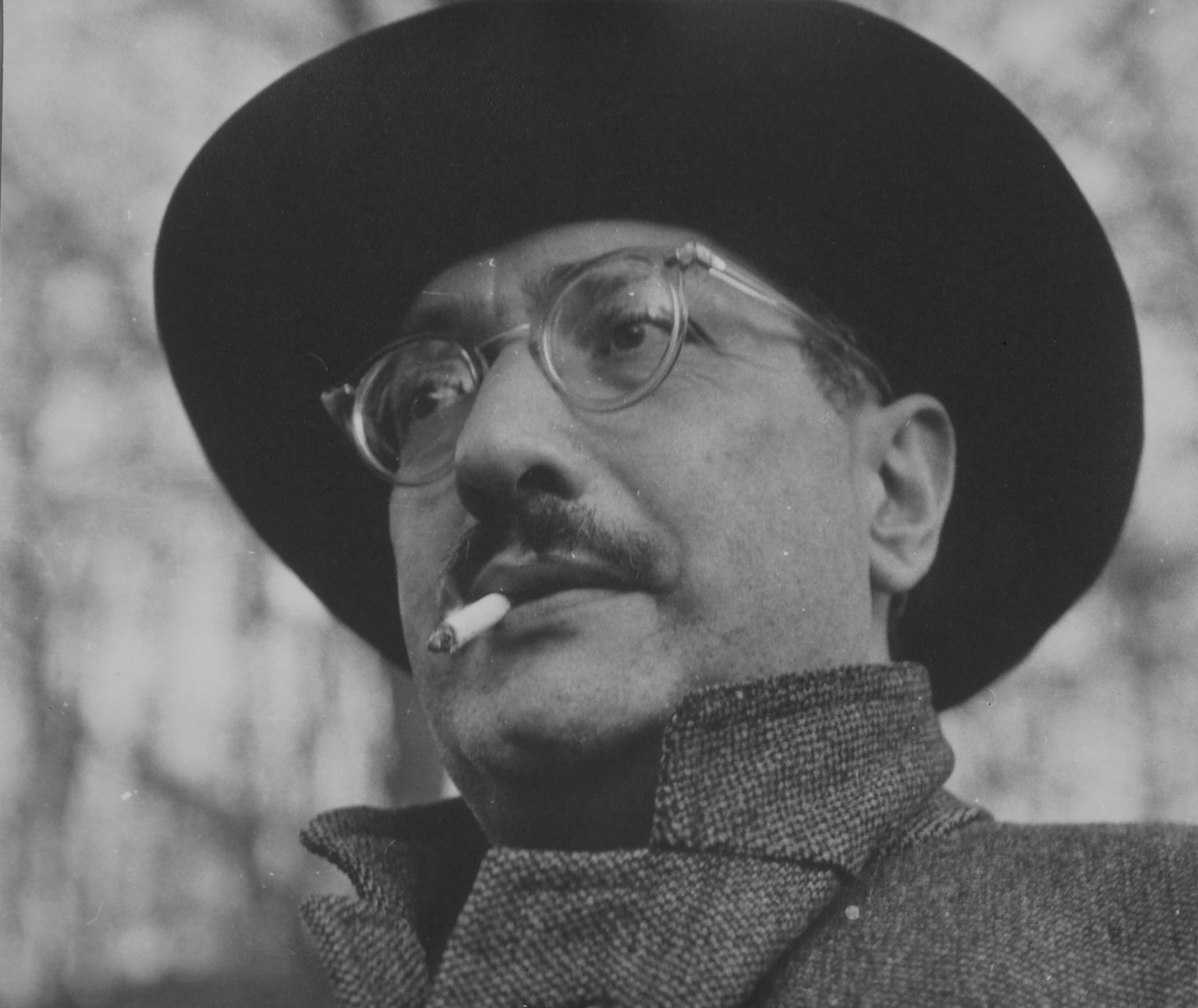
Painter Mark Rothko in the 1940s.

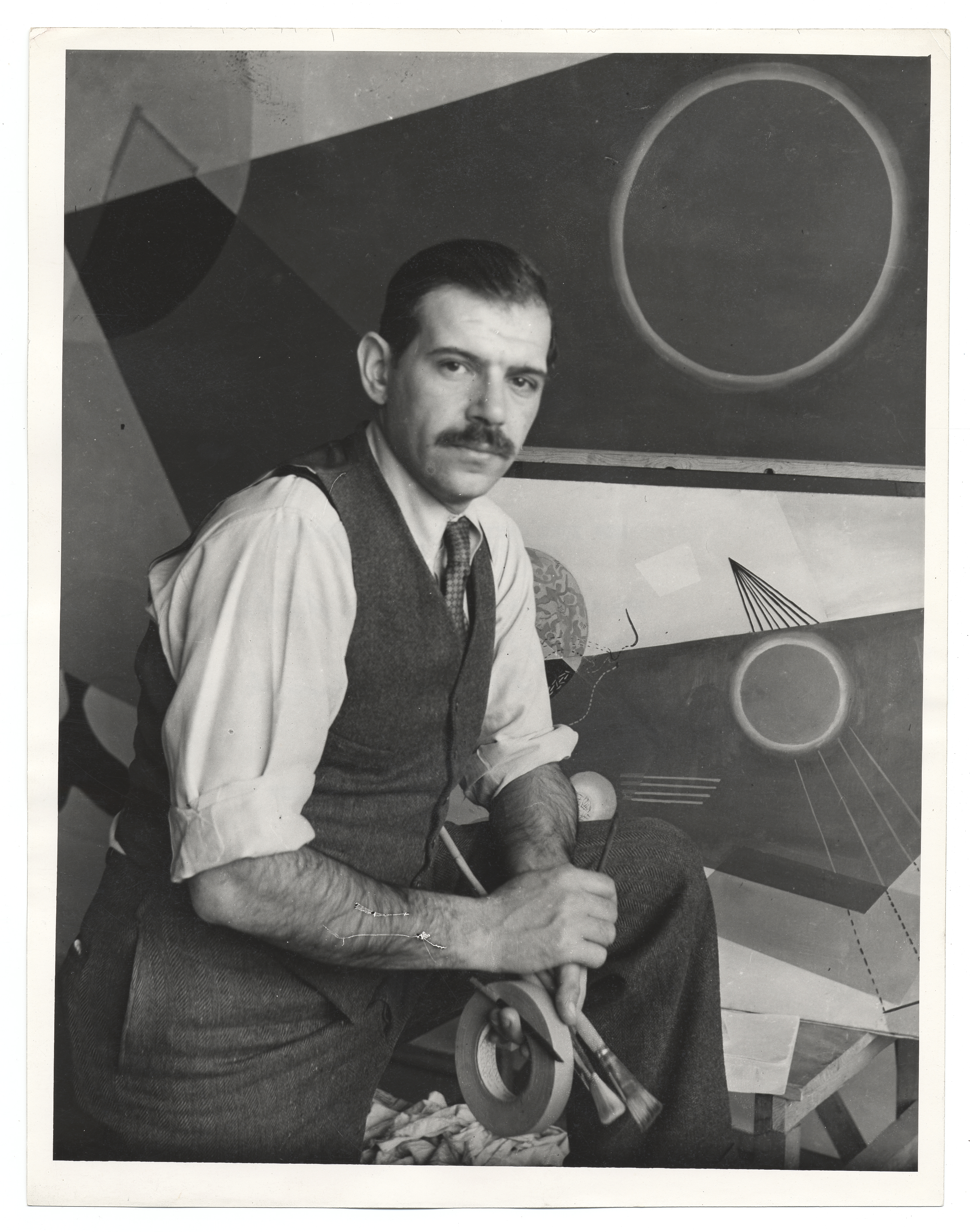
Painter Louis Schanker in 1939.

=== Exhibition funding and formal roles ===
"[R]ent for the decrepit [exhibition] space for the entire length of the show was only $70."Arts journalist Philip Barcio explains."But nearly everyone involved in the show was broke, and some were literally starving. [Future art dealer Leo] Castelli covered the bill, and the artists did all of the work to renovate ... the basement and first floor of a condemned building at 60 East 9th Street." Castelli, in his first curatorial effort, six years before he opened the gallery that made him famous, also hung the show. It was said he was selected because he was popular, and many of the artists thought he would hang their work impartially, but he also "paid for most of the expenses."

Artist Franz Kline designed and created the promotional materials, including the poster that gave the show its official name. During the event, Aaron Siskind, also a New York School "member," documented the exhibit with photographs. Afterward, "[t]he artists celebrated not only the appearance of the dealers, collectors and museum people on the 9th Street, and the consequent exposure of their work," Altshuler writes, "but they celebrated the creation and the strength of a living community."

== Legacy ==
=== American art ===
Critical response after the Ninth Street Show encouraged and helped define early abstract expressionism, while also promoting it. Critic Harold Rosenberg's "famous 1952 essay, 'The American Action Painters,' [which] effectively likened artists such as Willem de Kooning and Franz Kline to heroic existentialists wrestling with self-expression" is one good example. But praise from critics like the make-or-break "[Clement] Greenberg ... collectors like Peggy Guggenheim, and curators like MoMA’s Alfred H Barr ... [also helped] abstract expressionism eventually gain momentum among the art glitterati of New York in the 1950s, despite never being popular among the wider American public." It was Greenberg, in fact, who claimed that "for the first time ever, the most 'advanced' form of Western art was no longer being produced in Europe but instead in New York. For him, it was painters like Pollock, Motherwell, De Kooning, Rothko, Kline, and Newman that were now, thanks to the new abstract languages they were developing, carrying on the work that had begun with the European avant-gardes."

A less enthusiastic public, however, meant that few local galleries mounted shows featuring members of the group. The Stable Gallery, a converted horse stable, located at 924 7th Avenue and 58th Street in Manhattan, was an exception, and as host of the New York Painting and Sculpture Annuals from 1953–57, it exhibited some of the "Ninth Street Show" artists.

The poster for the second New York Painting and Sculpture Annual, also held at The Stable Gallery in 1953, included an introduction by critic Clement Greenberg, both crediting and praising the Ninth Street Show for setting a precedent for showing more daring work because the show was conceived and organized by artists:

This exhibition was conceived and organized by artists, the event rightly to be considered the precedent for this one was the famous "Ninth Street" show held in the spring of 1951 on the ground floor of a vacated store, on East 9th St. Like this one, that exhibition was organized, and its participants named and invited, by artists themselves, and a range of the liveliest tendencies within the mainstream of advanced painting and sculpture was presented. I don't think the reverberations of that show have died away yet..."

=== Women artists ===
Sixty-one men and eleven women participated in the Ninth Street Art Exhibition. "Five of the women went on to have international careers, their work collected by major museums and subject to ever-expanding bibliographies: Grace Hartigan, Helen Frankenthaler, Joan Mitchell, Elaine de Kooning (who was married to Willem), and [Lee] Krasner—the oldest of them but the last to bloom, coming into her own only after Pollock’s death, in 1956, a painful loss yet the start of a remarkably productive twenty-eight years of widowhood." In 2018, author Mary Gabriel published a collective biography of them, their work and their underacknowledged contributions to American art in the acclaimed Ninth Street Women: Lee Krasner, Elaine de Kooning, Grace Hartigan, Joan Mitchell, and Helen Frankenthaler: Five Painters and the Movement That Changed Modern Art. The best-selling book ignited interest in the underappreciated women of abstract expressionism and in women artists, generally.

In 2019, The Hollywood Reporter reported that Amazon Studios had optioned Gabriel's book for Amy Sherman-Palladino and Daniel Palladino to develop into a series.

The University of California, Los Angeles (UCLA) developed an art history class called "Ninth Street Women: The Women of Abstract Expressionism," which assigned Gabriel's book.

=== Related exhibitions ===
- In 2006, New York City's Findlay Fine Art Gallery had an exhibition honoring the exhibition's lesser-known artists.
- In 2016, the Denver Art Museum opened "Women of Abstract Expressionism," featuring more than 50 major paintings by 1940s and 1950s women of abstract expressionism.
- In 2016, Hauser Wirth & Schimmel, a gallery in Los Angeles, made its debut with “Revolution in the Making: Abstract Sculpture by Women, 1947–2016.” In a review of the Denver show, Hyperallergic's Yasmeen Siddiqui notes that "Women of Abstract Expressionism" Challenges the Canon But Is Only the Beginning.
