= Bradley Walker Tomlin =

American painter (1899–1953)

- Born: August 19, 1899; Syracuse, NY
- Died: May 11, 1953 (aged 53); St. Vincent’s Hospital, New York City
- Occupation: Abstract expressionist painter.

Bradley Walker Tomlin (August 19, 1899 – May 11, 1953) belonged to the generation of New York School Abstract Expressionist artists. He participated in the famous ‘’Ninth Street Show.’’ According to John I. H. Baur, Curator of the Whitney Museum of American Art, Tomlin’s "life and his work were marked by a persistent, restless striving toward perfection, in a truly classical sense of the word, towards that “inner logic” of form which would produce a total harmony, an unalterable rightness, a sense of miraculous completion...It was only during the last five years of his life that the goal was fully reached, and his art flowered with a sure strength and authority."

== Biography ==
Born in Syracuse, New York, Tomlin was the youngest of four children. Beginning in high school he wanted to be an artist. His art teachers were Cornelia Moses, a former pupil of Arthur Wesley Dow, Hugo Gari Wagner for modeling, and Frank London, his mentor and teacher.

Tomlin attended Syracuse University, College of Fine Arts, New York from 1917-1921, studying under Dr. Jeannette Scott and Professor Carl T. Hawley. He then attended Académie Colarossi and the Grande Chaumiѐre, in Paris from 1923–1924. Tomlin returned to New York in the late 1924. In 1925, he began exhibiting at the Whitney Studio Club. Later in 1926, Tomlin returned to Europe, visiting England, Italy and Switzerland, though staying mainly in Paris. He returned to the United States in July 1927. He also discovered Woodstock, New York where he spent his summers.

During the depression Tomlin worked in teaching positions at Sarah Lawrence College from 1932 - 1941, at Buckley School from 1932–1933, and at Dalton School from 1933–1934.

On Sunday, May 10, 1953, Tomlin drove with his friends to a party at the Jackson Pollocks’ house on Long Island, from which he returned about midnight, feeling ill. The following day, he was admitted to St. Vincent's Hospital where he suffered a heart attack and died at seven that night. Bradley Walker Tomlin died at the age of fifty-three.

== Selected solo exhibitions ==
- 1922: Skaneatele and Cazenovia, NY (watercolors)
- 1925: Anderson Galleries, NY (watercolors)
- 1926, 1927: Montross Gallery, NY
- 1931, 1944: Frank K. M. Rehn Galleries, NY
- 1950, 1953: Betty Parsons Gallery, NY
- 1955: Phillips Memorial Gallery, Washington, D.C.
- 1957: “Bradley Walker Tomlin,” circ. Exhibition organized by the Art Galleries of the University of California, Los Angeles, in association with the Whitney Museum of American Art’’
- 2016: "Bradley Walker Tomlin: A Retrospective", Samuel Dorsky Museum of Art, August 31 – December 11, 2016, State University of New York at New Paltz

== Selected group exhibitions ==
- 1949, 1951: University of Illinois
- 1951: 9th Street Art Exhibition, NYC
- 1951: “Abstract Painting and Sculpture in America,” Museum of Modern Art New York; University of Minnesota, Minneapolis MN
- 1952: “Fifteen Americans,” Museum of Modern Art, New York;
- 1953: Metropolitan Museum of Art, NYC; “Second Annual Exhibition of Painting and Sculpture Stable Gallery,” NYC
- 1954-1955: “The New Decade,” Whitney Museum of American Art, NYC
- 1955: Musée d’Art Moderne Paris, France
- 1969: “New American Painting and Sculpture,” Museum of Modern Art, New York
- 2017: "Abstract Expressionnism", Guggenheim Museum Bilbao, Feb. - June 2017

== See also ==
- Art movement
- Abstract Imagists
- Abstract expressionism
- New York School
- Action painting

== Books ==
- Marika Herskovic, American Abstract Expressionism of the 1950s An Illustrated Survey, (New York School Press, 2003.) ISBN 0-9677994-1-4. p. 338-341
- Marika Herskovic, New York School Abstract Expressionists Artists Choice by Artists, (New York School Press, 2000.) ISBN 0-9677994-0-6. p. 16; p. 38; p. 362-365
- Müller-Yao, Marguerite Hui: Der Einfluß der Kunst der chinesischen Kalligraphie auf die westliche informelle Malerei, Diss. Bonn, Köln 1985. ISBN 3-88375-051-4
