= List of United States post office murals in West Virginia =

The following is a list of United States post office murals created in West Virginia between 1934 and 1943.

Location	Mural title	Image	Artist	Date	Notes	NRHPlisted
Elkins	Forest Service		Stevan Dohanos	1939	tempura	
Elkins	Mining Village		Stevan Dohanos	1939	tempura	
Fayetteville	The Moners		Nixford Baldwin	1939	oil on canvas	
Holidays Cove	Captain Bilderbrook's and John Schoolcraft's Expedition from Holidays Cove to Fort Wheeling in 1777		Charles Chapman	1940		
Lewisburg	Old Time Camp Meeting		Robert Franklin Gates	1940	tempura	
Mannington	West Virginia Landscape		Richard Zoellner	1942	oil on canvas; winner of the 48-State Mural Competition	
Marlinton	Mill Point		Edwin Dorsey Doniphan	1939	oil on canvas	
Marlinton	Past Visions the Future		Edwin Dorsey Doniphan	1939	oil on canvas	
Mount Hope	Mining		Michael Lensen	1942	oil on canvas	
St. Marys	St. Mary's and the Industries of the Region		Alexander B. Clayton	1939	oil on canvas	
Salem	Visions of the Development of Salem		Berni Glasgow	1942	oil on canvas	
