= Earl Kerkam =

American painter

- Born: October 7, 1891; Washington, D.C.
- Died: January 12, 1965 (aged 73); New York City
- Known for: Painting
- Movement: Abstract expressionism; New York Figurative Expressionism

Earl Cavis Kerkam (1891– 1965) was an American painter. According to Willem de Kooning, Philip Guston, Mark Rothko, George Spaventa and Esteban Vicente, he “was one of the finest painters to come out of America.” Gerald Norland wrote at the Earl Kerkam Memorial Exhibition in 1966:

”A painter of enormous poetic awareness, self-directed, almost totally without direct influence, he stands as an original American artist in the best sense.”

Earl Kerkam painted and lived in Paris, France in the early 1950s. There, Kerkam developed a mentor and collegial relationship with the artist Norman Carton which extended through their returns to New York City, the 1955 Whitney Annual and Poindexter Gallery exhibition, and their solo exhibits at World House in the 1960s.

Earl Kerkam died on January 12, 1965, in New York City.

== Selected solo exhibitions ==
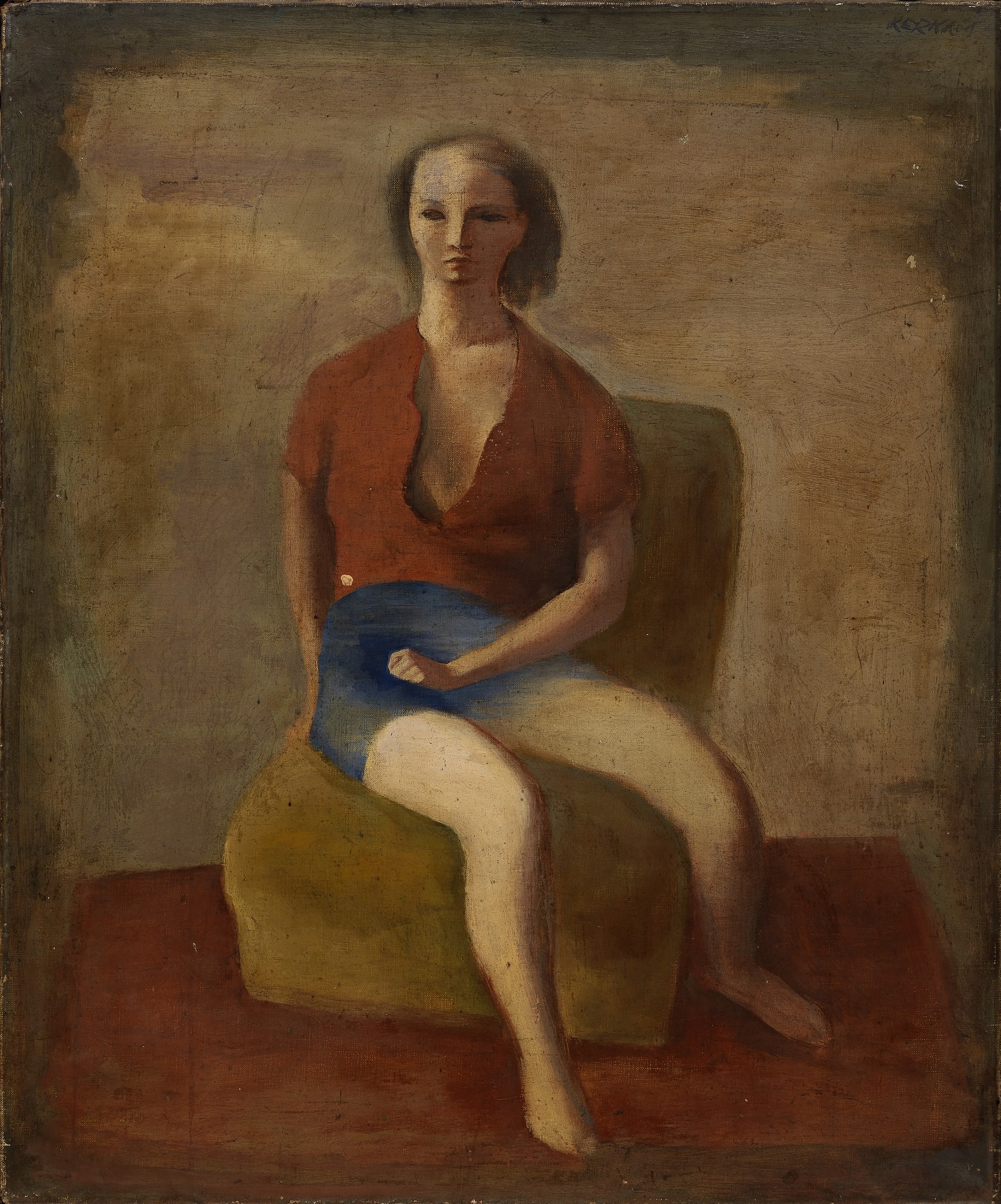
Roslyn, easel painting for the Federal Art Project in New York City

- 1933 (first) and the 1930s: Contemporary Arts Gallery, New York City; Babcock Gallery, New York City; J.B. Newmann Gallery, NY;
- 1940, 1942, 1943, 1944: Bonestell Gallery, NY;
- 1946, 1948, 1952, 1953, 1955: Charles Egan Gallery, New York City
- 1947-1949: Harold Wacker’s Chinese Gallery;
- 1955, 1956: Poindexter Gallery, New York City;
- 1960, 1961, 1963: World House Gallery, New York City;
- 1964: B.C. Holland Gallery, Chicago, Illinois;

== Selected group exhibitions ==
- 1951, 1953-1957: Ninth Street Show, and Stable Gallery Annuals, New York City;
- 1949, 1955: The Whitney Museum of American Art, Annuals and Biennials, New York City.

== Public collections ==
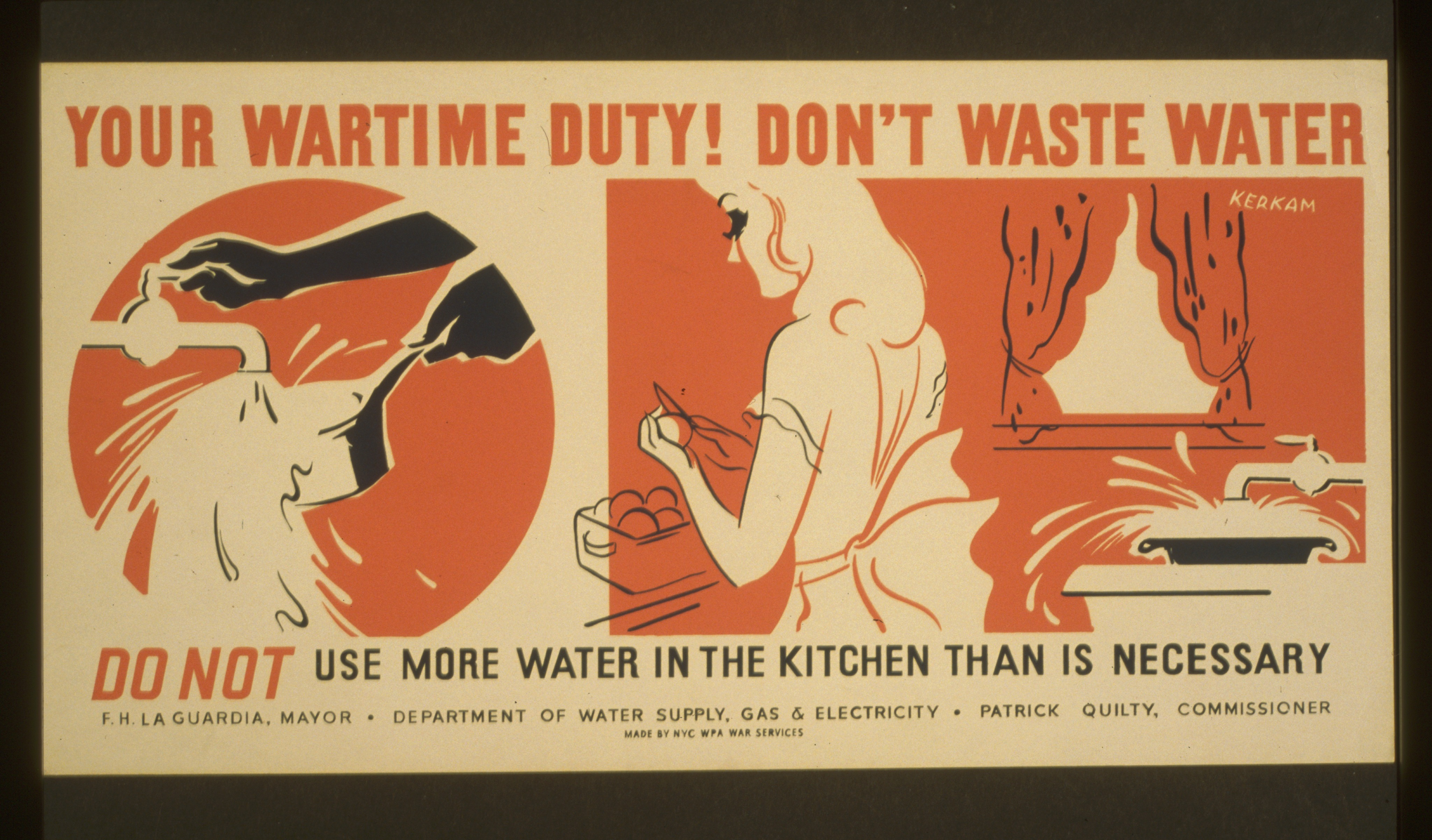
Wartime conservation poster designed for the Federal Art Project in New York City

- Metropolitan Museum of Art, New York City, New York
- Brooklyn Museum, Brooklyn, New York
- Kresge Art Museum at Michigan State University, East Lansing, Michigan
- San Francisco Museum of Modern Art (SFMOMA), San Francisco, California
- Smithsonian American Art Museum (SAAM), Washington, D.C.
- Weatherspoon Art Museum, University of North Carolina, Greensboro, North Carolina
- Museum of Art and Archaeology at University of Missouri, Missouri, Missouri

== See also ==
- Art movement
- Abstract expressionism
- Action painting
- New York School
- Expressionism
- Ninth Street Show
