= Nuhfer =

Nuhfer is a surname. Notable people with the surname include:

- Grace Nuhfer (born 2002), American Paralympic swimmer
- Heather Nuhfer (born 1982), American comic book writer
- Olive Nuhfer (1901–1996), American painter
