= John Stephan =

American painter

John Walter Stephan
- Circle number #5 by John Stephan
- Born: December 29, 1906; Chicago
- Died: July 1, 1995 (aged 88)
- Known for: Oil painting, Mural
- Movement: Abstract Expressionism
- Spouse: Ruth Walgreen Stephan Dart

John Walter Stephan (1906–1995) was an American painter in the Hard-edge style. His magazine The Tigers Eye was widely read and is considered a lastingly influential magazine of art and literature. He was a contemporary and friends with such notable artists as Mark Rothko, Clyfford Still and William Baziotes

== Early life ==
John Stephan was born in Maywood, Illinois to a father who was a dentist and a mother who was a nurse, and his family moved to Chicago in 1917 he attended the University of Illinois and later the School of the Art Institute of Chicago.

== Career ==
After attending the School of the Art Institute of Chicago he worked as an Art Instructor at Jane Addams Hull House, in Chicago and later was a Draftsman, at Western Electric in Chicago. His first solo exhibition was in 1931 with many other solo and group exhibitions of note.

== Personal life ==
He was married to Ruth Walgreen, then Ruth Stephan, who was the daughter of Walgreens founder Charles Rudolph Walgreen.

== Notable exhibitions ==
- 9th Street Art Exhibition

== Notable collections ==
- Yale University Art Gallery
- Smithsonian American Art Museum
- Museum of Fine Arts, Boston
- Rose Art Museum
