= Perle Fine =

American Abstract expressionist painter (1905–1988)

- Born: 1905; Boston, Massachusetts
- Died: 1988 (aged 82–83); East Hampton, New York
- Known for: Painting
- Movement: Abstract expressionism

Perle Fine (born Poule Feine; 1905–1988) was an American abstract expressionist painter. Fine's work was most known by its combination of fluid and brushy rendering of the materials and the use of biomorphic forms encased and intertwined with irregular geometric shapes.

== Biography ==
One of six children, Fine was born in Boston, Massachusetts, in 1905, to parents who had recently immigrated from Russia. She became interested in art at a young age. "Starting almost immediately in grammar school at the time of the First World War... I did posters and started winning little prizes and getting encouragement that way. So that by the time I graduated from high school I knew very well I wanted to be an artist." Fine briefly went to the School of Practical Art in Boston, where she took classes in illustration and graphic design and learned to design newspaper advertisements. She paid for her studies by working in the school's bursar's office. Subsequently, she moved to New York City to pursue training in fine art and began attending the Grand Central School of Art. It was at the Grand Central School of Art where Fine met Maurice Berezov, whom she married in 1930.

While in New York, she also studied at the Art Students League with Kimon Nicolades. In the late 1930s she began to study with Hans Hofmann in New York City as well as in Provincetown. In 1943 she received a grant from the Guggenheim Foundation and was able to participate in exhibitions at Peggy Guggenheim's Art of this Century Gallery and the Museum of Nonobjective Painting; these shows brought her significant press attention. In 1945, Fine joined American Abstract Artists, where she found community and support for her artistic ideas. "By the mid 1940s, Fine had work in the collections of Frank Lloyd Wright and Frank Crowninshield... her art was also owned by Alfred Barr, director of the Museum of Modern Art, and Emily Hall and Burton Tremaine, the modern art collectors from Connecticut." Emily Hall Tremaine would later commission Fine to create two interpretations of Piet Mondrian's unfinished painting Victory Boogie Woogie.

Fine ran the East River Gallery on East 57th Street from 1936 to 1938, and opened her own gallery in 1940. In 1945, she had her first solo exhibit at the Willard Gallery on East 57th Street. In 1946, Fine accepted an offer to work for Karl Nienrendorf, whose gallery was across the street from the Willard Gallery; it was at this gallery that Fine received a subsidy that enabled her to paint full-time.

During a show at the Nienrendorf Gallery, art critic Edward Alden Jewell, who had previously dismissed abstraction when it first came out in the 1930s by calling it decorative and imitative of European avant-garde, praised Fine's "aplomb" and "native resourcefulness".

In 1947, Fine was featured in an issue of The New Iconograph which showcased nonobjective art and theory. It was written that, even though she was a member of American Abstract Artists, her work was different in spirit than that of fellow-members Ralston Crawford and Robert Motherwell.

In 1950 she was admitted to the 8th Street "Artists' Club", having been nominated by Willem de Kooning. "Beginning in the mid-1950s, Fine's expressionist style began to loosen. She produced thick, heavily painted abstractions using harsh, jagged strokes with a loaded brush. Her focus was the two-dimensional plane: surface, texture and medium. Fine's palette in these often large-scale pieces was one of much more somber tones."

Fine was chosen by her fellow artists to participate in the Ninth Street Show held from May 21 – June 10, 1951. The show was located at 60 East 9th Street on the first floor and in the basement of a building which was about to be demolished. According to Bruce Altshuler:

The artists celebrated not only the appearance of the dealers, collectors and museum people on the 9th Street, and the consequent exposure of their work, but they celebrated the creation and the strength of a living community of significant dimensions.

Starting with the Ninth Street Show, Fine participated in each of the invitational New York Painting and Sculpture Annuals from 1951 to 1957. She was one of just 24 out of a total 256 New York School artists who was included in all the Annuals. These Annuals were important because the participants were chosen by the artists themselves. Other women artists who took part in all the shows were Elaine de Kooning, Grace Hartigan, and Joan Mitchell.

In the 1950s, Fine moved to the Springs section of East Hampton on the eastern end of Long Island, where Jackson Pollock, Lee Krasner, Willem de Kooning, Conrad Marca-Relli, John Ferren, and other members of the New York School found permanent residence.

At a 1958 exhibition, her paintings offered "abstract intimations of nature... This perception was reinforced by Fine's inclusion in Nature in Abstraction: The Relation of Abstract Painting and Sculpture to Nature in Twentieth-Century American Art."

The 1960s marked her re-entry into a profoundly changed New York art scene, in which she encountered more galleries and new art styles. "Fine had 4 solo shows at the Graham Gallery (1961, 1963, 1964, 1967) with a major shift in her style, with a reintroduction of horizontals and verticals, announced Fine's intention to convey... 'an emotion about color'." Fine began to teach in 1961, as a visiting critic and lecturer at Cornell University. Soon after, Hofstra University approached her with an offer; she taught there privately from 1962 to 1973.

Fine stated the following:

I never thought of myself as a student or teacher, but as a painter. When I paint something I am very much aware of the future. If I feel something will not stand up 40 years from now, I am not interested in doing that kind of thing.

In 1965, she developed a severe case of mononucleosis. Around this time, she took up making wood collages, employing curvilinear forms. Fine went on to win an award at the annual Guild Hall Artist Members' Exhibition in 1978.

After several years' struggle with Alzheimer's disease, Fine died of pneumonia on May 31, 1988, at the age of 83 in East Hampton, New York.

== The Prescience series: 1950s ==
During the 1950s, Fine was inspired by the ideas of Hans Hofmann and the harmony and tension of combining color and shape. Fine was able to evolve using color as its own means of expression. Fine started playing with act of staining and contrasting levels of translucency along with the use of reduction and of positive and negative space. Her works of this period bear a similarity to those of Mark Rothko, of whom she was a close friend at the time. This series of her work was known for its breadth and openness, and for the subtle layering of colors and the way the materials interacted.

== The Cool series: 1961–1963 ==
Her Cool series of 1961–1963 represented a break away from the Abstract Expressionist works of her earlier years. She stated that the paintings were a “growth” rather than a “departure”, developing from “a need within the painting to express more.”

The Cool series was created while Fine was living in isolation in the Springs of East Hampton. The name came from her awareness that the word “cool” had come to mean a new type of art during the time. Artists were stepping away from the soul-baring of action painting to let their images speak for themselves; this new approach was free from psychological self-examination, and could just involve the viewer in a direct emotional and intellectual experience. It was simply about how the viewer interacted with the color and space, creating a “visceral, spiritual experience” through these aspects alone. Fine's Cool series concentrated solely on the imagery of rectangles and squares placed in a juxtaposition using mostly monochromatic color pallets.

== The Accordment series: 1969–1980 ==
The Accordment series was the culmination of all Fine's previous styles. The series' name means "agreement" or "acceptance", and its works have a distinct connection with Minimalism. In her article "The Tranquil Power of Perle Fine's Art", Kathleen Housley says of Fine's work of this period: “Close in age and in temperament, Fine and Agnes Martin shared many similarities, one being that their art was routinely described by critics as 'atmospheric and classic'." Martin and Fine appeared together in a group show at the Whitney Museum in 1962 entitles Geometric Abstraction in America. Fine's style is set apart by her minimalist tendencies, using colorful line work, planes of color, and distinct sweeping brushstrokes.

Fine's work on this series overlapped with her tenure at Hofstra University, which lasted from 1962 to 1973. In 1978, toward the end of this period of her career, she was honored with an exhibition at Guild Hall Museum in East Hampton which emphasized work from this series. Curator David Dietcher described her Accordment series saying “bands of color produce luminosity that seems to emanate from within the grid itself”.

== Position as a female artist ==
Fine, along with other female artists such as Fannie Hillsmith and Lee Krasner, experienced significant constraints to their opportunities and exposure on the basis of their gender. "[T]he very image of the Abstract Expressionist painter was a white, heterosexual male... this movement, which perceived itself as a glyph of individual freedom, constricted the entry of women, African Americans, and homosexuals, regardless of the nature and quality of their work." The art world was run by individuals like Samuel Kootz, a prominent gallery owner who helped determine what art (and which artists) was mainstream, who openly declared that there would be no women artists in his gallery. Nonetheless, Fine maintained that "I know I was as good as anybody else in there".

Despite the obstruction of gatekeepers like Kootz, Fine participated in many solo and group shows during the late 1940s. The success she had at these exhibitions gave every indication that Fine was on the verge of success in the art world. However, she never achieved the level of commercial success enjoyed by some of her male peers. "As the 1950s dawned... there was little competition among artists either male or female, it was only when the door began to crack open [i.e., when real money became involved] that the gender of the artist began to play a more prominent role." Deirdre Robson has described that period, saying "the arts were gradually thought of less in terms of being part of the 'female' realm and more as an interest suitable for a hardheaded and successful businessman."

For her part, Fine did not ascribe as much significance to the role gender played in her relative success within the Abstract Expressionist movement, instead focusing more on the integrity of her paintings themselves. She always held that the important thing was the painting rather than her being a woman; any adversity she faced only pushed her to become the artist she would be. She battled with the canvas and solved problems in every piece. Her determination and talent were undeniable, and, as art historian Ann Eden Gibson has said, "by the early 1950s, Fine was right in the middle of Abstract Expressionism”.

Over a career in abstract painting that lasted more than 50 years, Fine continued to innovate and refused to borrow methods from other artists that could potentially allow critics to call her work derivative. For Fine, "Abstract Expressionism had never been a form of open rebellion against earlier styles, but rather a beautiful, unexplored country."

More recently, her work is being given renewed attention, including the 2016 exhibition Women of Abstract Expression at the Denver Art Museum; Women of Abstract Expressionism from the 9th Street Show at the Katonah Museum of Art; and Artistic License: Six Takes on the Guggenheim Collection.

In 2016 her work was included in the exhibition Women of Abstract Expressionism organized by the Denver Art Museum. In 2023 her work was included in the exhibition Action, Gesture, Paint: Women Artists and Global Abstraction 1940-1970 at the Whitechapel Gallery in London.

Fine's work is in the collection of the Brooklyn Museum the Solomon R. Guggenheim Museum, the National Gallery of Art, the Smithsonian American Art Museum, the Whitney Museum of American Art.

== Visual analysis ==
During the 1940s, Cézanne's work had a significant effect on Fine's development as an artist. She took into consideration the way he developed an order from nature and took control of the canvas; this enabled her to form images in their own space on the canvas. As she became a more well-known artist, Fine's work embodied the characteristics of Abstract Expressionism. She allowed her knowledge of modern European masters to help inspire her style as she explored the depths of human emotion and energy. Fine described modern and abstract art as an ability to execute when facing problems. To Fine, color was very important as a way to express emotion. Some of her works were more saturated to show emotion, contrasting with the use of muted color in other work; this shows her interest in “different spatial and emotional qualities”.

In Cool Series, Lisa N. Peters analyzes Fine's Untitled: a yellow rectangle is pushing into the foreground while in a deep dark brown/green rectangle sits farther in the background. Her brushstrokes also tend to display a variety of emotions, from crisp and clean lines to soft and airy strokes. She uses wet on wet paint to create a look of fluidity and draws the paint out to the outer edges; this gives a look of sunlight shining upon grass, with most of the content appearing on the outer edge to give it an environmental atmosphere. Some may say that Fine's work was a precursor for artist like Joan Mitchell and Helen Frankenthaler.

Because Fine was able to self-isolate in the Springs of East Hamptons, she was able to take inspiration from her natural surroundings. Although Fine was adamant that her works were solely based on the way her materials interacted, people felt that it was hard to not see the connections she made with her surrounding in Springs. Fine once stated, “For me reality exists in the aura of the unknown. The spell-binding quality, the one that beckons and holds, the unpremeditated, the nameless, touched off perhaps by some transcendental experience but guided by a poetic and creative mind – these are the things hidden beneath the surface”.

== See also ==
- Abstract expressionism
- Action painting
- New York School
- 9th Street Art Exhibition
