= Stevens Vaughn =

US artist

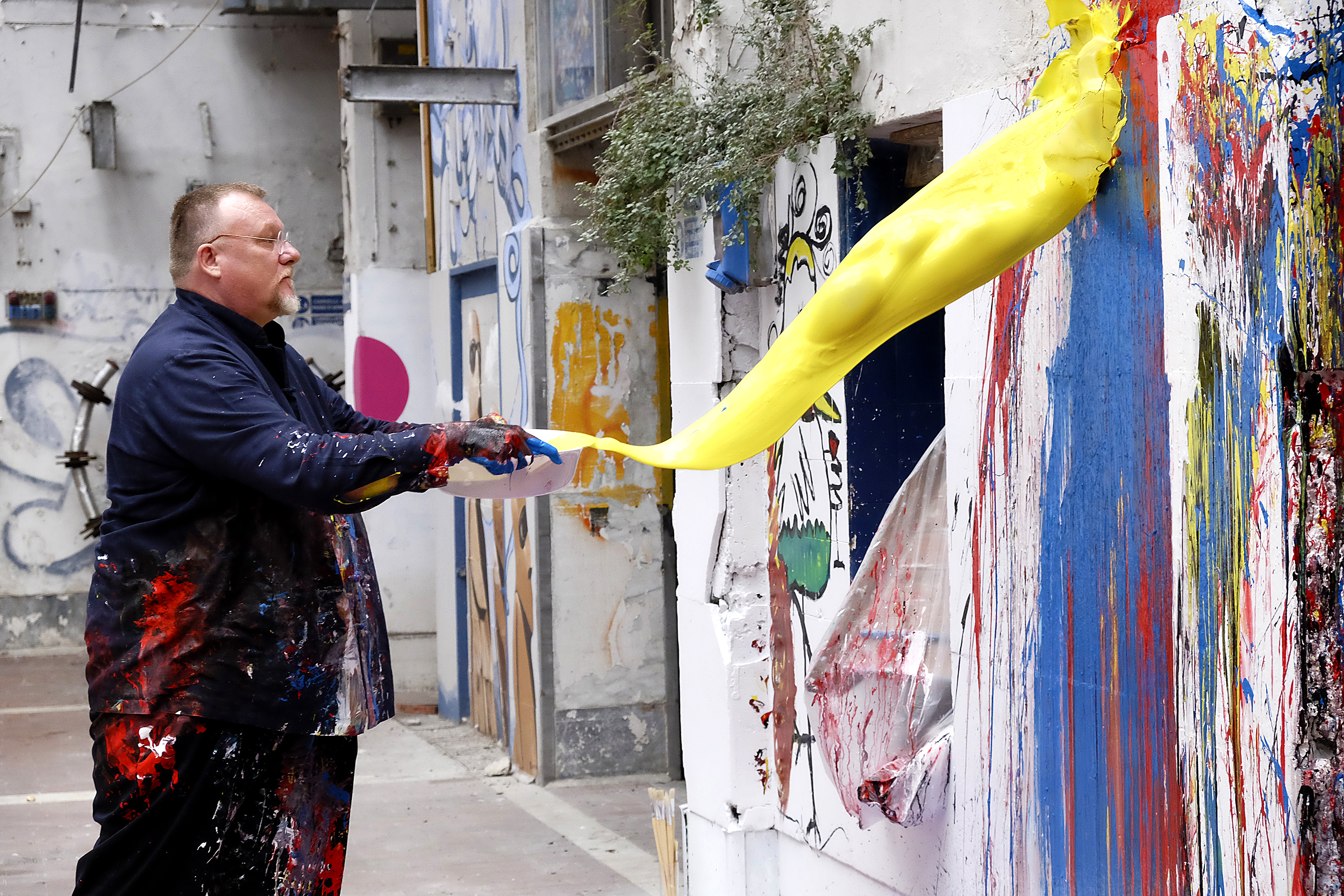
- at MAAM in Rome 2015.
- Born: Fairmont, Minnesota, US
- Occupations: Conceptual Artist, Ritualistic Painter, Ceramics Designer
- Known for: 'Calligraphy of Water' and 'Water is a Color' 'Terra Vita' 'Buffet of Emotions' 'The Sarcophagus for Queen Margrethe II' 'Primordial' "You are the Center of your world"
- Parent(s): Vince Vaughn and Joyce Anderson
- Website: www.stevensvaughn.com

Stevens Vaughn is an American sculptor and ritualistic water painter.

== Early life and Artistic Practice ==
Stevens Vaughn grew up on a cattle farm in Fairmont, Minnesota. In 1978, he was sent by the Peace Corps to the Philippines to work with tropical agriculture, beginning a life long relationship with anthropology and Asian art, history and mythology.

Vaughn established a career as a designer and sculptor in Asia and other parts of the world, opening studios in Taiwan, China; Sri Lanka; Mexico; Japan; and mainland China.During his 9 years based in Japan, he was influenced by Ma (negative space) and Shibui aesthetics as part of a non-dualistic conception of the world.

His art encourages dialogue, as he combines traditional media and techniques with ideas of contemporary human interactivity. His throw and drip water ink paintings are simultaneously performance events that highlight the flexibility inherent in raw creative materials that exist as part of a universe of natural forces. He has sculpted Guanyin heads in Red Star army uniforms in traditional Jingdezhen porcelain, and has established through particular works contemporary lines of descent from mythologies and ancient thought systems.

Part of his artistic approach can be described by referring to ideas of “playfulness” in context of the Northern Song and Tang Dynasty artistic construct called Yi Pin (逸品). Yi Pin is a holistic Daoist art and life philosophy Vaughn blended into his life as a ceramicist and performance painter in the time he was resident on the historical island of Gulangyu. Today, he creates in his studios in Dehua, Fujian, China, and Valparaíso, Chile. During Vaughn's years in Asia and Scandinavia, he was deeply influenced by Gutai and Fluxus ideas of spontaneity and collaborative experimentation.

In addition to his own art, he works collaboratively on specialized production techniques, most notably in his 14 year long collaboration with artist Bjørn Nørgaard (Denmark) as an advisor for the construction of the crystal sarcophagus for Margrethe II of Denmark and his Royal Highness, the Prince Consort.

His painting technique uses instability of water-based paint mediums to create images sensitive to the vibrancy and force of the world in interaction with sensory experience. His performance painting has been described as “a calligraphy of water.”.

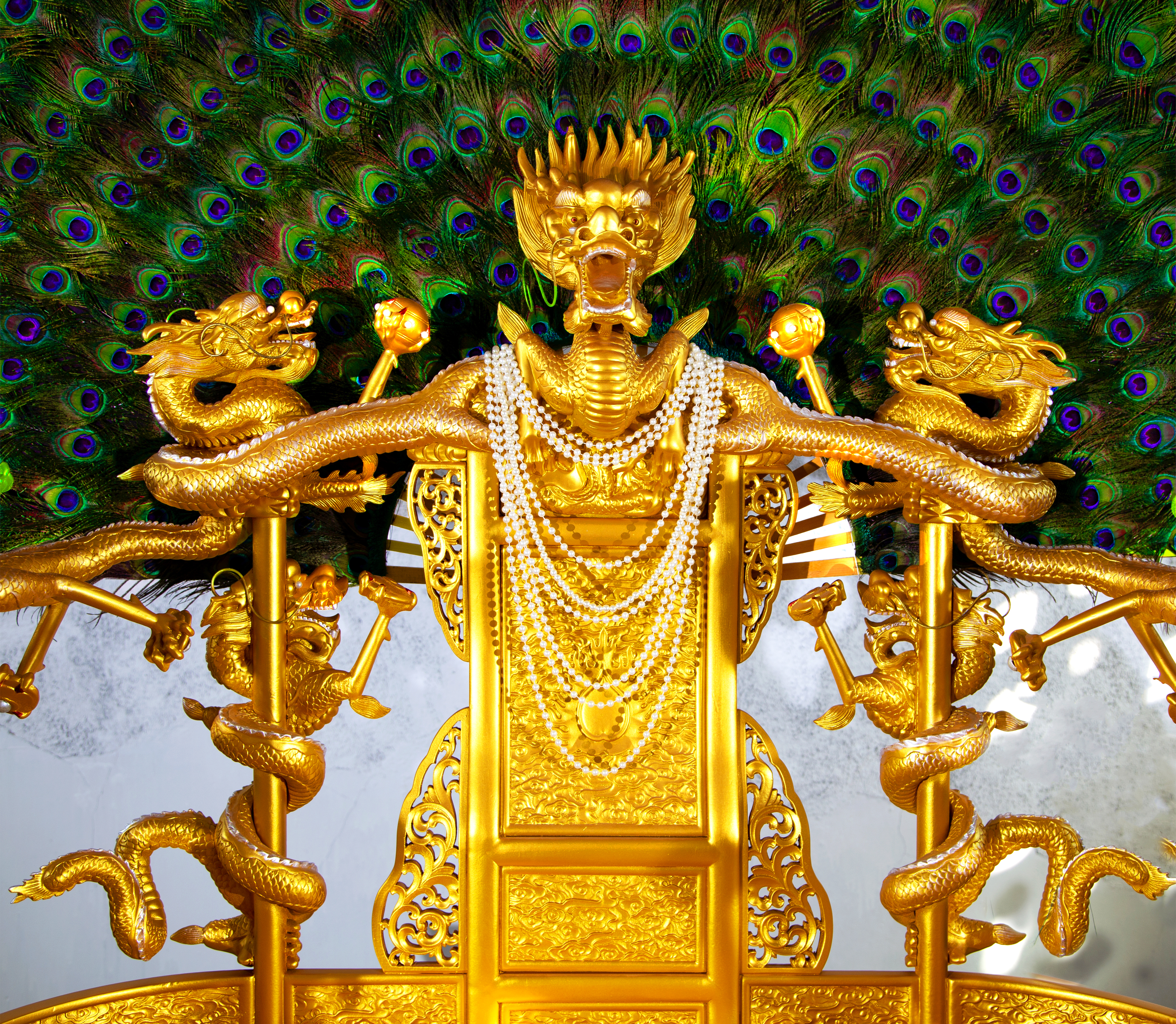
"You are the center of your world", Dragon Throne.

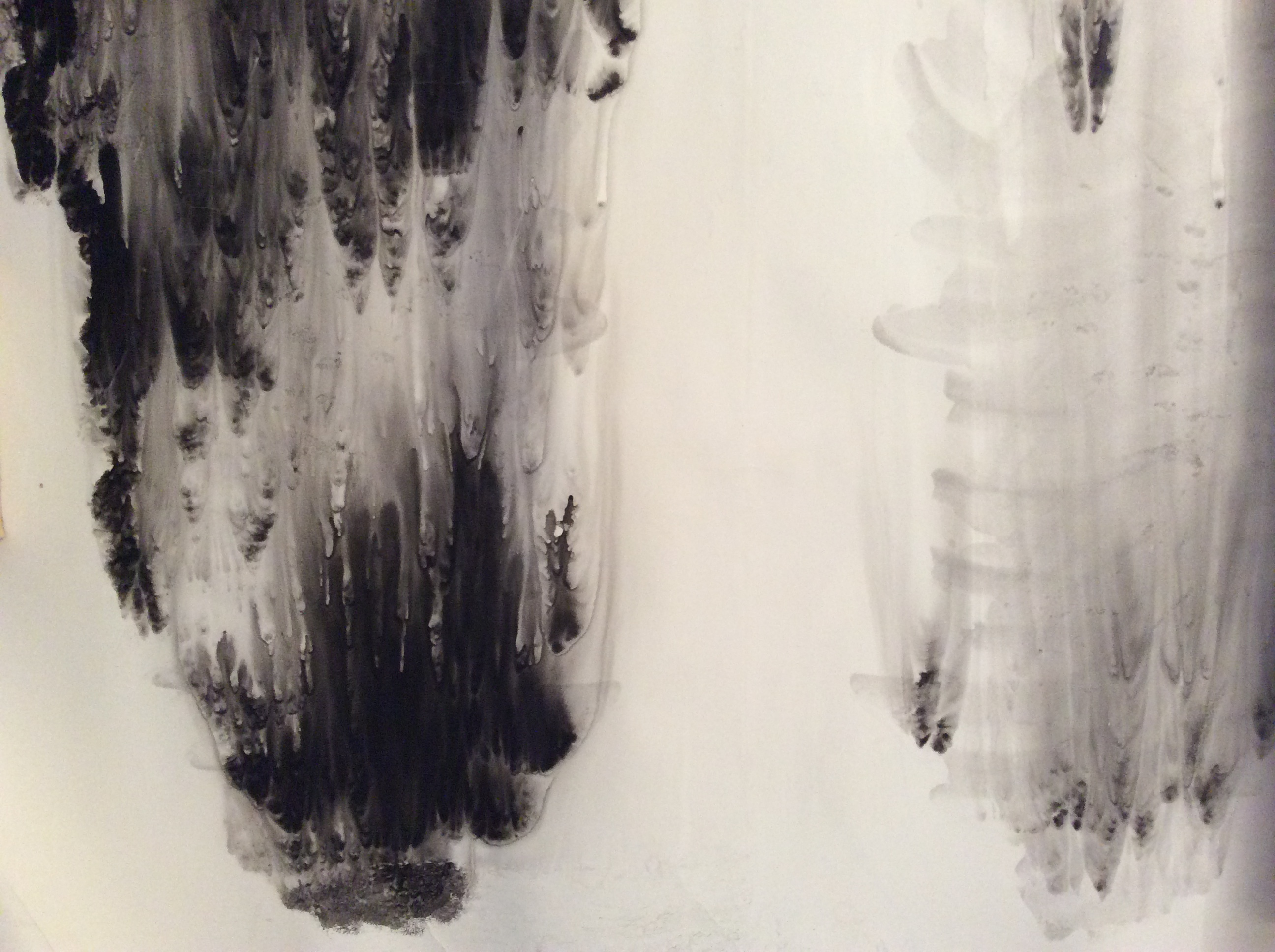
Stevens Vaughn, 'Invert Mountains'.

== Career ==
In 1984, Vaughn set up a glass sculpture and blowing studio in Hsinchu, Taiwan and designed media for retailers in the United States, including Neimen Marcus, Bloomingdale's and Gump's. During this time, he also designed products in Limoges, France and glasswork on the island of Murano, Italy.

In 1988, Vaughn was hired as Vice President of Fitz and Floyd and was sent to Japan to learn sculpting and ceramic painting techniques. It was here that he began to learn that "imperfection is essential to creating a state of perfection". Vaughn went on to develop ceramic and porcelain studios in Korea, Taiwan, Indonesia, and China. In 1991, he spent one year in Cuernevaca, Mexico, developing a porcelain studio based on what he learned in Asia and in 1992 he moved to Sri Lanka, in addition to continued residencies in China and Japan. In 1996, he moved permanently to the historic island of Gulangyu in Fujian, China where he played a major role in the development of porcelain art in the cities of Chaozhou and Dehua.

During this time, he collaborated with artist Bjørn Nørgaard (Denmark) as a technical adviser for the crystal sarcophagus of Margrethe II of Denmark and his Royal Highness the Prince Consort.

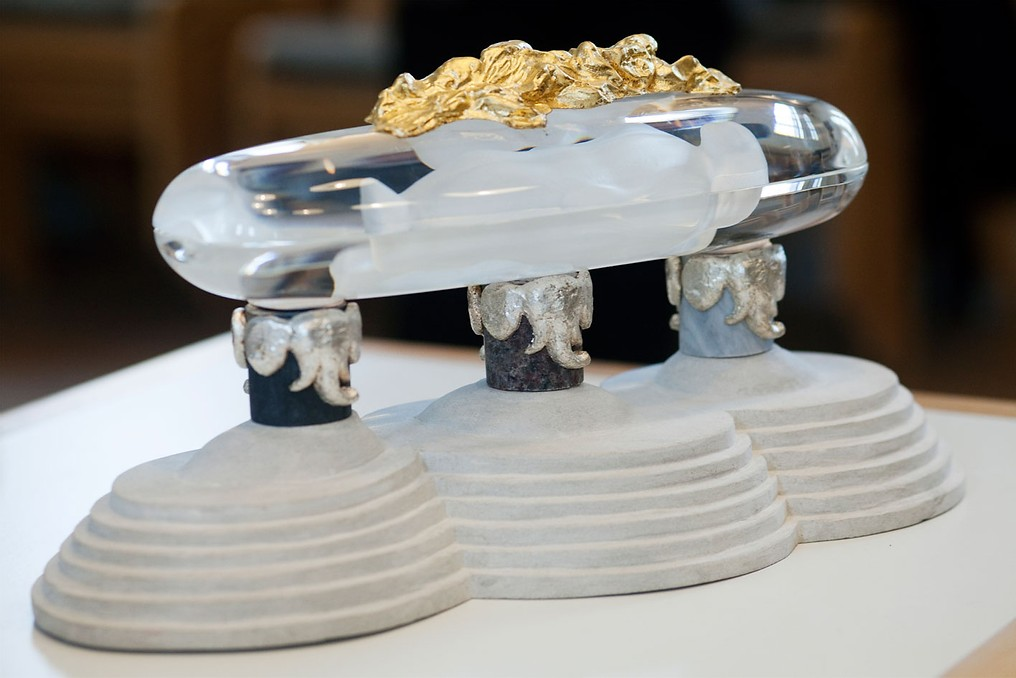
Model of the Sarcophagus for Queen Margrethe II of Denmark

While in China, Vaughn developed a technique of performance action painting. Vaughn's performance paintings are on display at the Chongqing LAB Art Museum, where he performed at its inauguration, in Shanghai at the Ke Art Museum and at MAAM in Rome. He has held solo exhibitions in Buenos Aires, Valparaíso, Curitiba, London, Berlin, Brazzaville, Bulgaria, Sofia, Miami, Rome and Shanghai, while his ceramic art sculptures have been exhibited in China, Scandinavia and South America.

Vaughn holds an adjunct professorship at the Ceramics Institute of Dehua and has lectured at the Central Academy of Fine Arts, Beijing. In 2006, he was appointed a professor in the Dieter Roth Academy in Gulangyu, China.

== Notable Art Pieces ==
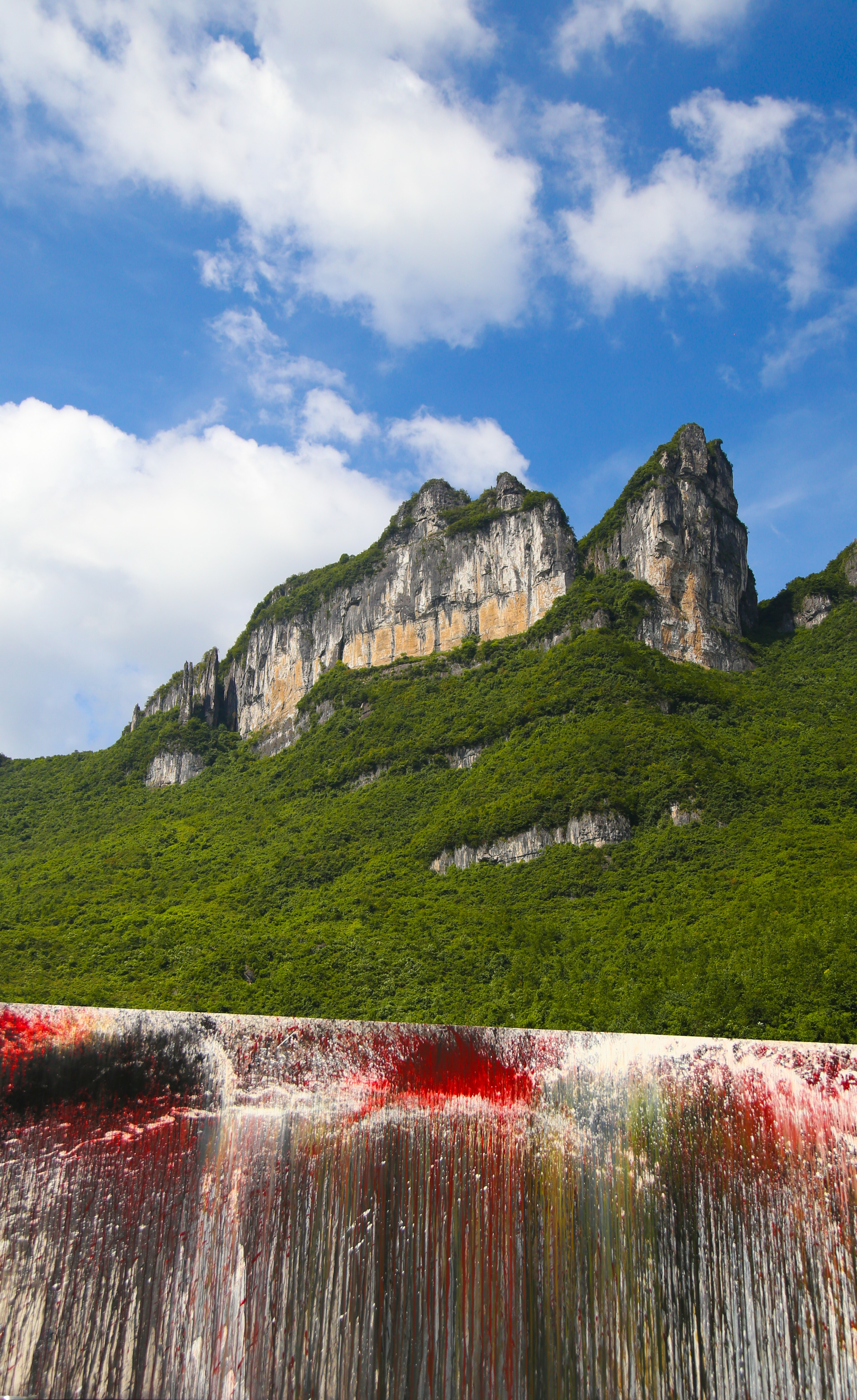
ARTLAB Museum Chongqing. Inauguration ceremony, permanent piece by Stevens Vaughn

Vaughn has stated “the art which I construct is a result of the lived experience”. Vaughn is a ceramicist and sculptor who has extended his practice into performance-based interpretations of diverse art media. Vaughn engages with traditional Chinese ink water techniques within an aesthetic context that emphasizes play, performance and spontaneity in expression.

Vaughn's style of performative action painting and his multi-media collaborations with the post-Fluxus movement in Xiamen, China, positions his art in relation to Western artists also working within the scope of Asian philosophy and contemporary conceptualism, such as Bjorn Roth, Colette Hosmer, Sigurður Guðmundsson Bjørn Nørgaard, and Bård Breivik. Vaughn's performative paintings serve as permanent installations in museums around the world. He performed at the inauguration ceremony for ART LAB Museum at Chongqing, China. His series 'Primordial' and 'Baptism of Color' have featured in exhibitions in Iceland, London, Congo, Argentina, Denmark and the National Gallery in Sofia, Bulgaria.

Vaughn's art is diverse and he is well known for his interpretations of Guan Yin Buddha, depicted always in a Red Star uniform. Vaughn's art installation "You are the center of the world” was presented at the Ch.ACO Art Fair 2020, through his Fluxus-inspired gallery, Nothing Gallery. "You are at the center of the world" is a contemporary interpretation of the ideas of power and responsibility through a multi-media presentation of art objects exploring ancient Chinese iconography, from the imperial 'Dragon' throne to the wuxing (五行). Vaughn's 'Dragon Throne' was first exhibited in the Curitiba Biennale in Brazil 2018, where over 50,000 visitors sat in the throne.

In 2022, Vaughn participated in the Lorne Biennale in Melbourne, Victoria constructing a 4.5 meter tall, 'Throne of Potentiality', out of bronze, with use of Australian iconography and cast-iron techniques. Marking the end of the COVID-19 pandemic response period in Australia, the Throne of Potentially was exhibited on the end of Lorne Pier, a symbolic expression of the road to the nation of the imagination that would bring the Australian nation out of an era of crisis.

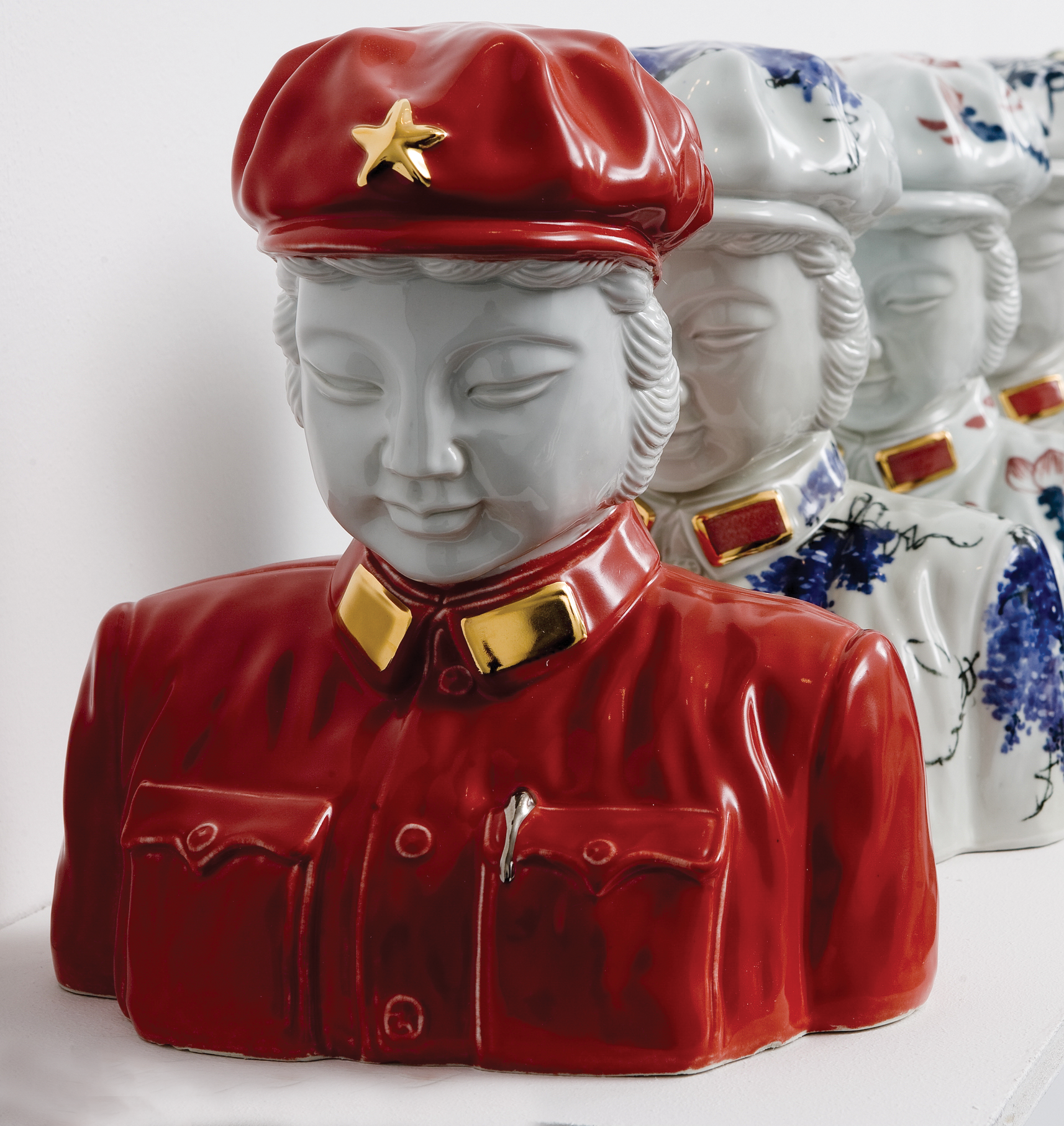
Stevens Vaughn, Guanyin Buddhas

== Selected exhibitions ==
- 2022 “Lorne Sculpture Biennale 2022” Lorne, Victoria, Australia.
- 2020 “Iron Ladies and Red Stockings” Aarhus Women's museum, Denmark.
- 2020 “Ch.ACO 2020” Santiago Art fair in collaboration with Artsy, represented by Nothing Gallery.
- 2019 “Wulong Lanba Art Festival” Performance and Exhibition, 武隆懒坝, 重庆 Chongqing(China)
- 2019 “Art is being surprised”, performance at Ningbo Huamao international Art association.
- 2018 “Chromatics surfaces” Tibaldi Arte Contemporanea, Rome (Italy)
- 2018 “Stevens Vaughn solo exhibition” Le Dame Art Gallery, London (UK)
- 2017 “Fusion” Art Museum of Nanjing University of the Arts - AMNUA - Nanjing, China
- 2017 “Stevens Vaughn & Bjørn Nørgaard” - Nothing Gallery - Xiamen, China
- 2017 “China: Rivoluzione - Evoluzione” - Museo di Roma in Trastevere - Rome, Italy
- 2017 “Como tinte que fluye” - Pabellòn de las Bellas Artes de la UCA - Buenos Aires, Argentina
- 2017 “Baptism of color” - ArtRooms - London, UK
- 2017 “Between Sand & Water” - Hafnia Gallery - Xiamen, China
- 2016 “The Rebirth of colors” - Sofia National Gallery -Bulgaria
- 2016 “Calligraphie à l’eau” - Pierre Savorgnan de Brazza Memorial in Brazzaville - Congo, Africa
- 2016 “Oltre la visione” - Le carceri, castello di Milazzo, Italy
- 2016 “La Memoria Della Forma” - Centro ArtiPlastiche, Carrara, Italy (Group Exhibition)
- 2016 “Il PrimatoDelloSguardo” - Palacultura “Antonio Da Messina”, Messina, Italy (Group Exhibition)
- 2015 “DIF- MuseoDiffuso Di Formello” - DIF Museum, Formello, Italy (Group Exhibition)
- 2015 “Stevens Vaughn live at MAAM” - Museo dell’ Altro e dell’ Altrove di MetropolizCittaMeticcia, Rome, Italy (Solo Exhibition)
- 2015 “Calligraphy of Water” - Innerspace 17, Torino, Italy (Group Exhibition)
- 2015 “Stevens and Siggi the Butcher” - Nothing Gallery, Xiamen, China (Group Exhibition)
- 2015 “Primordials” - Rolling Snowball 6, Djupivogur, Iceland (Group Exhibition)
- 2015 “Calligraphy of Water” - Palazzo DolfinBollani, Venice, Italy (Group Exhibition)
- 2015 “Shadows and Membranes” - Valparaíso, Chile (Group Exhibition)
- 2015 “Valpo Steps” - Valparaíso, Chile (Group Exhibition)
- 2015 “Utopia Distopia” - Valparaíso, Chile (Group Exhibition)
- 2015 Bienal del Fin del Mundo – IV Edition Valparaiso - Valparaíso, Chile
- 2014/2015 "Bienal del Fin del Mundo" – IV EditionMar del Plata, Argentina - Valparaíso, Chile
- 2014 “Water is a Color” - Nothing Gallery, Xiamen, China (Solo Exhibition)
- 2013 “Water is a Color” - Rolling Snowball/4 - Chinese European Art Center (CEAC)- Quanzhou, China (GroupExhibition)
- 2012 “Construction/Deconstruction” - TDK Center, Xiamen University, Xiamen, China (Group Art Action)
- 2007/2008 “Riding the Tiger” - Galleri Susanne Ottesen - Copenhagen, Denmark - Mine KinesiskVenner (Group Exhibition)
- 2007 “Blood Map of Baghdad” - Dieter Roth Academy 8th ConferenceRijksakademie, Amsterdam, Netherlands
- 2007 “Map of Beijing - One and the Other Painting”W139 Exhibition Space Stedelijk Museum, Amsterdam, Netherlands (Group Exhibition)
- 2006 “Transformation” - Dieter Roth Academy 7th ConferenceHafnia Foundation, Xiamen, China
- 2004 “Buffet of Emotions” Terra Vita - Hafnia Foundation, Xiamen, China (Group Exhibition)
- 1988/1996 "Shi Bui - Imperfection as it relates to art of painting and sculpture." Nagoya & Kyoto, Japan
- 1982 "Glass Blowing Workshop" - Hsinchu, Taiwan
- 1982 "Villa Rachictisa Anthropological Field Studies"Dabrovnik, Yugoslavia
- 1981 "Cultural Anthropology" - McCalister College St. Paul, Minnesota, USA
- 1979 "Lecturer in Philosophy and Religious Department" De La Salle University, Manila, Philippines
