= Joe Stefanelli (painter) =

American painter

- Born: Joseph J. Stefanelli; March 20, 1921; Philadelphia, Pennsylvania, U.S.
- Died: September 27, 2017 (aged 96); Lake Placid, New York City, U.S.
- Known for: Abstract expressionist painter
- Movement: Abstract Expressionism

Joe Stefanelli (March 20, 1921 – September 27, 2017), also known as Joseph J. Stefanelli, belonged to the New York School Abstract Expressionist artists whose influence and artistic innovation by the 1950s had been recognized around the world. New York School Abstract Expressionism, represented by Jackson Pollock, Willem de Kooning, Franz Kline and others became a leading art movement of the era that followed World War II. He died in September 2017 at the age of 96.

== Biography ==
Stefanelli grew up in a large working-class Italian-American family in South Philadelphia. He was born March 20, 1921, in Philadelphia, Pennsylvania.

== Studied painting ==
- 1938–1940: Philadelphia Museum School,
- 1940–1941: Pennsylvania Academy of Fine Arts
- 1948–1949: Hofmann School of Fine Art
- 1949–1950: New School for Social Research
- 1950–1951: Art Students League of New York

== Military service in World War II ==
Stefanelli entered the Army during World War II. Eventually he was working as an illustrator, from 1942 to 1946 provided field drawings that were published in "’Artists for Yank Magazine’’’. He traveled all over the South Pacific as a combat artist. Today these works are housed in the permanent collection of the World War II Archives Building, Washington, D.C.

== Participation in the downtown art scene ==
Stefanelli had his studio on the Lower East Side, on 22nd Street. Stefanelli soon joined the "Downtown Group" which represented a group of artists who found studios in lower Manhattan. Franz Kline introduced Stefanelli to 'The Artists’ Club’. located at 39 East 8th Street. Stefanelli was chosen by his fellow artists to show in the Ninth Street Show held on May 21 – June 10, 1951. The show was located at 60 East 9th Street on the first floor and the basement of a building which was about to be demolished: "The artists celebrated not only the appearance of the dealers, collectors and museum people on the 9th Street, and the consequent exposure of their work but they celebrated the creation and the strength of a living community of significant dimensions."

Stefanelli participated in 1951 and from 1954 to 1957 in the invitational New York Painting and Sculpture Annuals including the Ninth Street Show. These Annuals were important because the participants were chosen by the artists themselves.

== Teaching positions ==
By the 1960s Stefanelli, like many of his contemporaries, taught art in major universities.

- 1960, 1963: University of California, Berkeley, California
- 1963–1966: Princeton University, Princeton, New Jersey
- 1966: New School for Social Research, New York City
- 1966–1974: Columbia University, New York City
- 1974–1977: Brooklyn College, Brooklyn, New York
- 1979–1980: New York University, New York City

== Awards ==
Stefanelli has received number of awards:

- 1971: New York State Council of Art, New York
- 2000: Pollock-Krasner Foundation, New York City for his life work
- 2005: Benjamin Altman Prize, National Academy for painting

== Works in museums and public collections ==
- National Academy of Design
- Whitney Museum of American Art, New York City
- Yellowstone Art Museum, Billings, Montana

== See also ==
- Art movement
- 9th Street Art Exhibition
- Abstract expressionism
- Action painting
- New York School
