= Albert Kotin =

American painter (1907–1980)

- Born: August 7, 1907; Minsk, Russia
- Died: February 6, 1980 (aged 72); New York City, New York, USA
- Citizenship: American
- Known for: Painting
- Movement: Abstract expressionism; New York Figurative Expressionism

Albert Kotin (August 7, 1907 – February 6, 1980) was a Russian-born American abstract expressionist painter. He belonged to the early generation of New York School artists whose innovations by the 1950s had gained recognition across the Atlantic, including in Paris. The New York School's abstract expressionism, led by figures such as Jackson Pollock, Willem de Kooning, and Franz Kline, became a leading art movement of the post-World War II era.

== Biography ==
Albert Kotin was born August 7, 1907, in Minsk, Russian Empire and emigrated to the United States in 1908. He became a U.S. citizen in 1923.

Kotin studied: (1924–1929) at the National Academy of Design, New York City; with Charles Hawthorne, Provincetown, Massachusetts; (1929–32) at the Académie Julian, the Académie de la Grande Chaumière and at the Atelier de Fresque and the Académie Colarossi, Paris, France; (1947–1951) at The Art Students League of New York, New York City; under the G.I. Bill he went to study with Hans Hofmann in Provincetown and in New York City.

He participated in the Federal Art Project: Public Works of Art Project (PWAP) (1933–34) and Works Progress Administration/Federal Art Project (WPA/FAP) (1935–40). Kotin won competitions that were funded through commissions under the Treasury Department's Section of Painting and Sculpture (later known as The Section of Fine Arts) in Ada, Ohio, and in Arlington, New Jersey. He completed two WPA murals, The City and The Marsh for the Kearney, New Jersey, post office in 1938.

Kotin served in the U.S. Army military service during World War II (1941–1945).

After the war Kotin found a studio on 10th Street. He soon joined the "Downtown Group" which represented a group of artists who found studios in lower Manhattan in the area bounded by 8th and 12th street between First and Sixth Avenues during the late 1940s and early 1950s. These artists were called the "Downtown Group" as opposed to the "Uptown Group" established during the war at The Art of This Century Gallery. In 1949 Kotin joined the "Artists' Club" located at 39 East 8th Street. Albert Kotin was chosen by his fellow artists to show in the Ninth Street Show held on May 21 – June 10, 1951. The show was located at 60 East 9th Street on the first floor and the basement of a building which was about to be demolished. "The artists celebrated not only the appearance of the dealers, collectors and museum people on the 9th Street, and the consequent exposure of their work but they celebrated the creation and the strength of a living community of significant dimensions."

Kotin participated in all the invitational New York Painting and Sculpture Annuals. The first annual in 1951 was called the Ninth Street Show. From 1953 to 1957 the invitational New York Painting and Sculpture Annuals were held in the Stable Gallery on West 58th Street in New York City. He was among the 24 out of a total 256 New York School artists who was included in all the Annuals. These Annuals were important because the participants were chosen by the artists themselves. Harold Rosenberg, New York art critic listed Albert Kotin among the "Tenth Street Artists: Individuals Prevail over the Group:" Kotin was exhibited by the Anita Shapolsky Gallery in New York City, McCormick Gallery, and Robert Miller Gallery-New York.

Kotin was also a poet who inspired his fellow artists. Alexander Calder wrote in 1968, "As long as there are people such as Al Kotin, there is no danger to art."

Kotin died on February 6, 1980, in New York City from lung cancer.

== See also ==
- Art movement
- Ninth Street Show
- New York School
- Action painting
- Abstract expressionism
- Expressionism
- American Figurative Expressionism

== Catalogs which include Albert Kotin ==
- It is; a magazine for abstract art No. 4, Autumn 1959, New York City
- 10th Street The Contemporary Arts Museum Houston, Texas October 15 – November 8, 1959
- Albert Kotin Byron Gallery, Inc. New York City, April 7–25, 1964
- Albert Kotin 1907–1980 Memorial Exhibition Long Island University, The Brooklyn Center, Brooklyn, New York. October 6–29, 1982
- Albert Kotin Retrospective: Paintings, Drawings, Prints Artfull Eye Exhibition Gallery, Lambertville, New Jersey. October 30 – November 20, 1988
- Mishkin Gallery Reclaiming Artists of the New York School Toward a More Inclusive view of the 1950s Baruch College CUNY March 18 – April 22, 1994
- Provicetown Art Association Hans Hofmann, New York-Provincetown: A 50s Connection Provincetown Art Association and Museum, Provincetown, Massachusetts July 8 – August 1, 1994
- Rockford Art Museum Reuniting an Era abstract expressionists of the 1950s Rockford Art Museum, Rockford, Illinois November 12, 2004 – January 25, 2005

== Books ==
- Marika Herskovic, American Abstract and Figurative Expressionism: Style Is Timely Art Is Timeless (New York School Press, 2009.) ISBN 978-0-9677994-2-1. pp. 140–143
- Marika Herskovic, American Abstract Expressionism of the 1950s An Illustrated Survey, (New York School Press, 2003.) ISBN 0-9677994-1-4. pp. 190–193
- Marika Herskovic, New York School Abstract Expressionists Artists Choice by Artists, (New York School Press, 2000.) ISBN 0-9677994-0-6. p. 16; p. 37; pp. 206–209
- Marika Herskovic, Albert Kotin American Abstract Expressionist of the 1950s (New York School Press, 2016.) ISBN 978-0967799438
