= Melville Price =

American painter

- Born: 1920; New York City, U.S.
- Died: 1970 (aged 49–50); Tuscaloosa, Alabama, U.S.
- Occupations: Professor, painter

Melville Price (1920–1970) was an American painter and educator.

== Life ==
Price was born in 1920 in New York City.

Price experimented with Surrealism and Cubism before embracing Abstract Expressionism. He first taught art in Pennsylvania, including summer classes at Penn State Abington. He later became a professor of art at the University of Alabama.

Price died in 1970 in Tuscaloosa, Alabama. For art critic Sarah Lansdell, "Price was not a compromiser and his works are deliberately harsh."
