= Hugh Kappel =

American artist

Hugh Kappel (born 1910 Berlin – 1982) was an American artist.

== Life ==
He received an M.A. in philosophy. He studied at Parisian art schools. He immigrated to New York City in 1938.

In 1940, he became an American citizen. In 1940, he met Anne Heyneman; they married; they had a daughter, Karen, in 1946; but divorced. He taught at the Minneapolis College of Art and Design.

His work is in the Walker Art Center, and the Minneapolis Institute of Arts. A folder is held at the Archives of American Art.

== Exhibitions ==
- 2008 "Abstraction: Summer 2008", McCormick Gallery
- 2005 "Abstract Painting in Minnesota: Selected Works 1930 to the Present" Minnesota Museum of American Art

== Bibliography ==
- The Happy Hippopotamus
- The Whoosits
