= Action painting =

Style of painting

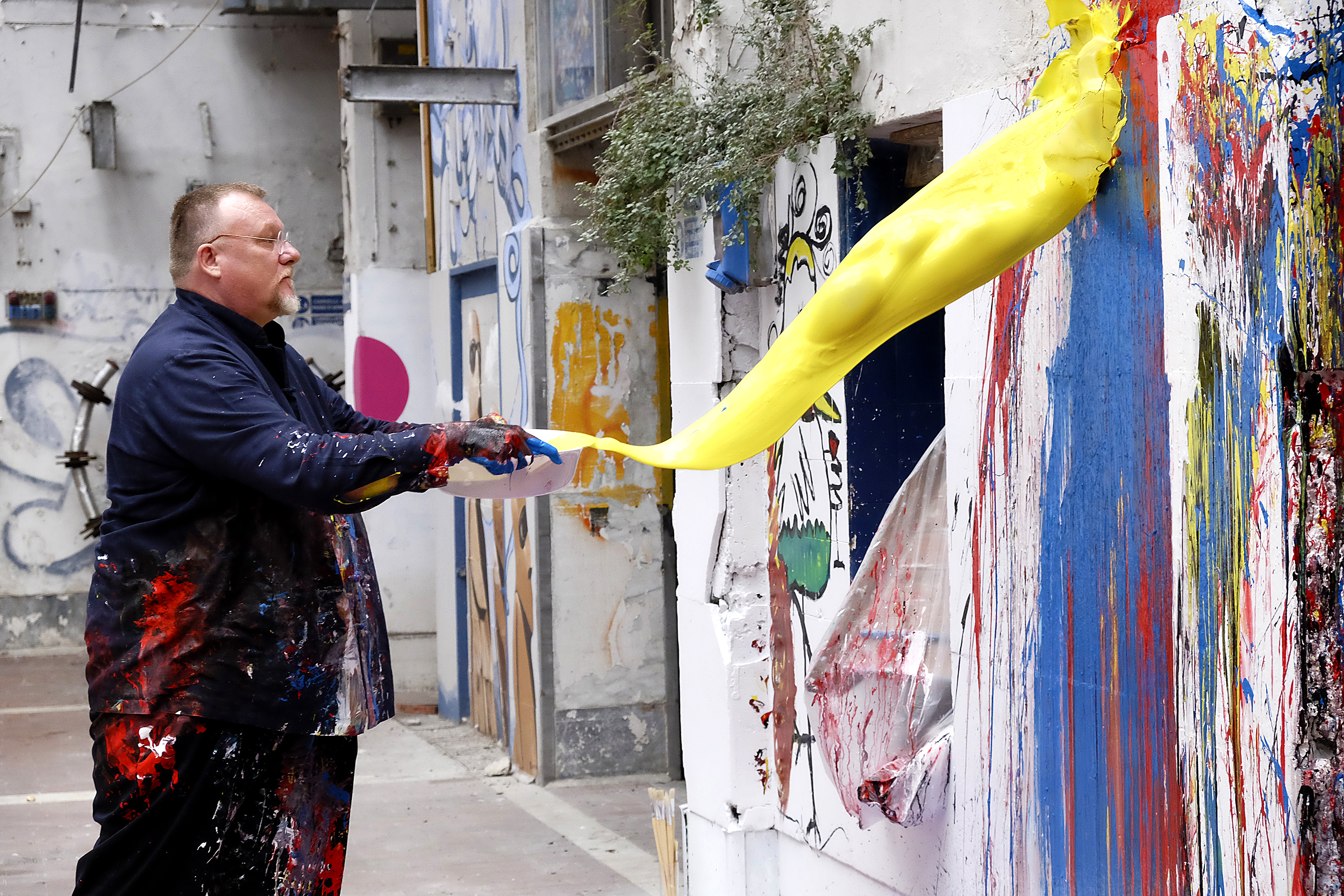
Action painting by US artist Stevens Vaughn, 2015

Action painting, sometimes called "gestural abstraction", is a style of painting in which paint is spontaneously dribbled, splashed or smeared onto the canvas, rather than being carefully applied. The resulting work often emphasizes the physical act of painting itself as an essential aspect of the finished work or concern of its artist.

== Background ==
The style was widespread from the 1940s until the early 1960s, and is closely associated with abstract expressionism (some critics have used the terms "action painting" and "abstract expressionism" interchangeably). A comparison is often drawn between the American action painting and the French tachisme. The New York School of American Abstract Expressionism (1940s-50s) is also seen as closely linked to the movement.

The term was coined by the American critic Harold Rosenberg in 1952, in his essay "The American Action Painters", and signaled a major shift in the aesthetic perspective of New York School painters and critics. According to Rosenberg the canvas was "an arena in which to act". The actions and means for creating the painting were seen, in action painting, of a higher importance than the result. While Rosenberg created the term "action painting" in 1952, he began creating his action theory in the 1930s as a critic. While abstract expressionists such as Jackson Pollock, Franz Kline and Willem de Kooning had long been outspoken in their view of a painting as an arena within which to come to terms with the act of creation, earlier critics sympathetic to their cause, like Clement Greenberg, focused on their works' "objectness." Clement Greenberg was also an influential critic in action painting, intrigued by the creative struggle, which he claimed was evidenced by the surface of the painting. To Greenberg, it was the physicality of the paintings' clotted and oil-caked surfaces that was the key to understanding them. "Some of the labels that became attached to Abstract Expressionism, like "informel" and "Action Painting," definitely implied this; one was given to understand that what was involved was an utterly new kind of art that was no longer art in any accepted sense. This was, of course, absurd." – Clement Greenberg, "Post Painterly Abstraction".

Rosenberg's critique shifted the emphasis from the object to the struggle itself, with the finished painting being only the physical manifestation, a kind of residue, of the actual work of art, which was in the act or process of the painting's creation. The newer research tends to put the exile-surrealist Wolfgang Paalen in the position of the artist and theoretician who used the term "action" at first in this sense and fostered the theory of the subjective struggle with it. In his theory of the viewer-dependent possibility space, in which the artist "acts" like in an ecstatic ritual, Paalen considers ideas of quantum mechanics, as well as idiosyncratic interpretations of the totemic vision and the spatial structure of native-Indian painting from British Columbia. His long essay Totem Art (1943) had considerable influence on such artists as Martha Graham, Barnett Newman, Isamu Noguchi, Jackson Pollock and Mark Rothko; Paalen describes a highly artistic vision of totemic art as part of a ritual "action" with psychic links to genetic memory and matrilinear ancestor-worship.

Over the next two decades, Rosenberg's redefinition of art as an act rather than an object, as a process rather than a product, was influential, and laid the foundation for a number of major art movements, from Happenings and Fluxus to Conceptual, Performance art, Installation art and Earth Art.

== Historical context ==
It is essential for the understanding of action painting to place it in historical context. The action painting movement took place in the time after World War II ended. With this came a disordered economy and culture in Europe, and in America the government took advantage of their new state of importance. A product of the post-World War II artistic resurgence of expressionism in America and more specifically New York City, action painting developed in an era where quantum mechanics and psychoanalysis were beginning to flourish and were changing people's perception of the physical and psychological world; and civilization's understanding of the world through heightened self-consciousness and awareness.

American action painters pondered the nature of art as well as the reasons for the existence of art often when questioning what the value of action painting is. The preceding art of Kandinsky and Mondrian had freed itself from the portrayal of objects and instead tried to evoke, address and delineate, through the aesthetic sense, emotions and feelings within the viewer. Action painting took this a step further, using both Jung and Freud's ideas of the subconscious as its underlying foundations. Many of the painters were interested in Carl Jung's studies of archetypal images and types, and used their own internal visions to create their paintings. Along with Jung, Sigmund Freud and Surrealism were also influential to the beginning of action painting. The paintings of the Action painters were not meant to portray objects per se or even specific emotions. Instead they were meant to touch the observer deep in the subconscious mind, evoking a sense of the primeval and tapping the collective sense of an archetypal visual language. This was done by the artist painting "unconsciously," and spontaneously, creating a powerful arena of raw emotion and action, in the moment. Action painting was clearly influenced by the surrealist emphasis on automatism which (also) influenced by psychoanalysis claimed a more direct access to the subconscious mind. Important exponents of this concept of art making were the painters Joan Miró and André Masson.

== Notable action painters ==
- Ana Hatherly
- Frank Avray Wilson
- Norman Bluhm
- James Brooks
- Nicolas Carone
- Elaine de Kooning
- Willem de Kooning
- John Ferren
- Perle Fine
- Sam Francis
- Michael Goldberg
- William Green
- Ismail Gulgee
- Philip Guston
- Grace Hartigan
- Franz Kline
- Albert Kotin
- Lee Krasner
- Alfred Leslie
- Conrad Marca-Relli
- Georges Mathieu
- Joan Mitchell
- Jackson Pollock
- Milton Resnick
- Joe Stefanelli
- Jack Tworkov

== Exhibitions ==
- Action Painting
  - Organized by Ulf Küster. Fondation Beyekerm Basekm Switzerland, January 27–May 12, 2008
- Action/Abstraction: Pollock, de Kooning, and American Art, 1940–1976
  - Organized by Norman L. Kleeblatt. Jewish Museum, New York, May 4–September 21, 2008

== See also ==
- Tachisme
- Michel Tapié
- Gutai group
- Abstract Imagists
- New York School
- Abstract Expressionism
- Lyrical abstraction
- 9th Street Art Exhibition
- Tenth Street galleries

== References and notes ==
- Rosenberg, Harold The Tradition of the New (1959) - Ayer Co Pub - ISBN 0-8369-2127-5
- Wills, Garry Action Painting in Venice (1994)
- Marika Herskovic, American Abstract Expressionism of the 1950s An Illustrated Survey, (New York School Press, 2003.) ISBN 0-9677994-1-4
- Marika Herskovic, New York School Abstract Expressionists Artists Choice by Artists, (New York School Press, 2000.) ISBN 0-9677994-0-6
- Hrebeniak, Michael. Action Writing: Jack Kerouac's Wild Form, Carbondale, IL: Southern Illinois UP, 2006.
