= Richard Zoellner =

American painter

- Born: June 30, 1908; Portsmouth, Ohio, U.S.
- Died: March 6, 2003 (aged 94); Tuscaloosa, Alabama, U.S.
- Education: Art Academy of Cincinnati
- Occupation: Painter
- Spouse: Willita Skelton Goodson
- Children: 1 son

Richard C. Zoellner (June 30, 1908 - March 3, 2003) was an American abstract painter, muralist, printmaker and art educator. During the New Deal, he was commissioned murals in the post offices of Cleveland, Georgetown, Hamilton, Medina, and Portsmouth in Ohio, as well as Mannington, West Virginia. He had a studio in Cincinnati from 1933 to 1942, and he taught at the University of Alabama from 1945 to 1978.
