= Olive Nuhfer =

American artist

Olive Harriett Nuhfer
- Born: Olive Harriett Austin; August 16, 1901; Pittsburgh, Pennsylvania, U.S.
- Died: October 8, 1996 (aged 95); Pittsburgh, Pennsylvania, U.S.
- Known for: muralist

Olive Nuhfer (1901-1996) was an American painter. She is best known for her New Deal era mural, The Daily Mail, in the Westerville, Ohio Post Office.

== Biography ==
Nuhfer née Austin was born on August 16, 1901, in Pittsburgh, Pennsylvania. She married Leo R. Nuhfer on May 27, 1926 in Parkersburg, West Virginia. She attended the University of Oklahoma earning a bachelor's and master's degree. Nuhfer completed post graduate work at Carnegie Mellon University.

In addition to her own painting, she was an art instructor and involved with the Somerset County Artists' Association. In 1937 she painted the mural The Daily Mail for the Westerville, Ohio Post Office which was commissioned as a homage to mail carriers but created controversy when local residents complained that the image was not representative of their town. The mural was funded by the Treasury Section of Fine Arts (TSFA). Her 1937 portrait Electric Welder is in the Steidle Collection of American Industrial Art at Penn State College of Earth and Mineral Sciences. Around 1959 she painted a portrait of Dwight D. Eisenhower, which is now in the collection of the Dwight D. Eisenhower Library-Museum. In 1961, Nuhfer founded the Penn Arts Association in Penn Hills, Pennsylvania.

In 1990 Nuhfer suffered a stroke, but after a three year hiatus, resumed painting with her other hand. She died on October 8, 1996, in Pittsburgh.

In 2016, her painting Pittsburgh Landscape was included in the exhibition The Gift of Art: 100 Years of Art from the Pittsburgh Public Schools' Collection at the Heinz History Center.
