= Almine Rech =

French gallerist

Almine Rech Ruiz-Picasso (née Rech) is a French art dealer and owner of the eponymous contemporary art gallery. Founded in Paris in 1989 with an exhibition of James Turrell’s 'Space Division' work, Almine Rech has grown into an internationally recognized gallery known for its commitment to minimal, perceptual, and conceptual practices. Over the following decades, the gallery expanded strategically to Brussels, London, New York, and Shanghai, while maintaining its strong Parisian foundation.

== Early life and education ==
Almine Rech was born in Paris to a Vietnamese-French mother and a French father, Georges Rech, who founded one of France's first ready-to-wear labels in the 1960s. She took up painting and drawing in high school and while at boarding school in Switzerland before studying art, cinema and literature at Faculté des lettres de Paris and the École du Louvre.

== Career ==
=== Early beginnings ===
Early in her career, Rech did provenance research for Parisian auction houses. By the mid-1980s she was married to her first husband, businessman Xavier de Froment, for six years and had started selling art, helping friends and clients part with modernist artworks from the likes of Pierre Bonnard, Kurt Schwitters, and Félix Vallotton.

Rech began her career as a gallerist in partnership for 5 years with Cyrille Putman, the son of Andrée Putman, opening a gallery in the Marais in 1989 where they presented a single work by James Turrell, who did not have a European dealer at the time; Robert R. Littman, the director of Centro Cultural Arte Contemporaneo, a private museum in Mexico City, bought the work.

=== Almine Rech, 1997–present ===
Alongside other galleries including Air de Paris and Galerie Perrotin, Rech opened her own gallery on Rue Louise Weiss in the 13th arrondissement in 1997, as part of a city-sponsored initiative. At the time, she worked with artists Ugo Rondinone, Joseph Kosuth, and other artists with minimalist and conceptual leanings, including James Turrell and John McCracken.

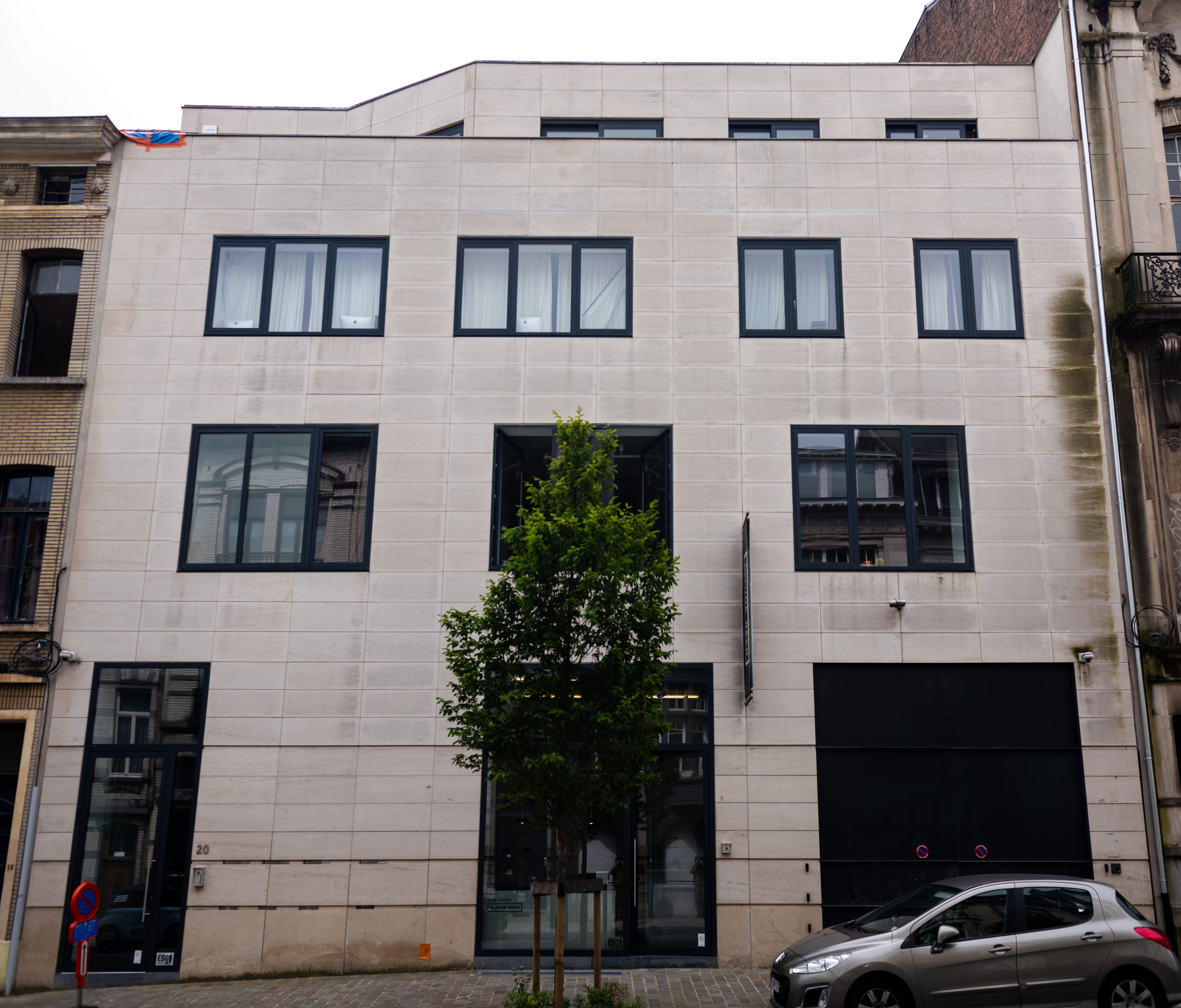
The Almine Rech gallery in Brussels, Belgium.

In 2006, the gallery moved to a larger, two-story space in the Marais district, before launching its current space in rue de Turenne in 2013. In 2008, Rech opened a second gallery in Brussels. From 2014 to 2025, the gallery operated a 225 m^{2} (2,420 sq ft) space in London.

In 2016, the gallery added a 280 m^{2} (3,000 sq ft) space – in New York. In 2019, the gallery expanded to Shanghai, where it operates a 370 m^{2} (4,000 sq ft) space in the Amber Building — a three-story former People's Bank of China warehouse at 27 Hu Qiu Road –, sharing the floor with Lisson Gallery. On the gallery's expansion, Rech has noted, 'Each step in expanding our platform has increased our ability to support and invest in a new generation of artists, which is a consideration at the very core of our gallery's DNA.'

In 2021, amid the COVID-19 pandemic in the United States, the gallery opened a 84 m^{2} (900 sq ft) space next door to the Aspen Art Museum in Aspen.

A second space opened in Paris on Avenue Matignon (with a further expansion of the space in 2022), and a second New York gallery in Tribeca opened in October 2023. In 2024, the gallery expanded in Monaco with the opening of a new space in the Carré d'Or district. In addition to exhibitions hosted in the various gallery locations, Almine Rech participates in numerous art fairs including Art Basel, TEFAF, Art Basel Paris, and Frieze.

Through Almine Rech Editions, the gallery also produces prints, catalogues, and monographs, contributing to the preservation and dissemination of critical artistic discourse.

Almine Rech represents numerous living artists, including:

- James Turrell (since 1995)
- Allen Jones (since 2019)
- Jeff Koons (since 2009)

In addition, the gallery has managed various artist estates, including:

- Karel Appel
- Leonora Carrington (since 2026)
- Günther Förg (until 2018)
- Serge Poliakoff
- Antoni Tàpies (since 2019)
- Tom Wesselmann

== Other activities ==
- Drawing Center, Member of the Board of Directors (since 2019)

== Recognition ==
Rech is an Officier of the Ordre des Arts et des Lettres.

Rech is co-president of the Fundación Almine Y Bernard Ruiz-Picasso Para El Arte (FABA) and member of The International Council of The Metropolitan Museum of Art (The Met).

== Personal life ==
Since 1997, Rech has been married to Bernard Ruiz-Picasso. They lived in Brussels since 2006 but have since moved to Monaco, and also maintain a French country estate inherited from Picasso called Boisgeloup.

Since 2002, Rech and Ruiz-Picasso have been serving as co-chairs of the Madrid-based Fundación Almine Y Bernard Ruiz-Picasso Para El Arte (FABA), which holds a collection of works by Pablo Picasso. FABA also supports institutions, including Le Consortium in Dijon, France, Serpentine Galleries in London and the New Museum in New York. In 2012, Ruiz-Picasso and Rech opened up Boisgeloup, inviting artists to exhibit on its grounds.

== Major artists represented by the gallery ==
- James Turrell
- Allen Jones
- Jeff Koons
- Joe Andoe
- Joël Andrianomearisoa
- The estate of Karel Appel
- John M Armleder
- Farah Atassi
- Miquel Barceló
- Oliver Beer
- Jean-Baptiste Bernadet
- Matthias Bitzer
- Jenny Brosinski
- Alexander Calder
- Javier Calleja
- Brian Calvin
- Alejandro Cardenas
- Ali Cherri
- Ha Chong-Hyun
- Johan Creten
- Sasha Ferré
- Genieve Figgis
- Paul de Flers
- Gerasimos Floratos
- Günther Förg
- Mehdi Ghadyanloo
- Daniel Gibson
- The estate of John Giorno
- Jameson Green
- Peter Halley
- Gregor Hildebrandt
- Ryoji Ikeda
- Alex Israel
- Carlos Jacanamijoy
- Haley Josephs
- Youngju Joung
- Ewa Juszkiewicz
- Michael Kagan
- Minjung Kim
- Leelee Kimmel
- Joseph Kosuth
- Christopher Le Brun
- Alexandre Lenoir
- Erik Lindman
- Inès Longevial
- Markus Lüpertz
- Heinz Mack
- Tomokazu Matsuyama
- John McAllister
- Sam McKinniss
- The estate of Jean Miotte
- Keita Morimoto
- Tia-Thuy Nguyen
- Hans Op de Beeck
- Pablo Picasso
- The estate of Serge Poliakoff
- Larry Poons
- Richard Prince
- Li Qing
- Nathaniel Mary Quinn
- Umar Rashid
- Kenny Scharf
- Ryan Schneider
- Laurie Simmons
- Taryn Simon
- Vaughn Spann
- Vivian Springford
- Claire Tabouret
- Genesis Tramaine
- Thu Van Tran
- The estate of Kim Tschang-yeul
- The estate of De Wain Valentine
- Jess Valice
- Francesco Vezzoli
- Brent Wadden
- Amanda Wall
- The estate of Tom Wesselmann
- Chloe Wise
- Ji Xin
- Huang Yuxing
- Zio Ziegler
