= Jess Valice =

American artist

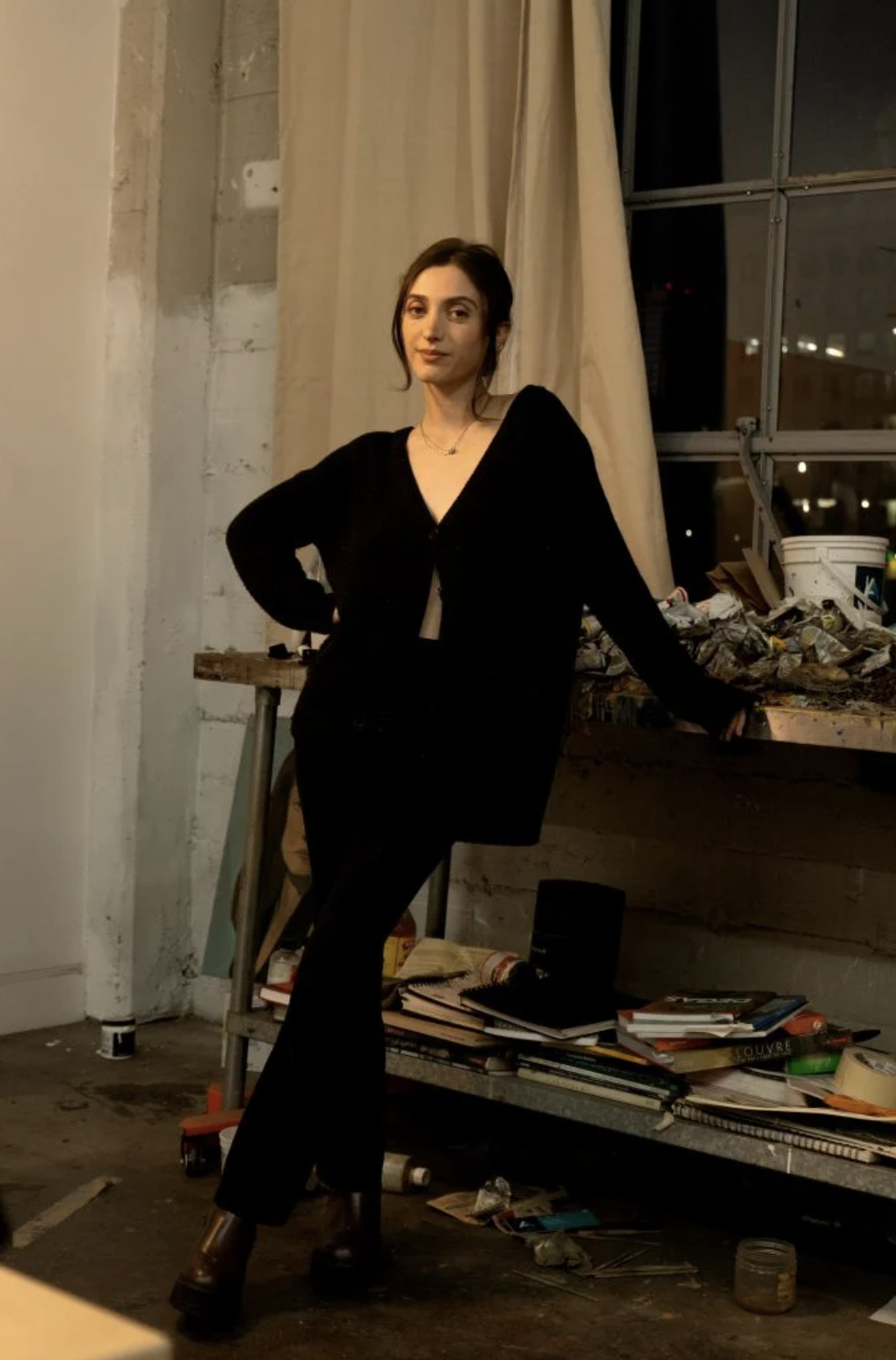
- Born: Jessica Valice
- Occupation: Artist
- Website: jessvalice.com

Jessica Valice is an American artist. The subjects in her work often have exaggerated features, such as enlarged eyes with visible lower sclera.

== Early life and education ==
Valice initially pursued studies in neuroscience at Santa Barbara City College for three years before turning into art. This background has significantly influenced her artistic approach, particularly her interest in perception and the complexities of human emotion.

== Work ==
Valice's artistic style is characterized by a contrast between occasionally exaggerated physical features—such as enlarged eyes, hands and feet or disproportionately large ears—and consistently neutral facial expressions. In an interview with ARTnews, Valice stated, "I still refuse to include facial expression," indicating her focus on abstraction while maintaining the human figure as a central subject.

She presented her first solo exhibition with Almine Rech gallery in New York in 2024. This exhibition was titled 'Mara', referencing the figure in Buddhist cosmology named Mara associated with death, rebirth and desire. Valice's thematic explores the inner experience and the human condition.

In 2025, Valice was one of the artists that The Hollywood Reporter commissioned artists to reimagine the Oscar statuette, among artists such as Umar Rashid, Kathryn Andrews and Austyn Weiner. These "reimagined Oscars" were displayed at Hollywood's AF Projects during LA Art Week.
