= Rosa de la Cruz =

Cuban-American businesswoman (born 1944)

- Born: August 13, 1942; Havana, Cuba
- Died: February 25, 2024 (aged 81); Key Biscayne, Florida, US
- Known for: De la Cruz Collection (2009–2024)
- Spouse: Carlos de la Cruz
- Children: 5
- Website: delacruzcollection.org

Rosa Rionda de la Cruz (1942–2024) was a Cuban-American businesswoman. She was best known as a collector of contemporary art.

== Biography ==
Rosa de la Cruz started her art collection in the 1960s, along with her husband, Cuban-American businessman Carlos de la Cruz. Married since 1962, the couple has assembled one of Miami's finest collections of contemporary art, particularly postwar German paintings. Most of her works have been exhibited in the private De la Cruz Collection museum since 2009, 10,000m² dedicated to contemporary art in Miami in a building designed by John Marquette. Rosa and Carlos had five children and lived in Key Biscayne, Florida.

== Collection ==
The first work she acquired was "Star Gazer" (1956), by the Mexican artist Rufino Tamayo. The collection includes work by Dan Colen, Kathryn Andrews, Ana Mendieta, Jim Hodges, Martin Kippenberger, Isa Genzken, Christopher Wool, Félix González-Torres, Mark Bradford, Peter Doig, Nate Lowman, Christian Holstad and Sterling Ruby. Other important artists are Wifredo Lam and Salvador Dalí, whose portrait of Carlos de la Cruz's mother, Dolores Suero Falla, belongs to the collection.

In 2016, ArtNews included Rosa de la Cruz among the "Top 200 Collectors".

== Death ==
Rosa de la Cruz died at the age of 81 in her home on Key Biscayne, Florida on February 25, 2024, following a long period with an undisclosed autoimmune disorder.
