= Andrea Marie Breiling =

Contemporary painter

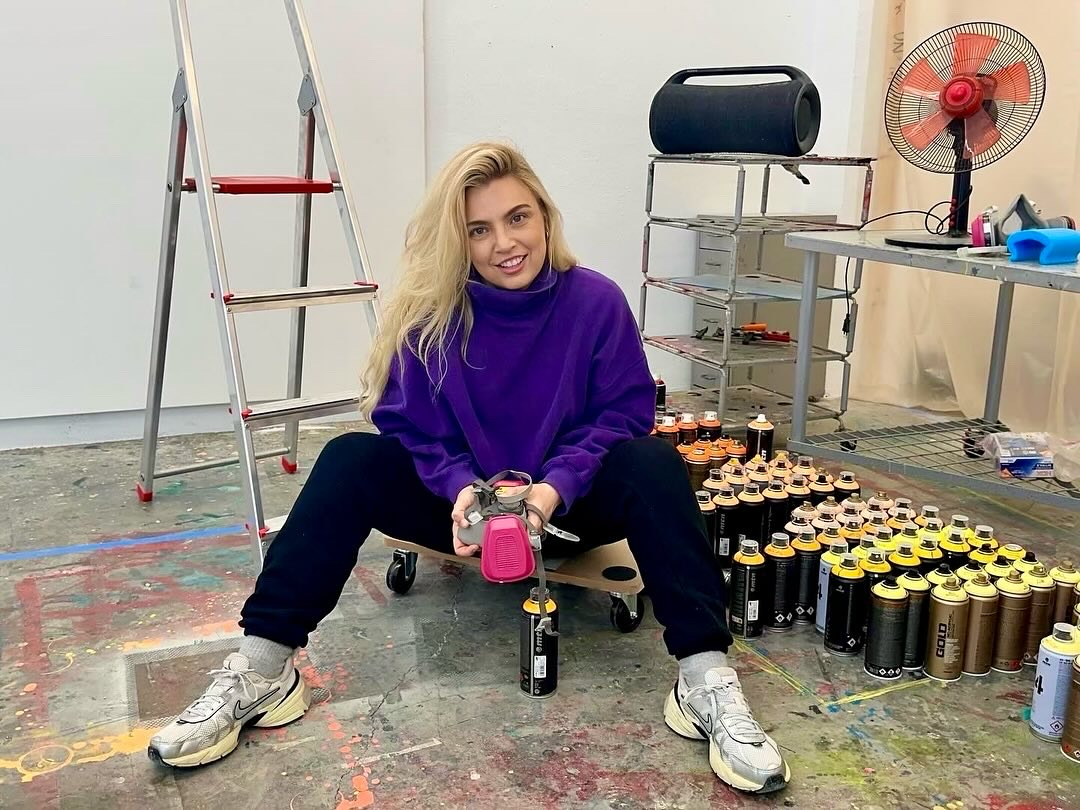
- Education: University of California, Irvine, Claremont Graduate University; BFA in Studio Art & Gender Studies, MFA in Studio Art
- Occupation: Contemporary painter
- Known for: Large-scale abstract works

Andrea Marie Breiling is an American contemporary painter known for large-scale abstract works.

== Early life and education ==
Breiling was born in Phoenix, Arizona. She holds a BFA in Studio Art and Gender Studies from University of California, Irvine (2008). She also holds an MFA in Studio Art from Claremont Graduate University (2014).

== Career ==
Breiling started her arts career painting with brushes in a bold colourful abstract style. She transitioned to using spray paint on canvas.

Breiling presented her first ever solo show with Broadway Gallery in 2021. The same year, she staged her first solo exhibition with Almine Rech in Brussels, Belgium. She also presented another exhibition in London within the same 2021. In 2022, she staged a solo show presented by Night Gallery at Villa Paula in Miami. This was featured by Cultured Magazine as one of the 9 Miami Art Week Openings You Shouldn't Miss. In 2023, she did another solo exhibition with Almine Rech in New York City. She has also staged other solo shows with notable galleries across the United States.

Breiling and her work have been featured multiple times on Artsy’s 10 In-demand works on Artsy This Week. She has also been featured in other notable media.

Breiling's art belongs to the public collections of Institute of Contemporary Art, Miami, FL, Phoenix Art Museum, Phoenix, AZ, and other museums and institutions. She is represented by Night Gallery (Los Angeles) and Almine Rech Gallery.

== Publication ==
A hardcover book of Breiling's work, titled Spray Paint Paintings was published by Almine Rech Editions in collaboration with Night Gallery in 2023.

== Recognitions ==
- 2023 – Recognized by Artsy as one of the Top 10 Women Abstract Artists on the Rise
- 2023 – Named one of Ocula's Five Artists to Watch
- 2023 – Highlighted by Barry Schwabsky in Artnet as one of the 13 Artists Poised to Break Out Big in 2023.
