= Ringvall =

Ringvall is a surname. Notable people with the surname include:

- Axel Ringvall, Swedish actor
- Britta Ringvall, Swedish artist
