= Massimo De Carlo =

Italian art dealer

Massimo De Carlo is an Italian art dealer, with gallery spaces in Milan, London, Hong Kong, Beijing, Seoul and Paris.

== Career ==
After graduating in Pharmacy at University of Padua, where he co-curated a number of jazz seasons at Centro d'Arte Padova, De Carlo started working as a gallery assistant for Piero Cavellini, son of artist Guglielmo Achille Cavellini, in Brescia. In 1987 he opened his first gallery space, located in via Bocconi, Milan.

In 1999, Italian artist Maurizio Cattelan suspended Massimo De Carlo on the wall of his second gallery space using duct tape, for a piece titled A Perfect Day. After the gallery moved to his third space in via Ventura, the former gallery became the house of Margherita Palli and Italo Rota.

In 2009 Massimo De Carlo opened a gallery at 55 South Audley Street, in Mayfair, London. This was followed by a gallery space in Hong Kong in 2016.

Massimo De Carlo added another Milan gallery to the ground floor of Casa Corbellini-Wassermann, a building designed by architect Piero Portaluppi in the Città Studi neighbourhood. In 2021, another space opened in Paris under the name Pièce Unique.

In addition, De Carlo serves on the selection committee for Art Basel's Hong Kong edition.

== Artists ==
The gallery represents numerous living artists, including:

- Sanford Biggers
- Maurizio Cattelan
- Dan Colen
- Elmgreen & Dragset (since 2020)
- Rashid Johnson
- Elad Lassry
- Tony Lewis
- Nate Lowman
- Ferrari Sheppard
- Josh Smith
- Rudolf Stingel
- Austyn Weiner

In addition, the gallery manages various artist estates, including:

- Kaari Upson
