= Frohawk =

Frohawk may refer to:

- An ethnic variation of the mohawk hairstyle
- Frederick William Frohawk (1861–1946), British artist and entomologist
- Frohawk Two Feathers (born 1976), American artist
