= Austyn Weiner =

US contemporary artist (born 1989)

- Born: 1989 (age 36–37); Miami, Florida
- Occupation: Artist
- Website: austynweiner.com

Austyn Weiner (born in 1989) is an American contemporary artist based in Los Angeles, California. Working primary in large-scale oil painting, mixed media and photography. She is known for an abstract expressionist style that incorporates gestural brushwork.

== Early life and education ==
Weiner was born and raised in Miami, Florida. She began as a photographer, picking up a camera at 14. She studied for two years at the University of Michigan School of Art and Design before returning to Miami to focus on her art. She later spent a semester at Tel Aviv University in Israel before continuing her studies at Parsons School of Design in New York City. During her studies, she began printing her photographs of models and painting directly over them, a transitional process that prompted her shift towards painting as her primary medium.

== Artistic practice ==
Weiner's practice centers on a physical, highly intuitive process of layering oil paint, acrylic, charcoal, and oil stick on canvas to construct large-scale works that navigate the boundary between abstraction and distorted figuration. Working from her studio in Los Angeles, she utilizes scaffolding to execute what Vogue arts writer Dodie Kazanjian characterized as "full-arm painting" a physically demanding technique where brushwork pacing and gestural tempo are driven by music and rhythm. Her visual vocabulary draws heavily upon her Jewish-American heritage, personal history, and postwar female abstraction, frequently establishing stylistic dialogues with painters such as Philip Guston, Chaïm Soutine, Francis Bacon and Tracey Emin.

== Career ==
In 2013, while living in New York, Weiner was the youngest artist selected to contribute to The Arts Initiative, a public art collective organized by Miami's Primary Flight gallery for the Fashion Outlets of Chicago in Rosemont, Illinois. For the installation, she created a 40-by10-foot Plexiglas photographic work exhibited alongside pieces by Daniel Arsham, FriendsWithYou, and Jim Drain.

In September 2019, she collaborated with the French fashion label Each x Other on a capsule clothing collection featuring her art, which debuted during Paris Fashion Week.

In May 2020, during the COVID-19 lockdowns, Weiner converted her East Los Angeles workspace into a by-appointment pop-up gallery called the Soul Car Garage, acting as her own installer and dealer, she mounted a solo exhibition titled "Head". In October 2020, she opened her first European solo exhibition, Nobody's Baby, at Carl Kostyál gallery in London, featuring paintings created during the pandemic.

In November 2022, MASSIMODECARLO announced Weiner's representation.

In March 2025, Weiner was one of the artists that The Hollywood Reporter commissioned to reimagine the Oscar statuette, among artists such as Umar Rashid, Kathryn Andrews, Drake Carr. These were displayed at Hollywood's AF Projects during LA Art week.

In May 2025, Weiner presented a solo exhibition Half Way Home at Lévy Gorvy Dayan gallery in New York. She exhibited three monumental abstract paintings, exploring grief, loss and resilience. Inspired by Claude Monet's Water Lilies, the exhibition evolved into a deeply personal reflection following the deaths of her father, close friend, and grandmother. The paintings trace an emotional journey from nostalgia through grief towards hope.

In January 2026, she made her Milan solo debut with Something Borrowed, Something Plum at MASSIMODECARLO.
