= Armer =

Armer is a surname. Notable people with the surname include:

- Alan Armer (1922–2010), American television writer, producer, and director
- Elinor Armer (born 1939), American pianist, music educator and composer
- Laura Adams Armer (1874–1963), American artist and writer
- Ruth Armer (1896–1977), American painter, teacher, art collector, and lithographer
