= Chloe Wise =

Canadian artist based in New York City (born 1990)

- Born: 1990 (age 35–36); Montreal, Quebec, Canada
- Education: Concordia University
- Known for: Bread Bags
- Notable work: Bagel No. 5
- Website: chloewise.com

Chloe Wise (born 1990) is a Canadian artist based in New York City. Wise works in sculpture, drawing, video art, and oil painting. Wise is known for her stylized and humorous approach to both still life and figurative painting that incorporate intimate depictions of food trends, agriculture, consumer culture, friends, and muses.

In 2014, actor Bobbi Menuez attended a Chanel launch event wearing Wise's sculpture, "Bagel No. 5," a realistic sculpture of a bagel with cream cheese adorned with a Chanel purse chain and charm. The sculpture was believed to be a real purse designed by Chanel, until it was revealed that the "bag" was part of a collection created by Wise.

== Early life and education ==
Wise was born in Montreal, Quebec. She graduated from Concordia University in 2013 with a degree in Fine Arts and Art History.

== Work ==
In 2013, Wise began a collection of sculptures featuring different kinds of bread adorned with designer labels modeled after various It bags. The sculptures were made out of urethane and oil paint and finished with a designer label or charm along with straps to make it look like a functional bag or purse. The collection began with a play on the Louis Vuitton "baguettes," in which Wise created a bread mold of a baguette out of urethane and then painted it with oil paints to resemble a real loaf of bread. She then drilled into the sculpture to add straps and a Louis Vuitton charm. The collection also includes a Prada backpack made of a sculpted, braided challah loaf titled Ain't No Challah Back Girl, and another piece with a sculpted bagel with cream cheese completed with a Chanel chain and charm called Bagel No. 5.

Wise's first gallery show with Almine Rech, Of false beaches and butter money, in Paris, France in 2017. Two more exhibitions with Almine Rech took place in 2019, Lineup in New York and Not That We Don’t in London.

In 2019, designer Simon Porte Jacquemus worked with Wise to illustrate the designer's Spring 2019 campaign.

Wise's first institutional exhibition was in 2019 at Herning Museum of Contemporary Art, Denmark, titled And Everything Was True.

In 2021, Wise had an exhibition, Thank You For The Nice Fire, at Almine Rech Gallery. The title of the exhibition references a scene in Don DeLillo's White Noise. The exhibition featured paintings of friends, like model and photographer Richie Shazam, as well as trompe-l'oeil chandeliers and sconces that looked like romaine lettuce covered in caesar dressing. Wise also had work at Fantasy America at The Andy Warhol Museum in Pittsburgh.

== Themes ==
Wise often critiques consumer culture, commercialization, ideas of wellness, and the self-construction of identity with a balance of comedy and sincere optimism. Wise employs comedic and satirical strategies while using references to art history, such as the pronkstillevens that inspired sculptures in her exhibition Of false beaches and butter money.

== Solo exhibitions ==
- 'Extrasensory', Kulturstiftung Basel H. Geiger, Basel, Switzerland, 2026
- Myth Information, Almine Rech, New York, US, 2025
- But Wait There's More!, On the High Line, New York, NY, US, 2024
- Torn Clean, Almine Rech, Brussels, Belgium, 2024
- Thank You For The Nice Fire, Almine Rech, New York, NY, 2021
- Second Nature, Almine Rech, online, New York, NY, 2020
- And Everything Was True, HEART Herning Museum of Contemporary Art, Herning, Denmark, 2019
- Not That We Don't, Almine Rech, London, England, 2019
- Tennis Elbow, The Journal Gallery, New York, NY, 2019
- Coast unclear seeks rained parade, Galerie Sébastien Bertrand, Geneva, Switzerland, 2018
- Of false beaches and butter money, Almine Rech, Paris, France, 2017
- Cats not fighting is a horrible sound as well, Galerie Division, Montreal, Canada, 2016
- Full-Size Body, Erotic Literature, Retrospective Gallery, Hudson, NY, 2015
- That's Something Else, My Sweet, Galerie Sébastien Bertrand, Geneva, Switzerland, 2015
- pissing, shmoozing and looking away, Galerie Division, Montreal, and Division Gallery, Toronto, Canada, 2015

== Publications ==
- Chloe Wise: Second Nature, 2021, Almine Rech Editions
- Chloe Wise, 2016, Division Gallery (Canada) and Galerie Sebastien Bertrand (Switzerland)

== Collections ==
- Institute of Contemporary Art, Miami, FL, US
- The Julia Stoschek Collection, Dusseldorf, Germany
- The Hammer Museum, Los Angeles, CA
- National Gallery of Canada, Ottawa, ON
