= Anna-Eva Bergman =

Norwegian artist (1909–1987)

Anna-Eva Bergman (29 May 1909 – 24 July 1987) was a Norwegian abstract expressionist artist. She was a modernist artist and part of the School of Paris. Her abstract paintings were often inspired by nature and based on abstracted motifs.

== Biography ==
Bergman was born in Stockholm, Sweden as the child of a Swedish father and a Norwegian mother. Her parents divorced shortly after her birth, and she moved with her mother to Norway. She attended the Norwegian National Academy of Fine Arts (1926–1928). In 1928, she accompanied her mother to Vienna and became a student at the Kunstgewerbeschule.

In Paris she met the German abstract expressionist artist Hans Hartung (1904–1989). The two were married in 1929, and lived in Paris and in Germany, and later in Menorca. Problems along with Bergman's failing health led to the couple's divorce in 1939. Bergman returned to Norway and was married to factory owner Fridhjof Lange (1895–1988) from 1944 to 1952. She divorced Lange and in 1957 she was remarried to Hartung. The couple settled in Antibes, France in 1973. She died at Grasse, France.

Bergman's first exhibition was at the Autumn Exhibition in Oslo during 1948. She later had exhibitions at Stockholm, Paris, Nuremberg and Hanover. Her work is included in the collection of the Musée national des beaux-arts du Québec.

The Foundation Hartung Bergman (Fondation Hans Hartung et Anna-Eva Bergman) at Antibes maintains a public display of the works of Hans Hartung and Anna-Eva Bergman.

In 2023 her work was included in the exhibition Action, Gesture, Paint: Women Artists and Global Abstraction 1940-1970 at the Whitechapel Gallery in London.

== See also ==
- Finnmark, Winter
