= Action, Gesture, Paint: Women Artists and Global Abstraction 1940–1970 =

Art exhibition at Whitechapel Gallery in 2023

Action, Gesture, Paint: Women Artists and Global Abstraction 1940–1970 was an art exhibition held at the Whitechapel Gallery from 9 February 2023 through 7 May 2023. The exhibit presented 150 mid-century abstract paintings by 81 women artists. The show included artists from Asia, Europe, North America, and South America.

The Guardian review discussed the breadth and depth of the show, stating that "not everything is equally distinguished, powerful, or even individual. With its clamour of voices, approaches, touches, tempos, styles, its wild differences in scale, surface treatment, materiality and intention, there are surprises and discoveries here, great things and dismal things, anxious things and angry things." Time Out recommended the show but found it too large and the techniques too similar among the artists. Artforum rated the show as a "must see", The Art Newspaper subtitled their review "An ambitious exhibition at London's Whitechapel Gallery will celebrate the female artists from around the world who, against the odds, helped redefine art in the post-war period." The New York Times review discusses how Abstract expressionism was occurring around the world, when it is often associated just with New York City and men.

== Artists ==
The following artists were included in the show:

- Mary Abbott
- Etel Adnan
- Maliheh Afnan
- Ruth Armer
- Gillian Ayres
- Ida Barbarigo
- Noemí Di Benedetto
- Anna-Eva Bergman
- Janice Biala
- Bernice Bing
- Sandra Blow
- Dusti Bongé
- Chinyee
- Wook-kyung Choi
- Jay DeFeo
- Martha Edelheit
- Amaranth Ehrenhalt
- Asma Fayoumi
- Lilly Fenichel
- Perle Fine
- Else Fischer-Hansen
- Audrey Flack
- Elna Fonnesbech-Sandberg
- Juana Francés
- Helen Frankenthaler
- Sonia Gechtoff
- Judith Godwin
- Gloria Gómez-Sánchez
- Elsa Gramcko
- Sarah Grilo
- Grace Hartigan
- Lilian Holt
- Buffie Johnson
- Yuki Katsura
- Helen Khal
- Elaine de Kooning
- Lee Krasner
- Bice Lazzari
- Lifang
- Bertina Lopes
- Margaret Mellis
- Marta Minujín
- Joan Mitchell
- Aiko Miyawaki
- Yolanda Mohalyi
- Nasreen Mohamedi
- Emiko Nakano
- Lea Nikel
- Tomie Ohtake
- Fayga Ostrower
- Mercedes Pardo
- Charlotte Park
- Betty Parsons
- Pat Passlof
- Alice Rahon
- Carol Rama
- Marie Raymond
- Judit Reigl
- Deborah Remington
- Britta Ringvall
- Erna Rosenstein
- Behjat Sadr
- Nadia Saikali
- Zilia Sánchez
- Fanny Sanín
- Miriam Schapiro
- Sarah Schumann
- Ethel Schwabacher
- Sonja Sekula
- Toko Shinoda
- Sylvia Snowden
- Janet Sobel
- Vivian Springford
- Franciszka Themerson
- Alma Thomas
- Yvonne Thomas
- Hedwig Thun
- Nína Tryggvadóttir
- Elsa Vaudrey
- Maria Helena Vieira da Silva
- Michael West
