= De la Cruz Collection =

Art museum in Miami, Florida

Coordinates: 25.81430°N 80.19501°W

The de la Cruz Collection was an art museum at 23 NE 41st Street, Miami, Florida, owned by the Cuban-born American businessman Carlos de la Cruz and his wife Rosa. It housed their art collection and was open to the public free of charge, from 2009 until its closure in 2024.

The de la Cruz Collection opened in 2009 and was housed in a 30,000 sq ft building, designed by John Marquette. The collection included works by Isa Genzken, Christopher Wool, Felix Gonzalez-Torres, Mark Bradford, Peter Doig, Dan Colen, Nate Lowman.

From 1998, ArtNews listed Rosa and Carlos de la Cruz in their worldwide survey of the "Top 200 Collectors".

The art museum closed permanently following Rosa's death in February 2024, and in May 2024, Christie's sold the 26 most desirable pieces at auction for a combined US$34.4 million.
