= Inès Longevial =

French painter (born 1990)

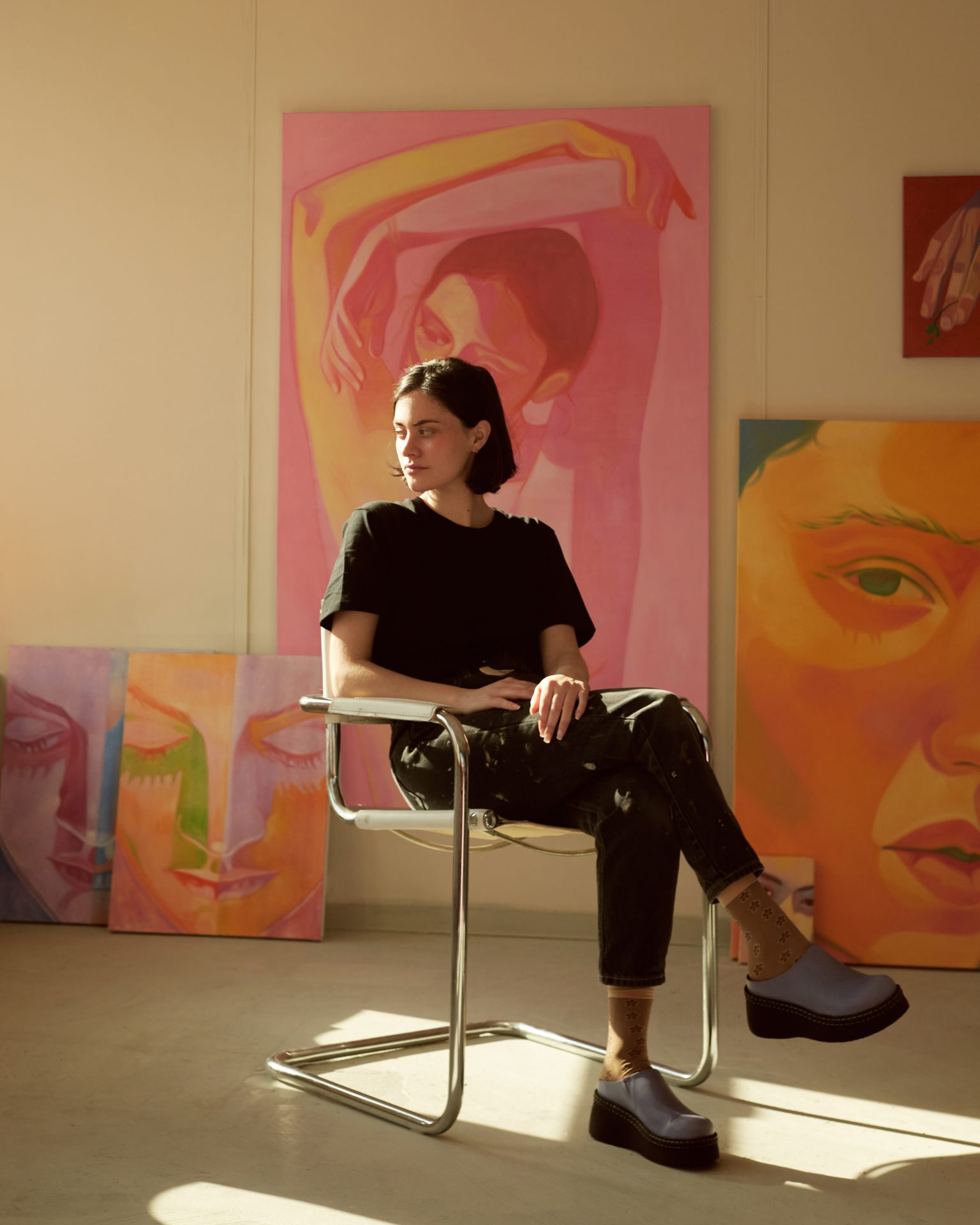
- Inès Longevial
- Born: 20 November 1990 (age 35)
- Website: https://ineslongevial.com/

Inès Longevial (born 20 November 1990) is a French painter currently working in Paris.

== Life and education ==
Inès Longevial grew up in the South-West of France, with family in the Basque Country, allowing her to be close to Spanish culture. Her mother encouraged her art. She began drawing and painting at the age of 7.

In her family library, she encountered the works of Picasso, Matisse, and Modgliani. She subsequently studied Niki de Saint-Phalle, Paula Modersohn-Becker, Georgia O'Keeffe, and screenwriter Pedro Almodóvar, who all influenced her work.

She earned a Baccalauréat sciences et technologies du design et des arts appliqués (STD2A) in 2011 and a Diplôme supérieur d’arts appliqués (DSAA) in 2013.

She first began showing her work on Instagram, where she garnered over 178,000 followers. She moved to Paris at age 23.

== Career ==
In 2016, her paintings were exhibited at Galerie M in Toulouse.

Her first solo exhibit was Sous Le Soleil in Los Angeles at the HVW8 Gallery in 2017. Subsequently, she appeared on the cover of the magazine Juxtapoz.

In 2018, she had another solo exhibit at Galerie M Toulouse, Je Pleure Comme Je Ris. The painter performed a residency / exhibition entitled Je Suis Une Couleur in October 2018 in San Francisco for the Chandran Gallery.

That same year, she was chosen to design the new bottle Evian and Badoit in limited edition with the agency BETC.

She has also collaborated with brands including Nike, Levi’s, Wad, and Stance.

In 2019, she self-produced her first Parisian exhibition at the Tournelles Gallery.

In 2021, she had an exhibition at Les Grandes Serres de Pantin, staged by contemporary art gallery Ketabi Projects, which seeks to "introduce and promote the work of a new generation of contemporary artists from France and abroad”. Founder Charlotte Ketabi-Lebard described Longevial as “an exceptional artist, a fine portraitist and colourist,” saying that “her work resonates strongly with our time. What really touches me is that she depicts our generation of women in all of its opposites, between a soft tenderness and a deaf violence."

She published her first monograph book, presenting a significant selection of paintings and sketches, in September 2023.

She took part in the Paris+ par Art Basel and Art Basel Miami Beach in 2024. She is currently represented by the gallery Almine Rech, with a co-representation by Ketabi Bourdet in France.

== Style and subject ==
Longevial’s oil paintings and drawings focus on two primary themes of femininity and nature. Expansive, often minimal portraits and fragments of feminine bodies are examined closely through light and color, with different palettes reflecting different emotions. She "approaches her memories in color and gives form to candid and absorbed faces that embody the nostalgia of seasons, sunsets, shades of light, and caresses." Her large oil portraits on canvas and paper "take the appearance of a landscape" and seek to "make the face speak" through unique manipulations of light, shadow, and color. She cites self portraiture as her favorite genre and playground, giving her the "freedom to follow an imaginary and poetic dream." She is inspired by "he variations of light as they convey and capture an impression, a sensation, a feeling." Her work is described as having a "melancholic sweetness."

Through subtle facial expressions and details of posture, the artist seeks to "reclaim her body, to assert her femininity."

Through depicting silent yet expressive women, Longevial says she would like to "portray a body that is not particularly eroticised, a body that takes full control of its own power."

== Exhibitions ==
=== 2017 ===
Sous le soleil HVW8 Gallery, Los Angeles, US

=== 2018 ===
Je suis une couleur Chandran Gallery, San Francisco, US

Four Conversations - Group show HVW8 Gallery, Berlin, Germany

=== 2019 ===
Grandes espérances Chandran Gallery, New York, US

Œuvres récentes Galerie des Tournelles, Paris, France

=== 2020 ===
I Miss You Chandran Gallery, Online

=== 2021 ===
Chaotic Energy Christie’s, Paris, France

Before the sun sinks low Ketabi Projects, Pantin, France

Opening show - Group show Musée National de la Faïencerie de Gien, France

Nouvelles Résolutions - Group show Ketabi Projects, Paris, France

Salon de Peinture - Group show Almine Rech, New York, US

Artistes à la Une - Group show Monnaie de Paris, Paris, France

Art Paris - Art Fair Ketabi Projects, Paris, France

=== 2022 ===
En chair et en os Van de Weghe, New York, US

L’heure magique Fine Art Museum, Agen, France

Tomorrow is your lucky day FIAF, New York, US

World on paper Ketabi Projects, Paris, France

Oat milk tears Journal Gallery, New York, US

=== 2023 ===
Pourfendue Almine Rech, London, UK

Body Double - Group show Ketabi Bourdet / Penske, Paris, France

Perchée Ketabi Bourdet, Paris, France

Modigliani and the Modern Portrait - Group show Nassau County Museum of Art, New York, US

Je est un autre - Group show Chateau La Coste, Provence, France

Feeling of Light - Group show Almine Rech, Bruxelles, Belgique

Art 021 - Art Fair Almine Rech, Shanghai, China

Art Bruxelles - Art Fair Almine Rech, Bruxelles, Belgique

Art Paris - Art Fair Ketabi Bourdet, Paris, France

amfAR Gala Cap Eden Roc, Antibes, France

=== 2024 ===
Les Silences du Désir Almine Rech, Shanghai, China

Le jour des peintres Musée d’Orsay, Paris, France

Art Brussels Almine Rech, Brussels, Belgium

Art Paris Almine Rech, Paris, France

Art Basel Hong Kong Almine Rech, Shanghai, China

=== 2025 ===
Visages - Group show Almine Rech, New York, USA

Une chambre à soi - Group show Château La Coste, Provence, France
