= Nadia Saikali =

Lebanese artist

Nadia Saikali (born 1936 in Beirut) is a Lebanese Abstract Expressionist painter. She attended the Lebanese Academy of Fine Arts (ALBA), the Académie de la Grande Chaumière, and the L'École des Arts Decoratifs.

Her work is in the collection of the Barjeel Art Foundation. In 2020 work was included in the Sharjah Art Museum's exhibition The Memory Sews Together Events That Hadn’t Previously Met. In 2022 her work was included in the exhibition Manifesto of Fragility: Beirut and The Golden Sixties at the Gropius Bau in Berlin. The show traveled to the Lyon Biennial in Lyon, France. It then travel to the Mathaf: Arab Museum of Modern Art.

In 2023 her work was included in the exhibition Action, Gesture, Paint: Women Artists and Global Abstraction 1940-1970 at the Whitechapel Gallery in London.
