= Carlos de la Cruz =

Cuban-born American businessman

- Born: Carlos M. de la Cruz Sr. Havana, Cuba
- Education: Phillips Academy; University of Pennsylvania; University of Miami
- Occupation: Businessman
- Known for: De la Cruz Collection
- Title: Chairman, CC1 Companies, Inc
- Spouse: Rosa de la Cruz (m. 1962; died 2024)
- Children: 5
- Relatives: Stefano Bonfiglio (former son-in-law)

Carlos M. de la Cruz Sr. is a Cuban-born American businessman, the chairman of CC1 Companies, Inc. which include Coca-Cola Puerto Rico Bottlers, CC1 Beer Distributors, Inc., Coca-Cola Bottlers Trinidad & Tobago, and Florida Caribbean Distillers. The companies together employ 2,500 people and have annual sales of $1 billion.

== Early life ==
Born in Havana, Cuba, he also lived in New York City and Madrid, Spain, and has been a resident of Miami, Florida, since 1975.

De la Cruz received his high school diploma from Phillips Academy, Andover, Massachusetts, in 1959; a bachelor's degree in economics, an MBA from the Wharton School, University of Pennsylvania, in 1962 and 1963; and a juris doctor from the University of Miami School of Law in 1979.

== Career ==
He is a senior trustee and was the chairman of the board of trustees of the University of Miami from 1999 to 2001. He is a member of the Council on Foreign Relations. From 1993 to 1995 he was chairman of United Way of Dade County, and campaign chairman in 1991. He has been on the boards of Georgetown University, Belen Jesuit Preparatory School, Florida International University, the Dade Foundation, the Business Assistance Center, and Miami Partners for Progress.

A supporter of interdisciplinary studies, he endowed the de la Cruz-Mentschikoff Professor of Law and Economics chair at the University of Miami Law School and the de la Cruz Doctoral Candidates Fellows in Behavioral Finance at the Wharton School.

== Personal life ==
He and his wife, Rosa de la Cruz, have been married since 1962. They have five children and live in Key Biscayne, Florida.

They are collectors of contemporary art. In 2009 they opened the De la Cruz Collection, a 30,000 square foot private museum which shows their collection in the Design District of Miami. The museum is open to the public free of charge and conducts educational programs.

Rosa died in February 2024, and in May 2024 Christie's sold the 26 most desirable pieces at auction for US$34.4 million.

Their daughter, jewelry designer Rosa de la Cruz Bonfiglio, was married to the Italian businessman, Stefano Bonfiglio, and they had four sons together, but later divorced.

== Awards ==
He has received the Alexis de Tocqueville Award from United Way; the Silver Medallion Brotherhood Award from the National Conference of Christians and Jews; the Distinguished Service Award from Florida International University; the Joseph Wharton Award from the University of Pennsylvania; the Social Responsibility Award from the Urban League; the Simon Wiesenthal Foundation Award; the Presidential Medal from Georgetown University; the Lawyers in Leadership Award from the Center for Ethics & Public Service of the University of Miami; the New American Award from Catholic Charities Legal Services; and the Humanitarian Award from American Red Cross.
