= Else Fischer-Hansen =

Danish artist (1905–1996)

- Born: 29 April 1905; Copenhagen
- Died: 30 May 1993 (aged 88); Copenhagen
- Known for: Painting
- Movement: Abstract Expressionism

Else Fischer-Hansen (29 April 1905 – 30 May 1996) was a Danish painter who specialized in Abstract works consisting of a few strong colours on a light background.

== Biography ==
Born in Copenhagen, Fischer-Hansen did not take up painting until she reached her twenties. She spent a year at Emil Rannow's school of painting in Copenhagen (1927–28) before travelling to Italy to study painting. She also attended the graphic arts school in Nice. In 1929, her paintings of nudes were accepted at the Artists Autumn Exhibition (Kunstnernes Efterårsudstilling).

Fischer-Hansen's early work had been in the Naturalist style but in the 1930s, probably inspired by Henri Matisse, it became increasingly Abstract. Her Komposition exhibited in 1933 shows that she had already begun to use colour without distinguishable motifs. Onsdag (Wednesday) from 1941 consists solely of ovals, perhaps representing heads. Her paintings of the sea, light and air are created in a highly simplified abstract form, often with just a few strong colours on a light background.

She also worked with other media including ceramics, weaving and stained glass. In 1971, she completed her glass mosaic decoration of Herlev Hospital.

Else Fischer-Hansen was married to the painter Egon Mathiesen (1907–1976).

In 2023 her work was included in the exhibition Action, Gesture, Paint: Women Artists and Global Abstraction 1940-1970 at the Whitechapel Gallery in London.

== Awards ==
In 1979, Fischer-Hansen was awarded the Eckersberg Medal and, in 1986, the Thorvaldsen Medal.
