= Stefano Bonfiglio =

Italian businessman

- Born: Stefano Alberto Bonfiglio; February 1964 (age 62)
- Education: Georgetown University; University of Pennsylvania; Wharton Business School
- Occupation: private equity manager
- Known for: Founder and partner, Stirling Square Capital Partners
- Board member of: Stirling Square Capital Partners; Walkabout Foundation
- Spouses: Rosa de la Cruz Bonfiglio; Carolina Gonzalez-Bunster
- Relatives: Rolando Gonzalez-Bunster (father-in-law); Carlos de la Cruz (ex-father-in-law)

Stefano Alberto Bonfiglio (born February 1964) is an Italian businessman, the co-founder and managing partner of Stirling Square Capital Partners, a London-based private equity firm that invests in companies valued between €50 million and €500 million.

== Early life ==
Stefano Alberto Bonfiglio was born in Italy in February 1964. He has a bachelor's degree in International Economics from Georgetown University, a master's degree in International Studies from the University of Pennsylvania, and an MBA from the Wharton Business School.

== Career ==
Bonfiglio worked for Bankers Trust in New York and Milan for eight years, then became a managing director with Donaldson, Lufkin & Jenrette, and then was co-founder and managing director of Tetragon Partners, a private equity firm.

Stirling Square was co-founded by Bonfiglio in 2002, and has "total committed capital in excess of €1 billion".

== Personal life ==
Bonfiglio was married to jewelry designer Rosa de la Cruz Bonfiglio, the daughter of Carlos de la Cruz, a Cuban-born American businessman and art collector, and they had four sons together.

In 2010, Bonfiglio was in a relationship with TV presenter Trinny Woodall.

In 2014, Bonfiglio married Carolina Gonzalez-Bunster, daughter of Rolando Gonzalez-Bunster, a US-based Argentine businessman. She is a former Goldman Sachs banker and the founder of the Walkabout Foundation, of which Bonfiglio is a director.

They live in Knightsbridge, London. Their wedding was attended by Hillary and Bill Clinton.
