= Minjung Kim =

Korean paper artist (born 1962)

- 김민정
- Born: 1962 (age 63–64); Gwangju, South Korea
- Education: Hongik University (BFA, MFA); Brera Academy (MFA)
- Occupation: Hanji Paper Artist
- Notable work: ‘The Light, The Shade, The Depth’(2015 Venice Biennale) 'Traces' (2024, Art Basel) 'Story' (2006, Met Museum)
- Website: https://minjung-kim.com/

Minjung Kim (Korean: 김민정; born 1962) is a Korean contemporary paper artist that specializes in hanji paper art, ink painting, and calligraphy. Kim has had work displayed in museums internationally, the Gwangju Biennale in 2004 and 2018, Jeonnam International Sumuk Biennale in 2025, and the Venice Biennale in 2015.

Between 1991 and 2026, Kim has had 68 solo exhibitions in museums in Europe, North America, and Asia. She has also been featured in group exhibitions on women in abstract art, contemporary landscape painting styles, contemporary Korean art, the 'feeling of light' in a painting as inspired by Kora of Sicyon, and many more.

== Biography ==
Kim was raised in rural Gwangju, Jeolla-do, South Korea. Her father was a printing shop owner. Kim began calligraphy art and experimenting with paper scraps as a child. According to Kim, she knew that she would be an artist when she was young since she won all of the local art competitions.

Kim completed her Bachelor of Fine Arts and Master of Fine Arts (1985) at Hongik University in Seoul, South Korea. She moved to Milan, Italy in 1991 to complete a Master of Fine Arts at Brera Academy.

Kim is currently based between New York City, United States and St. Paul de Vence, France

== Art technique ==
Kim burns the edges of hanji, traditional Korean paper, and further manipulates it create minimal collages. She folds, cuts, tears, sculpts, and glues the hanji scraps to create a full minimalist, abstract picture(s).

She told Forbes that she chose paper as her medium because "You can make a web, a painting, you can tear it, you can cut it, you can bond it... My life is a diaspora. Paper, you can roll it, you can take with you. It’s like your skin.”

Her artistic inspirations include minimalist and abstract artists, including Constantin Brâncusi, Brice Marden, Guo Xi, Briget Riley, and painters from the Joseon Dynasty.

== Solo exhibitions ==
Exhibition	Dates	Gallery	Location
Mountain	TBD 2026	Almine Rech	Gstaad, Switzerland
The Pulse of Ink, Paper and Fire	Jan 21 — Mar 7, 2026	Almine Rech	Brussels, Belgium
Survey of Works	January 5, 2026 – January 31, 2026	Space Gallery	Gustavia, Saint Barthélémy, France
Repetitions	2026	Robilant+Voena Gallery	Milan, Italy
Traces of Silence	October 2, 2025 - November 22, 2025	Galerie Commeter	Hamburg, Germany
One after the Other	August 27, 2025 - October 19, 2025	Gallery Hyundai	Seoul, South Korea
Mountain	Nov 9, 2024 —Feb 23, 2025	Fondation Maeght	Saint-Paul de Vence, France
Regeneration	Apr 26 — May 25, 2024	Almine Rech	Paris, France
Repetición	February 24 – April 3, 2024	Galerie Nordenhake	Mexico City, Mexico
Minjung Kim	December 19, 2023 - January 28, 2024	Robilant+Voena	St. Moritz, Switzerland
Burning Gravity	September 21– October 30, 2023	Almine Rech & Sotheby's	Monaco
Timeless	September 16 – November 3, 2021	Galerie Commeter	Hamburg, Germany
Long Street of Timeless History of Phasing Grey Snow into Water	September 15 – October 30, 2021	Volker Diehl Gallery	Berlin, Germany
Timeless	February 19, 2019 – March 28, 2021	Hyundai Gallery	Seoul, South Korea
Minjung Kim	March 4, 2020 - March 27, 2021	Hill Art Foundation	New York, NY, USA
Minjung Kim Solo Exhibition	September 29, 2019 – March 22, 2020	Langen Foundation	Neuss, Germany
Minjung Kim	July 5 –September 15, 2019	Catherine Issert Gallery	Saint Paul de Vence, France
Minjung Kim	June 19 – September 5, 2019	Galería Cayón	Mahón, Menorca, Spain
Mountains	December 29, 2018	Robilant+Voena Gallery	St. Moritz, Switzerland
The Memory of Process	January 25 – March 10, 2018	White Cube	London, England, UK
Making the Void, Filling the Void	August 22– November 25, 2018	Gwanju Museum of Art	Gwangju, South Korea
Phasing	2017	Patrick Heide Contemporary Art	London, England, UK
Cendre & Lumière	2017	Musée des Arts Asiatiques	Nice, France
Oneness	2017	Hermès Foundation	Singapore
Paper, Ink and Fire: After the Process	September 1 –October 8, 2017	Hyundai Gallery	Seoul, South Korea
Phasing	2016	Galerie Volker Diehl	Berlin, Germany
Minjung Kim Solo Exhibition	2016	Leslie Sacks Gallery	Santa Monica, CA, USA
Traces	2015	OCI Museum of Art	Seoul, South Korea
The Light, The Shade, The Depth	2015	Luxembourg & Dayan	Venice Biennale, Italy
Oko	2014		New York, NY, USA
Sound of Light	2014	Galerie Commeter	Hamburg, Germany
Minjung Kim Solo Exhibition	2014	Studio d'Arte Raffaelli	Trento, Italy
Art Genève 2014	2014	Artgèneve Salon d'Art	Geneva, Switzerland
Minjung Kim Solo Exhibition	2013	Patrick Heide Contemporary Art	London, England, UK
Sound of Light	2012	Museo d'Arte Contemporanea Roma	Rome, Italy
Minjung Kim Solo Exhibition	2012	Leslie Sacks Gallery	Brentwood, CA, USA
Minjung Kim Solo Exhibition	2012	Galleria Sahrai	Milan, Italy
Minjung Kim Solo Exhibition	2010	Galleria Sant'Angelo	Biella, Italy
Minjung Kim Solo Exhibition	2009	Galleria Valeria Bella Stampe	Milan, Italy
Minjung Kim Solo Exhibition	2009	Patrick Heide Contemporary Art	London, England, UK
Minjung Kim Solo Exhibition	2009	Galleria Ermanno Tedeschi	Rome, Italy
Minjung Kim Solo Exhibition	2008	Galleria Ermanno Tedeschi	Turin, Italy
Minjung Kim Solo Exhibition	2008	Robilant+Voena Gallery	London, England, UK
Minjung Kim Solo Exhibition	2008	Gallerie Mudimadrie	Antwerp, Belgium
Minjung Kim Solo Exhibition	2007	Guanshanyue Art Museum	Shenzen, China
Minjung Kim Solo Exhibition	2007	Leslie Sacks Gallery	Brentwood, CA, USA
Minjung Kim Solo Exhibition	2007	Copenhagen Art Gallery	Copenhagen, Denmark
Minjung Kim Solo Exhibition	2007	Patrick Heide Contemporary Art	London, England, UK
Minjung Kim Solo Exhibition	2007	Giudecca795 Galleria d'Arte	Venice, Italy
Minjung Kim Solo Exhibition	2006	Montecarlo Art Gallery	Milan, Italy
Minjung Kim Solo Exhibition	2006	Fondazione Palazzo Bricherasio	Turin, Italy
Minjung Kim Solo Exhibition	2006	Galleria Valeria Bella Stampe	Milan, Italy
Minjung Kim Solo Exhibition	2004	Arte 92	Milan, Italy
Minjung Kim Solo Exhibition	2004	Ikos	Milan, Italy
Minjung Kim Solo Exhibition	2003	Museo Comunale di Ascona	Ascona, Switzerland
Minjung Kim Solo Exhibition	2003	Leslie Sacks Gallery	Brentwood, CA, USA
Minjung Kim Solo Exhibition	2003	Galerie Patrick Gramer	Geneva, Switzerland
Minjung Kim Solo Exhibition	2002	Galleria Recalcati	Turin, Italy
Minjung Kim Solo Exhibition	2002	Copenhagen Art Gallery	Copenhagen, Denmark
Minjung Kim Solo Exhibition	2002	Galleria Cafisco	Milan, Italy
Minjung Kim Solo Exhibition	1999	Wickiser Gallery	New York, NY, USA
Minjung Kim Solo Exhibition	1999	Galerie Patrick Gramer	Geneva, Switzerland
Minjung Kim Solo Exhibition	1998	Galleria Cafisco	Milan, Italy
Minjung Kim Solo Exhibition	1997	Cappella di Villa Ruffolo	Ravello, Italy
Minjung Kim Solo Exhibition	1996	Galleria Arte Borgogna	Milan, Italy
Minjung Kim Solo Exhibition	1996	Galleria Kontraste	Forte dei Marmi, Italy
Minjung Kim Solo Exhibition	1991	Baik Song Gallery	Seoul, South Korea
Minjung Kim Solo Exhibition	1991	Injae Art Museum	Gwangju, South Korea

== Festival exhibitions ==
Artwork	Festival	Dates	Location
	Somewhere over the yellow sea: 4th annual Jeonnam International Sumuk Biennale	August 30, 2025 - October 31, 2025	Jeollanam-do, South Korea
Traces	Art Basel Unlimited 2024		Basel, Switzerland
	14th Gwanju Biennale	April 7 - July 9, 2023	Gwangju, South Korea
	Enter Art Fair 2022	August 24 – 27 2023	Copenhagen, Denmark
	Enter Art Fair 2021	August 25 – 28, 2022	Copenhagen, Denmark
	Imagined Borders: 12th Gwangju Biennale 2018	September 7 – November 11, 2018	Gwangju, South Korea
The Balance of Non-Sculpting	Changwon Sculpture Biennale 2018	4 September - 14 October 2018	Chanwon, South Korea
The Light, The Shade, The Depth	2015 Venice Biennale	May 9 – November 22, 2015	Venice, Italy
