= Judit Reigl =

Hungarian painter (1923–2020)

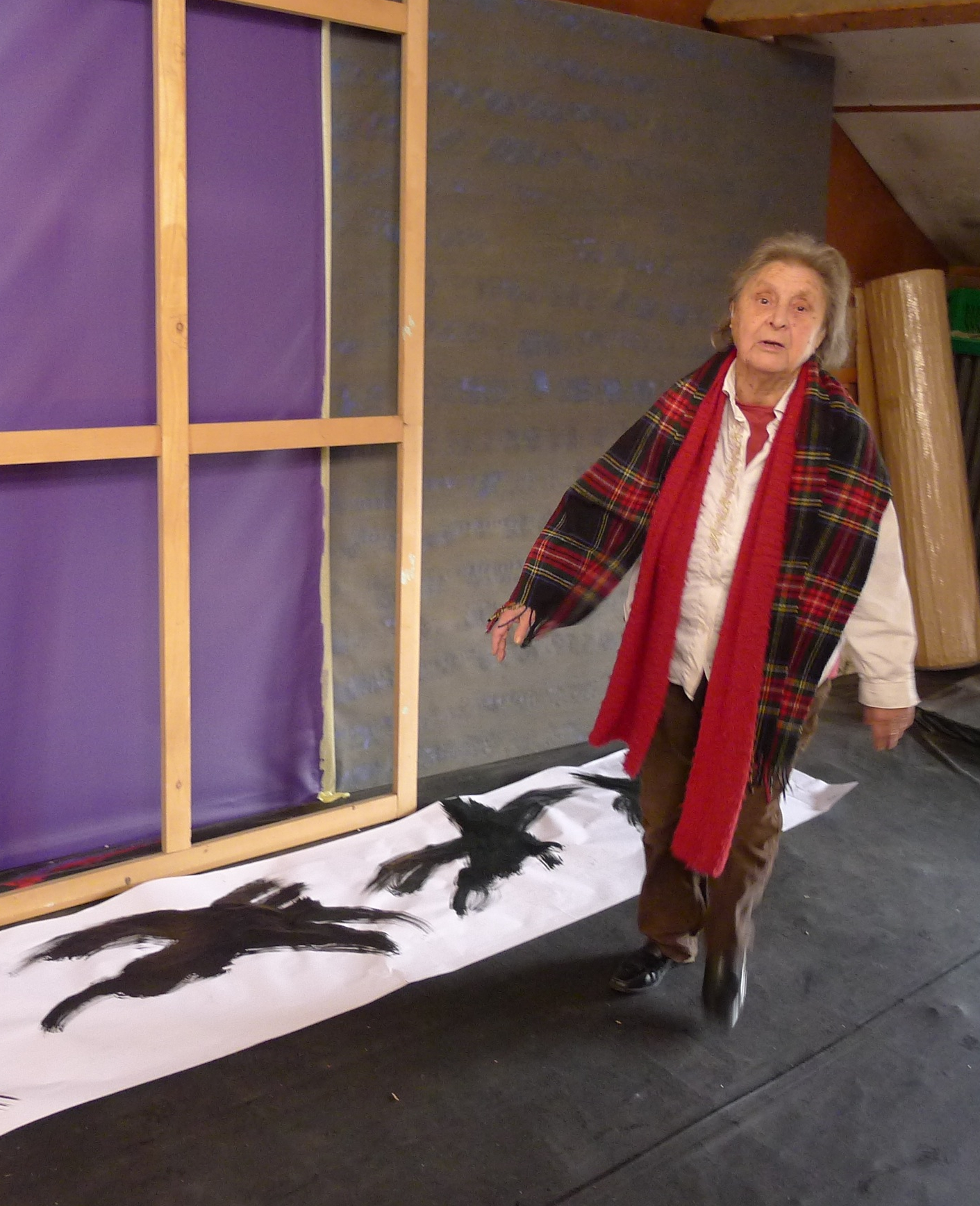
- Judit Reigl in her studio in Marcoussis, February 2012
- Born: 1 May 1923; Kapuvár, Hungary
- Died: 7 August 2020 (aged 97); Marcoussis, France
- Known for: Painter
- Movement: Abstract Expressionism
- Website: judit-reigl.com

Judit Reigl (née Némedy; 1 May 1923 – 6 August 2020) was a Hungarian painter who lived in France.

== Biography ==
Reigl was born on 1 May 1923 in Kapuvár, Hungary. She attended the Hungarian University of Fine Arts from 1942 to 1945 where she was the student of the celebrated painter István Szőnyi. She was awarded a scholarship from the Academy of Hungary in Rome which allowed her to study in Italy between 1947 and 1948. During her studies there she encountered Byzantine icons, the mosaics of Ravenna, the works of Giotto and Masaccio and the paintings of Venice's Giorgione and Titian amongst others.

In 1950, when the Iron Curtain had divided Hungary and Western Europe, Reigl succeeded in crossing into Western Europe after eight previous attempts. She explained that her home country of Hungary solely commissioned her to paint portraits of ruling Communist leaders such as Stalin, Rákosi and Gerő, and so her defection to the West was necessary to preserve her artistic freedom. Reigl eventually reached Paris by crossing through Austria, Switzerland, Germany and Belgium where she lived from 1950 to 1963. In 1963 she moved to Marcoussis (Île-de-France).

Reigl acquired French nationality by naturalization. She died on 7 August 2020 in Marcoussis, France.

== Influences and impact ==
Four years after arriving in Paris, in May 1945, Simon Hantaï, a fellow Hungarian émigré, introduced Reigl to André Breton. Known as the Pope of Surrealism, Breton welcomed Reigl into his circle of Surrealist artists and their influence is evident in her early work. She read authors such as Le Comte de Lautréamont and Arthur Rimbaud, whose texts were seminal for the Surrealists. Breton was impressed with Reigl's art, and one of her most important pieces, They Have an INsatiable THirst for Infinity, particularly stood out. Reigl was interested in Surrealism and Andre Breton because of her interest in automatic writing. After being introduced to one another, Riegl soon started to spend time with the surrealists. Reigi had a relatively short phase of focusing on surrealism but she would become an important bridge between surrealists and the younger generation of artists that would be associated with lyrical abstraction in the future. Reigi would soon be known for pushing the practice of automatism in surrealism by constantly striving for a level of absolute automatism, both psychologically and physically. Reigi talked about her experiences with automatism and stated "My entire body took part in the work, in the wake of my arms wide open. I wrote in the given space with gestures, beats, impulses". Reigl eventually moved away from Surrealism and towards Lyrical Abstraction. Georges Mathieu, one of the greatest French Lyrical Abstractionists, was one of Reigl's significant influences during this period. Both series garnered Reigl much success in France as well as in West Germany and in the United States, where she familiarized herself with the American Abstract Expressionists such as Jackson Pollock, Willem de Kooning and Franz Kline.

Reigl exhibited her work in France beginning in 1954. For her first exhibition, the prologue to the catalogue was written by André Breton. Her works are primarily found in the collections of French museums, including the Musée d'Art Moderne de la Ville de Paris, Musée National d'Art Moderne and Musée de Grenoble. Her works were not displayed in Hungary until the mid-2000s.

== Artwork ==
Reigl's early works from her Surrealist period combine elements of photo collage with a mixture of figurative and more abstract elements (Incomparable Pleasure, 1952–53). She later expanded her use of collages from 1953 to 1955 using images from popular magazines and newspapers. Although these smaller photo collages weren't included in her inaugural exhibition at André Breton's galerie À l'Étoile scellée, they still align with the Surrealist movement through their bizarre juxtapositions, dreamlike scenarios and transfigured bodies. Most of her paintings which were included in the show at galerie À l'Étoile scellée are more abstract, the exhibited canvases were Reigl's first experimentation with automatic writing, a technique that recurs in various forms throughout her oeuvre. Reigl's automatism arode from instinctive gestures of her body and showcases movement, levitation, tension and changes in processes, rhythms and roots of existence on spectacular large canvases. Figurative- and non-figurative representation was for her a question of encoding and de-coding but may also be anthropomorphic.

Reigl used her body as her primary instrument when creating the series Outburst (Éclatement) which she began in 1955. The Outbursts series is different from her earlier paintings with automatic writing in that they no longer used improvised metal tools to make spontaneous gestural marks. She began with throwing thick industrial pigment mixed with linseed oil onto the canvas with her hands and continued by vigorously scraping it from the center to the edges with a tool. In a 1956 Outburst in the collection of the Solomon R. Guggenheim Museum, the relatively spare composition is punctuated by thick impastos or forceful marks. The artist later explained this time in her life as a transitional period when she severed her ties with the Surrealists. The Outbursts are explosions of mass, radiating from a center as bursts of pure energy.

For her following series Mass Writing (Écriture en masse), Reigl applied large volumes of thick, slow-drying black pigment to the canvas using a blade or a stick, and then painted with upward strokes. In these works, the black areas are dispersed outward toward the edges of the canvas. While working on these canvases, Reigl inadvertently began in 1958 working on an innovative oeuvre of paintings called Guanos, in which she reworked rejected canvases that had been covering the floor of her studio. The textured surface of these paintings evoke the archeological which was further affirmed by the artist herself when she referred to the canvases becoming "fertile ground" for new paintings.

Some of her subsequent series include Man, Drap/décodage and Facing... (Face à...). They display Reigl's desire for liberation from her own body by investigating the human figure. Other Reigl series such as Writings after Music (Écritures d'après musique) and Unfolding (Déroulement) are based around the central theme of music. In Writings after Music, she transcribes musical notes into concrete visual signs. Scholars characterize the creative process of Unfolding as a type of dance in which the artist develops a unique form of visual calligraphy by combining gesture and innovative painting techniques.

Reigl's work is in the collection of the Buffalo AKG Art Museum the Cleveland Museum of Art, the Hungarian National Gallery, the Metropolitan Museum of Art, the Museum of Fine Arts, Houston, the Museum of Modern Art, the Musée d'Art Moderne de Paris, the Solomon R. Guggenheim Museum, the Tate, and the Toledo Museum of Art.

Reigl's work was included in the 2021 exhibition Women in Abstraction at the Centre Pompidou. In 2023 her work was included in the exhibition Action, Gesture, Paint: Women Artists and Global Abstraction 1940-1970 at the Whitechapel Gallery in London.

== Awards ==
- Guggenheim International Award (New York City, 1964)
- Carnegie Award (Pittsburgh, 1967–68)
- Commander's Cross of Order of Merit of the Republic of Hungary (Budapest, 2008)
- Kossuth Prize (Budapest, 2011)
