= Juana Francés =

Spanish painter (1924-1990)

Juana Concepción Francés
- Born: 31 July 1924; Altea, Spain
- Died: 9 March 1990 (aged 65); Madrid, Spain
- Known for: painter
- Movement: Abstract Expressionism

Juana Francés (1924 – 1990) was a Spanish Abstract Expressionist painter. She was born on 31 July 1924 in Altea, Spain. She attended the Real Academia de Bellas Artes de San Fernando in Madrid. In 1957, she co-founded the El Paso (grupo) (El Paso/The Step) a Spanish Abstract Expressionism group. She died on 9 March 1990 in Madrid.

Her work was included in the 1954, 1960 and 1964 Venice Biennale. It was also included in the 1960 exhibition Before Picasso; After Miró at the Solomon R. Guggenheim Museum, as well as the 1962 Tate exhibition Modern Spanish Painting. In 2023, her work was included in the exhibition Action, Gesture, Paint: Women Artists and Global Abstraction 1940-1970 at the Whitechapel Gallery in London.

Her work is in the collection of the Museo Nacional Centro de Arte Reina Sofía.
