= Wook-kyung Choi =

Korean artist

- Born: 1940; Seoul, South Korea
- Died: 1985 (aged 44–45); Seoul, South Korea
- Known for: painter
- Movement: Abstract Expressionism

Wook-kyung Choi (1940–1985) was a Korean Abstract Expressionist painter. She was born in Seoul, South Korea in 1940. Choi attended Seoul National University, and then immigrated to the United States in 1964 where she studied at the Cranbrook Academy of Art and the Brooklyn Museum Art School. She acted as a transmitter of Korean Informel Art to The United States, a form of painting characterized by non-geometrical abstraction. This artistic movement was interpreted by many as a rebellion against the Korean state-led National Art Exhibition System (gukjeon), which preferred Academic Realism as its method of expression. During her career, she also studied and exhibited influences from other Abstract Expressionist artists such as Willem de Kooning, Robert Motherwell, and Mark Rothko.

In 1979 Choi permanently returned to South Korea where she taught at Yeungnam University and Duksung Women's University. Choi died in 1985 at the age of 45 in Seoul.

In 1987, the National Museum of Modern and Contemporary Art (MMCA) held a retrospective exhibit of Choi's work. In 2005, the Kukje Gallery in Seoul posthumously presented her art to the Korean public. The Kukje Gallery held another solo exhibition in 2016 focused on Choi's time in The U.S. titled the American Years 1960s–70s. In 2021, the National Museum of Modern and Contemporary Art held another exhibition of Choi's work entitled Wook-kyung Choi, Alice’s Cat.

Wook-kyung Choi's work was included in the 2021 exhibition Women in Abstraction at the Centre Pompidou. In 2023, Choi's art was included in the exhibition Action, Gesture, Paint: Women Artists and Global Abstraction 1940-1970 at the Whitechapel Gallery in London.
