= Elsa Vaudrey =

British artist

Elsa Vaudrey, 1943

Elsa Vaudrey or Elsa Vaudrey Barker-Mill (1905-1990) was a British painter. Vaudrey née Dun was born in Glasgow, Scotland in 1905. She attended the Glasgow School of Art. During World War II she was involved with the administration of the Stonefield Maternity Home located in London, known for promoting a vegetarian diet for its clientele. Married twice, her second husband was fellow artist Peter Vaudrey Barker-Mill in 1937. The couple had one child and were divorced in 1950. Vaudrey exhibited often at The Redfern Gallery, including a solo show in 1957. She died in 1990 the same year that the Fine Art Society held an exhibit of her later paintings.

In 2023 her work was included in the exhibition Action, Gesture, Paint: Women Artists and Global Abstraction 1940-1970 at the Whitechapel Gallery in London.
