= Chinyee =

Chinese-American painter (1929–2023)

Chinyee

Chinyee (1929 – June 2, 2023) was a Chinese-American Abstract Expressionist painter. She emigrated to the United States to study at the College of Mount Saint Vincent and went on to earn her MFA from New York University. In the mid-1960s Chinyee became involved with the United Nations, working in New York City, the Belgian Congo, and multiple other overseas UN missions.

== Biography ==
Chinyee was born in Nanjing, China in 1929. She had her first solo show at the Mi Chou Gallery in 1965. In 1997 her work was included in the exhibition Asian Traditions, Modern Expressions: Asian American Artists and Abstraction, 1945-1970 at the Zimmerli Art Museum at Rutgers University. In 2007 the Shanghai Art Museum held a retrospective of her work entitled A Lyrical Journey, Chinyee's 50-Year Retrospective. In 2023 her work was included in the exhibition Action, Gesture, Paint: Women Artists and Global Abstraction 1940-1970 at the Whitechapel Gallery in London. Chinyee died in New Jersey on June 2, 2023.
