= Zilia Sánchez Domínguez =

Cuban-born Puerto Rican artist (1926–2024)

- Born: Zilia Sánchez Domínguez; July 12, 1926; Havana, Cuba
- Died: December 18, 2024 (aged 98); San Juan, Puerto Rico
- Education: Academia Nacional de Bellas Artes San Alejandro
- Known for: Shaped canvases; abstract erotic forms; painting–sculpture hybrids
- Notable work: Soy Isla; Lunar (1980); Las Amazonas; Troyanas
- Movement: Abstract art; Minimalism (associated); Shaped canvas
- Partner: Victoria Ruiz
- Awards: Represented Cuba, São Paulo Art Biennial (1959); Represented Cuba, InterAmerican Biennial, Mexico City (1960); Participant, Havana Biennial; Participant, Venice Biennale (2017, 2024)

Zilia Sánchez Domínguez (12 July 1926 – 18 December 2024) was a Cuban-born, Puerto Rico-based abstract painter, sculptor, and arts educator. She started her career as a set designer for theatre groups in Cuba before the Cuban Revolution, eventually moving to New York to work as an abstract painter. She moved again to San Juan in 1971, living there for the remainder of her life and career. Sánchez Domínguez blurred the lines between sculpture and painting by creating canvases layered with three dimensional protrusions and shapes. Her works are minimal in color and have erotic overtones.

== Early life and education ==
Zilia Sánchez Domínguez was born on 12 July 1926, in Havana, Cuba, to a Spanish father and a Cuban mother. As a child she was neighbors with the well-known artist Víctor Manuel García Valdés, who - along with her father, an amateur painter - first began her interest in art.

In 1943, Sánchez Domínguez enrolled at the Escuela Nacional de Bellas Artes San Alejandro in Havana, one of Cuba's most prestigious art schools. She graduated in 1947. She had originally intended to become an architect, studying the subject for one semester in university, but switched to art-making as her focus. She gave multiple explanations for the shift, saying at times that the choice was a result of her dislike of the math required for architecture, and at other times saying she made the decision because of the Cuban Revolution.

== Life and career ==
=== 1950s: Early career in Cuba ===
After graduating university, Sánchez Domínguez had her first solo art exhibition in 1953, at Havana's Lyceum and Lawn Tennis Club. Her early paintings were primarily done in an abstract expressionist or Art Informel-inspired style with loose, messy brushstrokes and dark tones. Many of her early works also contained imagery and symbols associated with Afro-Cuban religious practices like Palo. In addition to painting, she worked extensively as a set designer in Havana, primarily for the experimental theater group Las Máscaras. She was also involved in anti-Batista politics and engaged with the artistic and intellectual group Sociedad Cultural Nuestro Tiempo.

Sánchez Domínguez became widely known in Cuba during her early career as an artist in the 1950s. During this period she also began to travel extensively throughout Europe, studying art and art conservation. While in Spain she saw the work of Antoni Tàpies, which would be influential on her own art. She represented Cuba in a group show at the São Paulo Art Biennial in fall 1959. In October 1959, following Fidel Castro's rise to power the same year, Sánchez Domínguez was included in the first post-Revolution edition of the country's annual salon exhibition of painting; party leaders and local critics faulted the exhibition for including such a large amount of abstract art, which they deemed incapable of supporting revolutionary politics.

=== 1960s: Move to New York ===
In September 1960, she represented Cuba in a group show at the second InterAmerican Biennial in Mexico City. She left Cuba in late 1960 and settled in New York. She said she left Cuba due to her concerns that her abstract style of art-making would not be well-received in a political environment that favored propagandistic art, as well as her fears as a lesbian of possible state repression. After moving to New York, she studied printmaking at the Pratt Institute. She also began working as an illustrator to support herself.

Around this period she started making her shaped canvas works, created with painted canvas materials infused with glue and stretched over found objects like wood and lengths of plastic. These paintings were much lighter in color than her previous works, using muted grays, whites, and blues to create smooth surfaces with little to no visible brushwork, visually similar to many minimalist artworks from the era. The shaped canvases were inspired by an experience she had in 1955, shortly after her father's death; the bedsheet from her father's deathbed was hanging to dry on a clothesline and moving in the wind, making her imagine the same shapes and textures as a painting. Her shaped canvases have been described as having "sensual contours".

She did not find much success in New York, struggling to find galleries that would accept her work for exhibition, but she stayed in the city for a decade, living in Harlem. She did, however, regularly exhibit her work in Puerto Rico during this era, including two solo exhibitions at the University of Puerto Rico in 1966 and 1970. In the late 1960s she began making works with titles referencing classical and ancient histories and myths, including Las Amazonas (The Amazons) and Troyanas (Trojan Women); these works are often named for female warriors and highlight the female form.

=== 1970s-2000s: Puerto Rico, isolation from art world ===
In 1971 Sánchez Domínguez left New York to live in Puerto Rico permanently. In the early 1970s, she became the designer for the short-lived literary journal Zona de Carga y Descarga (Zone of Loading and Unloading).

She began working at the Escuela de Artes Plásticas y Diseño de Puerto Rico in the 1990s, and eventually taught at the Art Students League of San Juan as well.

In 2000, she executed the performance piece Encuentrismo — Ofrenda o Retorno (The Encounter — Offering or Return) using one of her shaped canvases, a painting titled Soy Isla. She placed the painting in the ocean and allowed the water to overtake the work; she later exhibited the painting in front of a video of the performance.

Prior to the 2010s, she was known primarily in Puerto Rico.

=== 2010s: Artists Space, Hurricane Maria, retrospective ===
In 2013, Sánchez Domínguez staged a solo survey exhibition at the nonprofit gallery Artists Space in New York. The exhibition was broadly acclaimed in art publications and helped reintroduce her work to a broader audience in the art world. Writing in The New York Times, critic Holland Cotter called the show "one of the year's high points, a revelation and a refreshment." Following the exhibition she acquired representation from Galerie Lelong & Co., her first commercial representative in New York. Mary Sabbatino, a vice president of the gallery, flew to San Juan to meet Sánchez Domínguez within a day of seeing images of the exhibition at Artists Space to offer her representation; Sabbatino said that Sánchez Domínguez took her hands during the first meeting and told Sabbatino to "'Cuida mis obras': take care of my work."

In 2017, Sánchez Domínguez participated in the 57th Venice Biennale. The same year, her pre-war wooden studio in the Santurce neighborhood of San Juan was severely damaged by Hurricane Maria. A large amount of her archive of artwork was destroyed by water damage.

Her work was included in the group exhibition Radical Women: Latin American Art, 1960-85 at the Hammer Museum in 2017, placing her in the context of well-known Latin American artists and introducing her to another, broader audience; the show also traveled to the Brooklyn Museum. The exhibition opened at the Hammer the day after Hurricane Maria struck her studio.

With the support of several of her students and a number of community members, Sánchez Domínguez rebuilt and repaired her damaged studio, moving back into the space by 2019.

Maquinista, diptico (Machinist, diptych) (2008) at The Phillips Collection

In early 2019, The Phillips Collection in Washington, D.C., staged Sánchez Domínguez's first museum retrospective, Zilia Sánchez: Soy Isla, covering the entirety of her 70-year career. After closing at The Phillips, the exhibition traveled to the Museo de Arte de Ponce in Puerto Rico and El Museo del Barrio in New York. The retrospective was broadly acclaimed in art and news publications. (Note: The exhibition received positive reviews in The Washington Post, Washington City Paper, Hyperallergic, Art in America, frieze, The New Yorker, The Brooklyn Rail, and The New York Times.)

Also in 2019, she staged a solo exhibition at Galerie Lelong in New York. She exhibited several freestanding sculptures, her first works created with marble.

=== 2020s: International acclaim, 60th Venice Biennale ===
Sánchez Domínguez's work was included in the 2021 exhibition Women in Abstraction at the Centre Pompidou. In 2023, her work was included in the group exhibition Action, Gesture, Paint: Women Artists and Global Abstraction 1940-1970 at the Whitechapel Gallery in London.

In 2024, Sánchez Domínguez participated in the 60th Venice Biennale, her second time exhibiting at the Biennale. Her shaped canvas Lunar (1980) was included in the central exhibition's gallery of historical abstraction.

Sánchez Domínguez also opened a solo museum exhibition at the Institute of Contemporary Art, Miami in 2024, Zilia Sánchez: Topologías / Topologies, a survey of her work from the 1950s to mid-1990s. The show is scheduled to travel to the Museum of Art of Puerto Rico in March 2025.

== Death ==
Sánchez Domínguez died in San Juan on 18 December 2024, at the age of 98. Her death was announced by her art dealer, Galerie Lelong & Co, along with the Museum of Art of Puerto Rico. She was survived by her partner, Victoria Ruiz.

== Exhibitions ==
- 1957 – Exposición de pinturas: Zilia Sánchez, Galería Clan, Madrid.
- 1958 – Museo Nacional de Bellas Artes, Havana.
- 1970 – Estructuras en secuencia, Museo de Historia, Arqueología y Arte, Universidad de Puerto Rico, San Juan.
- 1991 – Zilia Sánchez: Tres décadas: Los sesenta, los setenta, los ochenta. Museo Casa Roig, Humacao, Puerto Rico.
- 2000 – Heroic/Erotic, Museo de las Américas, San Juan, Puerto Rico.
- 2013 – Artists Space, New York City.
- 2014 – Zilia Sánchez: Heróicas eróticas en Nueva York, Galerie Lelong, New York.
- 2017 – 57th International Art Exhibition – La Biennale di Venezia, VIVA ARTE VIVA.
- 2019 – Soy Isla (I Am an Island), The Phillips Collection, Washington, D.C.

== Notes, citations, and references ==
=== Cited references ===
- Sretenović, Vesela, ed. (2019). "Embodied Spaces of Zilia Sánchez". Zilia Sánchez: Soy Isla. Washington, D.C. / New Haven, Connecticut: The Phillips Collection / Yale University Press. pp. 1–15. ISBN 9780300233902. OCLC 1046461607.
- Cluck, Alyson (2019). "Chronology". In Sretenović, Vesela (ed.). Zilia Sánchez: Soy Isla. Washington, D.C. / New Haven, Connecticut: The Phillips Collection / Yale University Press. pp. 151–163. ISBN 9780300233902. OCLC 1046461607.
