= Sarah Grilo =

Argentine artist (died 2007)

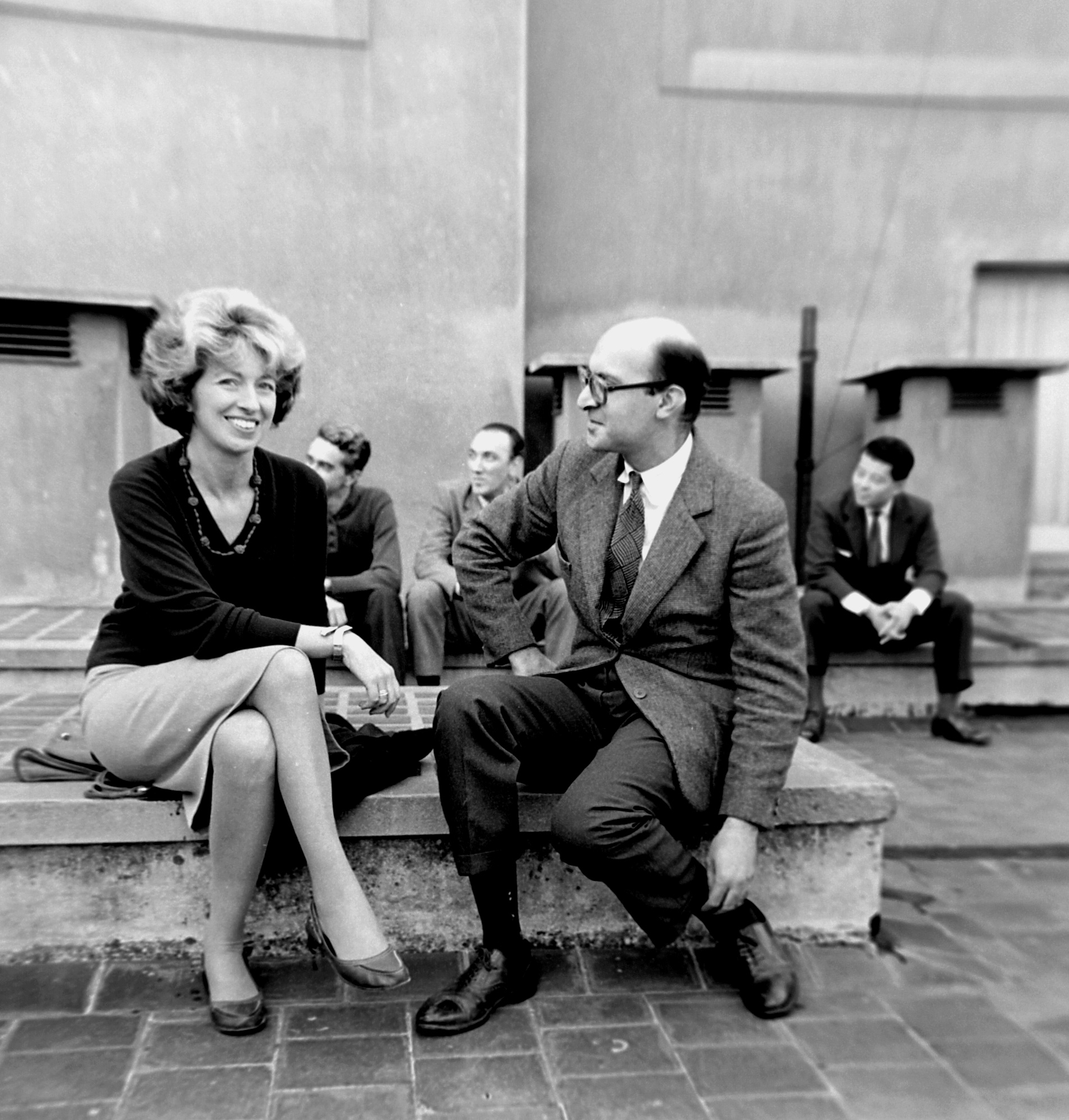
- Born: circa 1919; Buenos Aires
- Died: 2007; Madrid
- Style: Abstraction
- Awards: Guggenheim Fellowship (1961)
- Website: sarahgrilofernandezmuro.com

Sarah Grilo (circa 1919 – 2007) was an Argentine painter who is best known for her abstract gestural paintings. Married to the artist José Antonio Fernández-Muro, she lived in Buenos Aires, Paris, New York and Madrid.

She is considered one of the most important Latin American artists of the 20th century.

== Career ==
Sarah Grilo began her career as a self-taught artist. In 1944, she began studying at the studio of the Catalan artist Vicente Puig. There, she met her husband, the artist José Antonio Fernández-Muro.

In 1949, she presented her first solo exhibition in Madrid, which was characterised by being a mixture of figuration and cubism.

Around this period, her paintings became more abstract. In 1952, she joined the group Artistas Modernos de la Argentina, under the direction of Aldo Pellegrini.

The group, made up of artists such as Enio Iommi, Alfredo Hlito, Tomàs Maldonado, Lidy Prati and José Antonio Fernández-Muro, among others, was presented in exhibitions at the Stedelijk Museum in Amsterdam and at the Museum of Modern Art, Rio de Janeiro until it was dissolved in 1954.

Following the dissolution of the group, Sarah Grilo moved to Paris. During this period, between 1957 and 1961, her work became more lyrical.

In 1962, she won the Guggenheim Fellowship. The prize marked a turning point in her career and she moved to New York. From then on, she gradually freed herself from Geometric abstraction and developed a new plastic language. Her gestural works combined coloured surfaces, drips, digital and textual signs, graffiti.

In 1970, the artist left for the south of Spain, where she would stay until 1979 with her family. From 1980 she alternated her stay between Paris and Madrid, where she definitely moved to live with her husband in 1985, until her death in 2007.

Sarah Grilo has exhibited in numerous galleries and institutions in the United States, Latin America, and Europe. These include: the National Museum of Fine Arts in Buenos Aires; The Museo de Bellas Artes, Caracas; The Instituto de Arte Contemporáneo, Lima; The Solomon R. Guggenheim Museum, New York; The Cisneros Fontanals Art Foundation (CIFO), Miami; The Art Museum of the Americas, Washington D.C.; The Nelson RockefellerCollection, New York; The Blanton Museum of Art, Austin; The Stedelijk Museum Amsterdam; The Museo Español de Arte Contemporáneo, Madrid; and The Museo Nacional Centro de Arte Reina Sofía, Madrid, among others.

In 2023 her work was included in the exhibition Action, Gesture, Paint: Women Artists and Global Abstraction 1940-1970 at the Whitechapel Gallery in London.
