= Hedwig Thun =

German painter and writer

Hedwig Thun

Hedwig Thun (1892 – 1969) was a German painter and writer. She studied at the Bauhaus Dessau where her teachers included Wassily Kandinsky.

In 2022 her work was the subject of a retrospective at Kunstforum Hermann Stenner entitled Hedwig Thun-Vom Bauhaus zum Informel. Eine Wiederentdeckung (From Bauhaus to Informel. A rediscovery).

In 2023 her work was included in the exhibition Action, Gesture, Paint: Women Artists and Global Abstraction 1940-1970 at the Whitechapel Gallery in London.
