= Vivian Springford =

American painter (1913–2003)

- Born: 1913; Milwaukee, Wisconsin, US
- Died: 2003 (aged 89–90); New York, New York, US
- Education: Spence School; Arts Student League
- Known for: Painting, drawing
- Movement: Abstract Expressionism; Color Field painting

Vivian Springford (1913–2003) was an American painter and assemblage artist active in the second half of the 20th century. Springford's abstract paintings and collages are best known for their focus on using color to express captivating patterns and phenomena found in nature as well as from Chinese Calligraphy and Eastern forms of thought such as Taoism and Confucianism.

== Biography ==
Springford was born in 1913 in Milwaukee. Her family moved to Detroit in 1926, and in 1930 to New York, when Springford's father, Herbert Henry Springford, became President of Servel, Inc., a refrigerator manufacturer. She attended the Spence School with her sister, Margaret, and graduated in 1932. Shortly after in November 1932, Springford was featured as one of "Debutantes of the Winter Season in New York" in The New York Times. She continued her studies at the Arts Student League until 1946, primarily working under Jon Corbino and Robert Brackman. Under their influence, Springford began her artistic career as a commercial illustrator in the 1930s to 40s, creating portraits of actresses, debutantes, and other society women for the local New York newspapers. Throughout the 1930s and 1940s, Springford worked as a commercial illustrator and portrait artist. Her commissions included portraits of actresses and socialites for local New York newspapers and the book 1939 Juggernaut: The Path Towards Dictatorship by Albert Carr, for which Springford created illustrated images of twenty global dictators. Her commercial portraiture throughout this time was stylized though highly realistic.

By the 1950s Springford style was influenced by Abstract Expressionism and East Asian art and culture. In the 1970s she created stain paintings. Springford suffered from macular degeneration and stopped painting by the 1990s. In the late 1990s much of her work, then in a storage locker, was brought to the attention of Gary Snyder Fine Art.

Springford died in 2003.

== Exhibitions ==
Springford has been represented in several solo and group exhibitions at institutions.

Notable exhibitions were held at the National Academy of Design, New York, NY (1959); Great Jones Gallery, New York, NY (1960); Balin Traube Gallery, New York, NY (1962); Preston Gallery, New York, NY (1963); Brooklyn Museum, Brooklyn, NY (1975); WIA Foundation, New York, NY (1976); Visual Arts Coalition, New York, NY (1979); Gary Snyder Fine Arts, New York, NY (1998, 2001, 2003, 2009); Peyton Wright Gallery, Santa Fe, NM (2014, 2015); Tayloe Piggott Gallery, Jackson, WY (2017); Museum of Fine Arts, Boston, MA (2019); Almine Rech, New York, NY (2018, 2020), and Taka Ishii Gallery, Tokyo (2021) among others.

Springford debuted with a solo exhibition at Great Jones Gallery (September 26 – October 16, 1960). James R. Mellow, in an Arts Magazine review in 1960, remarked that Springford's calligraphic abstract works are "notable for a first one-man showing". Springford's successful first exhibition was also featured in William Kronick's film, A Bowl of Cherries (1961), which was played at the Museum of Modern Art on a number of occasions. Its first showcase was on October 7, 1962, as the museum's "recent acquisition", and then on August 10, 1966, as part of the museum's film program, "The Thirties: U.S.A."

Springford had a period of inactivity in the 1980s until the late 1990s due to declining health. In 1998, eighteen years after her last exhibition, art dealer Gary Snyder organized the first retrospective exhibition of Springford, titled Vivian Springford: Abstract Paintings 1956-1988. The show generated great attention from the public and collectors alike, and was nearly sold out before the opening.

In 2003, the year of Springford's death, her early works from the 1960s were again featured in a solo exhibition at Gary Snyder Fine Arts, West Meets East: A Memorial Exhibition of Painting on Canvas and Rice Paper by Vivian Springford (September 12 — October 25, 2003). Reviewing the exhibition for The New York Times, Grace Glueck praised the "strong sense of color" and "exuberant linear scribblings and doodlings".

Springford was a leading member of the Women in the Arts Foundation (WIA), through which she has had several exhibitions, including Works on Paper: Women Artists at the Brooklyn Museum in 1975 and a solo exhibition at WIA Foundation, New York, NY in 1976. Other museum exhibitions that included Springford's works are Denver Art Museum's Women of Abstract Expressionism (June 12, 2016 – September 25, 2016) and Museum of Fine Arts, Boston's Contemporary Art: Five Propositions (October 26, 2019 – May 4, 2020).

In 2018, Roberta Smith, The New York Times co-chief art critic, selected exhibitions in New York that she believed provided "a new visibility" to painting's present and recent past. One of the seven selections was the solo exhibition of Vivian Springford at Almine Rech, New York, NY (September 12 - October 20, 2018): "Most of the paintings here feature concentric poolings of translucent colors that intimate flowers, clouds and water reflections. They build on the potential of Georgia O'Keeffe's early watercolors — as O'Keeffe did not — but also evoke the art critic Robert Hughes's epithet about the Color Field paintings being "giant watercolors".

The exhibition at Almine Rech was also selected as one of the five "Season Openers" by Whitewall Magazine along with "New Work: Etel Adnan" at SFMOMA and "Sarah Lucas: Au Naturel" at the New Museum.

In June 2021, Springford's had her first solo exhibition in Asia at Taka Ishii Gallery in Tokyo. Exhibited were works from Springford's Star Stuff and Expansionist series which have not been exhibited publicly since 1979.

In 2023 her work was included in the exhibition Action, Gesture, Paint: Women Artists and Global Abstraction 1940-1970 at the Whitechapel Gallery in London.

== Publications ==
- Marter, Joan, et al. Women of abstract expressionism. Denver, CO; New Haven, CT: Denver Art Museum in association with Yale University Press, 2016. ISBN 9780300208429
- Schwartz, Alexandra and Shechet, Arlene. Vivian Springford. Brussels, Belgium: Almine Rech Gallery Editions, 2018. ISBN 9782930573281
- Peyton Wright Gallery. Vivian Springford.
- Review. New York, NY: The Village Voice, 1963.
- Review. New York, NY: The Villager (Greenwich Village, NY), 1960.
- Review. New York, NY: Arts Magazine, 1960.
