= Noemí Di Benedetto =

Argentine artist (1930–2010)

- Born: 1930; Buenos Aires, Argentina
- Died: 2010 (aged 79–80); Buenos Aires, Argentina
- Occupation: Visual Artist
- Style: Painting and Sculpture

Noemí Di Benedetto (1930–2010) was an Argentine painter and visual artist with a long career. She formed part of the Informalism group in Argentina.

== Career ==
Di Benedetto studied at the Manuel Belgrano and Prilidiano Pueyrredón National Schools of Fine Arts. She began to exhibit in 1959 with works linked to geometric abstraction, but shortly after her work moved towards Informalism.

In 1959, she was selected to participate with the Argentine contingent at the 1ª Bienal de Jóvenes de París (1st Paris Youth Biennial). Di Benedetto had a solo exhibition in 1961 at the Galería Peuser and at Galería Lirolay, and then the following year she exhibited again at the Galería Peuser. In 1960, she participated in the Primera Exposición Internacional de Arte Moderno (First International Exhibition of Modern Art), at the Buenos Aires Museum of Modern Art. And, between 1960 and 1964 she worked with burlap, cloth, wood, and scrap cardboard in her pieces; crude and ephemeral materials that she subjected to all kinds of torture, tears, burns, blows and stains. In her Cajas Visuales, she created wooden constructions and mirrors to multiply forms and obtain a fourth dimension of spatial suggestions.

In 1961, she took part in the exhibition Cinco expresiones de la plástica actual, at the Galería Lirolay, participated in the Premio Ver y Estimar, at the Museo Nacional de Bellas Artes and participated in the Arte Argentino Contemporáneo exhibition at the Río de Janeiro Museum of Modern Art. During that same year, she was also part of the La mujer en la Pintura Argentina exhibition at the Galería Forum, in Buenos Aires, exhibiting with Marta Minujín, Martha Peluffo and Lea Lublin

In 1962, Di Benedetto was invited to the Collages exhibition at the Galería Lirolay, and she also exhibited her work at the Premio Ver y Estimar, at the Museo Nacional de Bellas Artes and in the exhibition El hombre antes del hombre, organized by the Buenos Aires Museum of Modern Art.

In 1963, she was awarded a fellowship with Argentine National Endowment for the Arts.

In 1964, Di Benedetto worked on a series of objects built from defunct drawers, which looked like the remains of an unknown disaster. The objects were almost completely consumed by fire, appearing as tragic and convulsed containers.

In 1980, she returned to painting. Di Benedetto died in 2010 in Buenos Aires.

Works by Di Benedetto are in the collection of the Buenos Aires Museum of Modern Art. and the Museo Nacional de Bellas Artes.

In 2023 her work was included in the exhibition Action, Gesture, Paint: Women Artists and Global Abstraction 1940-1970 at the Whitechapel Gallery in London.

== Artworks ==
- 2000: Visualidad alternada.
- 1993: Las letras del paisaje.
- 1990: Pintura sin título.
- 1985: Figura (oil on canvas).
- 1984: El rostro del hombre contemporáneo (El hombre sin rostro).
- 1961: Pintura sin título (oil and burlap on cardboard).
- 1961: Collage rojo.

== Publications ==
Di Benedetto, Noemi; Brossa, Joan (1996). La obra plástica de Noemi Di Benedetto (in Spanish). Buenos Aires: Besteiro Talleres Graficos. OCLC 36758594.
