= Dusti Bongé =

American painter

- Born: Eunice Lyle Swetman; 1903; Biloxi, Mississippi, US
- Died: 1993 (aged 89–90)
- Known for: Painting
- Movement: Abstract Expressionism

Dusti Bongé (née Eunice Lyle Swetman, 1903–1993) was an American painter who worked from the 1930s through the early 1990s. She is considered Mississippi's first Abstract Expressionist painter and its first Modernist artist.

== Early life and education ==
Dusti Bongé, née Eunice Lyle Swetman, was the youngest of three children born to a prominent Biloxi, Mississippi, banking family. When she was young, Bongé was attracted to the arts and wrote, produced, directed and acted in plays starring other neighborhood children on the wide gallery of the family's beachfront home. Her interest in theater continued into adulthood. Because her passion for acting was frowned upon by her family, she struck a deal that if she first completed college she would be allowed to go to a drama school. She graduated high school at the age of sixteen and completed her four year college curriculum in two years. She graduated from Blue Mountain College in northeastern Mississippi, going on to Lyceum Arts Conservatory in Chicago, where she studied acting and played bit parts on the stage. It was then she received her nickname, Dusti, from friends because they teased her about constantly washing her dusty face when she would return home through the bustling, dirty streets of the growing city. With spelling adjusted, the nickname stuck. While in Chicago, Bongé met and fell in love with Arch Bongé, a Nebraska “cowboy artist,” who was taking classes at the Art Institute of Chicago. They married in 1928. In 1924, she moved to New York.

== Career ==
Bongé started her career when she moved to New York in 1924 where she acted on the stage and in films. Bongé decided to give up her acting career when she discovered she was pregnant with her son Lyle Bongé.

Bongé moved back to her home town of Biloxi in 1934 after she and Arch decided they did not want to raise Lyle in New York. Bongé began to explore painting after leaving acting to start a family.

=== Early work ===
Bongé showed promise as a painter and Arch encouraged her to work with him. After Arch's death from Lou Gehrig's disease in 1936, Bongé sought solace in the studio where they had worked together and began to paint seriously. Bongé's early work depicted scenes of Biloxi, partly inspired by Archie’s renderings of the waterfront and cityscape. Bongé also produced a series of still life compositions as well as a variety of self portraits. Her early work was representational but showed her ability to move from a realist to a much more modernist style.

=== Surrealism ===
In 1938, she began to experiment with Surrealism and worked in that style of over a decade. “As time passed,” she recalled, “I became more comfortable with my work and my pictures became more and more abstract.” Initially Bongé exhibited her work in Biloxi and New Orleans. Bongé exhibited her work at the Contemporary arts Gallery in New York City in 1939. This was her first exhibition in New York. The Betty Parsons Gallery opened in New York in 1946, and Dusti forged a relationship with the Abstract Expressionist dealer who would represent her for many years. Bongé created a series of works now referred to as the Circus series. The circus offered very rich subject matters for her to experiment with in her work, whether in color, composition, or content. In the early 1950s, her Surrealist style developed further as she began her depictions of “keyhole people.”

=== Abstract Expressionism ===
The years 1953-1956 mark a transitional period in her work as she moves fully into Abstract Expressionism, the style in which she seemed to find her greatest satisfaction. Some of the work from this period features angular forms and paint surfaces that are etched and textured. Betty Parsons gave her her first solo exhibition in April 1956.

Bongé continued to work in a similar abstract style in the 1960s, but with a darker palette. As a New York Herald Tribune critic noted in 1960: “Dusti Bongé, artist of the deep south, appears at the Betty Parsons Gallery with forceful and determinedly non-objective paintings. Having her third show here, Miss Bongé is perhaps more dramatic at this moment than she has ever been. Her canvases are extremely vigorous, dark-keyed and spacious.” Her final show at the Parsons gallery was in 1975, but she continued to create a very strong body of work, including some monumental oil paintings, through the next decade.

=== Later Work ===
In the 1980s Bongé continued to make a body of abstract work. Her work from this period explores conceptual themes such as the transcendent Buddhist concept of the "Void" During this period of exploring conceptual themes she painted her "Void" series. This series focused on circle shapes in abstract form and illustrated emptiness.

During the late 1980s and early 1990s, small format watercolor paintings many on Joss paper (sheets of bamboo or rice paper centered with a small square of gold or silver leaf) that was available at the local Asian markets and was traditionally used in Buddhist ceremonies. This became her preferred medium. “It became a special challenge,” she said, “to make it seem as if I had placed that little square right there.” She painted her last work in 1991.

== Personal life ==
Dusti met her husband while they both were going to school in Chicago. Arch was working a doorman and opened a door for Dusti. They were married in 1928.

Dusti and Arch Bongé's only child, Lyle Bongé, was born November 5, 1929. Lyle was drawn to art from spending time with his mother in her studio, inspiring him to pursue photography.

While Bongé enjoyed success by being a part of the New York art scene she preferred to paint in her home town of Biloxi where she raised her son and continued to have success in her career.

Although in later years, she had an active social life, dated and had numerous proposals, Dusti never remarried.

== Exhibitions ==
Bongé's first exhibition was in the Contemporary arts Gallery in New York in 1939.

Bongé continued to show in New York at Betty Parsons Gallery beginning in the mid 1940s, She had her first solo exhibition at Betty Parsons Gallery in 1956. Bongé continued to show at Betty Parson's until 1976. Bongé had solo exhibitions at Betty Parson's in 1958, 1960, and 1962. She had her final exhibition at Betty Parsons Gallery in 1975.

The Ogden Museum of Southern Art held an exhibition of Bongé's work in 2019 called "Piercing the Inner Wall: The Art of Dusti Bongé." The exhibition followed the release of “Dusti Bongé, Art and Life: Biloxi, New Orleans & New York,”

Bongé's work has been exhibited at the Ogden Museum of Southern Art in New Orleans; the Walter Anderson Museum of Art in Ocean Springs, Mississippi; the Ohr-O’Keefe Museum of Art in Biloxi; the Mississippi Museum of Art; and the Mobile Museum of Art. Her work is in the permanent collections of the Mississippi Museum of Art; the Ogden Museum of Southern Art; the Mobile Museum of Art; the National Museum of Women in the Arts; and the Johnson Collection in Spartanburg, South Carolina, as well as a number of private collections throughout the United States.

In 2023 her work was included in the exhibition Action, Gesture, Paint: Women Artists and Global Abstraction 1940-1970 at the Whitechapel Gallery in London.

== Museum collections ==
- Heckscher Museum of Art, Huntington, NY
- The Johnson Collection, Spartanburg, SC
- Lauren Rogers Museum of Art, Laurel, MS
- Mississippi Museum of Art, Jackson, MS
- Mobile Museum of Art, Mobile, AL
- Morris Museum of Art, Augusta, GA
- Museum of Art and Archaeology, University of Missouri, Columbia, MO
- Museum of Modern Art, New York, NY
- Ogden Museum of Southern Art, New Orleans, LA
- University of Southern Mississippi Art Museum, Hattiesburg, MS
- Walter Anderson Museum of Art, Ocean Springs, MS
