= Rolando Gonzalez-Bunster =

US-based Argentine businessman (born c. 1947)

- Born: c. 1947; Argentina
- Education: Georgetown University
- Occupation: Businessman
- Board member of: Clinton Foundation
- Children: 5
- Relatives: Stefano Bonfiglio (son-in-law)

Rolando Gonzalez-Bunster (born c. 1947) is a US-based Argentine businessman. He is the founder, chairman and chief executive officer of InterEnergy Group, a UK-based energy company active in the Dominican Republic, Panama, Chile, Jamaica and Uruguay. A college friend of former President Bill Clinton, he is a director of the Clinton Foundation.

== Early life ==
Gonzalez-Bunster was born circa 1947 in Argentina. He graduated from Georgetown University in Washington, D.C., in 1968. While he was in college, he was friends with Bill Clinton.

== Career ==
Gonzalez-Bunster built a barge-mounted power plant with the Seaboard Corporation in the 1980s.

Gonzalez-Bunster served as the vice president of Gulf and Western Industries. He founded Basic Energy Ltd. (Bahamas), an operator and distributor of energy in the Dominican Republic, Panama and Jamaica. He also served as the president of the Board of Directors of Empresa Generadora de Electricidad Haina, a coal, oil and wind energy company active in the Dominican Republic. Additionally, he was a partner in Remington Realty, a Texas-based real estate company, and an investor in AquaCube, a Scottish water purification company.

Gonzalez-Bunster founded InterEnergy Group, a UK-based energy company active in the Dominican Republic, Panama, Chile, Jamaica and Uruguay, in 2011. He serves as its chairman and CEO. Gonzalez-Bunster also serves as the president and director of Consorcio Energetico Punta Cana Macao (CEPM), a wind and solar energy producer which distributes electricity in the Dominican towns of Punta Cana, Bávaro and Bayahibe.

== Philanthropy and political contributions ==
Gonzalez-Bunster is a member of the Institute of the Americas. He serves on the board of directors of the Latin American Board of his alma mater, Georgetown University. In 2013, he organized the launch of the Georgetown Alumni Club in the Dominican Republic.

Gonzalez-Bunster visited Haiti alongside his daughter, as well as Dr Paul Farmer and Bill Clinton shortly after the 2010 earthquake. has served on the board of directors of the Clinton Foundation since 2013.

Gonzalez-Bunster donated $30,000 to Virginia Governor Terry McAuliffe in 2009 and 2013. He donated US$100,000 to the Hillary Victory Fund, a SuperPAC which supports Hillary Clinton's 2016 presidential campaign.

== Personal life ==
Gonzalez-Bunster resides in Greenwich, Connecticut, with another property, Casa Pacifica, in Casa de Campo, La Romana, the Dominican Republic. He has five children, including a son, Luis, who is paraplegic; Diego, Matías and two daughters, Adriana and Carolina. His daughter Carolina Gonzalez-Bunster, a former Goldman Sachs banker and the founder of the Walkabout Foundation, is married to Stefano Bonfiglio, the co-founder of private equity firm Stirling Square Capital Partners, and they live in Knightsbridge, London. Her wedding was attended by Hillary and Bill Clinton.
