= Finnmark, Winter =

1966 painting by Anna-Eva Bergman

- Finnmark, winter (Norwegian), Hiver horizon du Nord (French)
- Artist: Anna-Eva Bergman
- Year: 1966
- Type: metal foil on canvas
- Dimensions: 150 cm × 300 cm (59 in × 120 in)
- Location: Fondation Hartung-Bergman; Antibes, France

Finnmark, Winter (Norwegian: Finnmark, winter) is a painting by Norwegian artist Anna-Eva Bergman in 1966. The picture was made with metal foil on canvas and has dimensions of 150 x 300 cm.

The picture is part of the collection of the Fondation Hartung-Bergman in Antibes, France.

== Background ==
Although Anna-Eva Bergman was Norwegian, she did most of her work in France, where she participated in numerous exhibitions until her death in 1987. Her principles in art grew from the line drawings she drew for books by herself and others. In her last forty years of production she opted for abstract paintings inspired by nature. Looking for new techniques, she used aluminum, silver and gold foil in her work.

Beginning in the 1950s, after a visit to the north of Norway, she began to paint its landscapes.

Finnmark was created with aluminum foil applied to the fabric; a technique that gives a special light to this painting. It represents an arctic landscape in Finnmark, Norway near the border with Russia in Murmansk. A strong contrast is expressed with light and dark areas in horizontal lines, representing the snow objects in the dark northern winter, the relationship between light and shadow in the landscape, creating a perspective effect that allows the viewer to look beyond the tundra of Finnmark.
