= Villa Paula (Miami) =

Historic Building in Miami, Florida

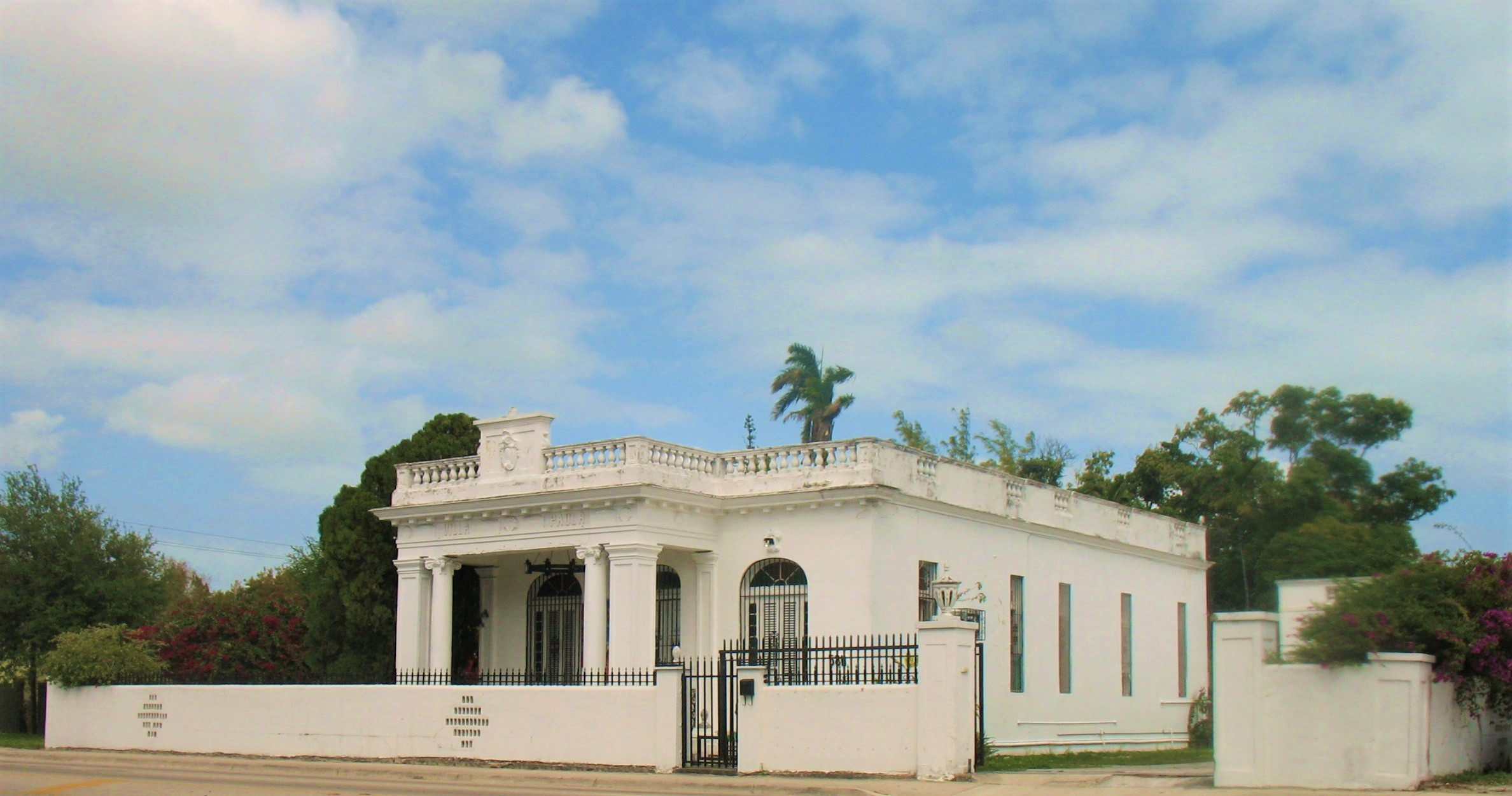
- Villa Paula seen from across North Miami Ave. in 2008
- Interactive map of the Villa Paula area

General information
- Architectural style: Neoclassical
- Location: 5811 North Miami Ave, 33127, Miami, Florida, U.S.A.
- Coordinates: 25°49′44.544″N 80°11′45.42″W
- Completed: 1926

Design and construction
- Architect: Cayetano Freira

Villa Paula is an historic building located in the Little Haiti neighborhood of Miami, Florida. It was designed by Havana architect Cayetano Freira and built in 1926 by the Cuban government as a consulate and residence for its consul, Domingo Milord and his wife Paula Milord, for whom he named the home. Paula's name still appears in plaster above the home's entrance.

The style of Villa Paula was conceived by the Cuban government to send a message "about the cosmopolitan civilization enjoyed by Cuba in contrast to the relatively provincial tastes of Miami" at the time. To that end, all of the home's building materials and workers were imported from Cuba.

By 1930, political upheavals in Cuba, and a resulting economic depression, led to the consulate's closure. Domingo and Paula moved out of Villa Paula in 1930 and the building ceased to serve in any official capacity for the Cuban government. Paula died two years later at the age of 61. A widely-reported claim that she was buried in the home’s garden was debunked in a 2019 Miami New Times investigation.

After the Milords left the home in 1930, it was purchased by Helen Reardon, a wealthy widow from Wisconsin. Reardon lived at Villa Paula until her death in 1970. Villa Paula changed hands several times after 1970 and briefly operated as a senior citizens' residence. By the mid-70's, as the surrounding neighborhood grew blighted, Villa Paula was left vacant and fell into disrepair. Later that decade, it was purchased by Clif Ensor, who restored the home to its original condition and who, also, began telling Miami media outlets that the home was haunted. His claims of paranormal experiences at the home led to widespread media coverage of Villa Paula, which has persisted until today.

In 1983, the city of Miami designated the structure historic. In 1987, that designation was amended to include the interior and an adjacent lot. Ensor sold the home to Haitian pediatrician Lucien Albert in 1987. Albert then sold Villa Paula to its current owners in 2003.

Despite several modern references to Villa Paula as Miami’s “first Cuban consulate,” it was, in fact, the city's second. The first Cuban consulate, as reported by the Miami News at the time, opened on April 10, 1909 in the now-demolished Watson Building on 13th Street and Avenue D (later renamed Miami Avenue).

Villa Paula came to represent the depth of the Cuban community's roots in South Florida. It would, however, more often make headlines due to Ensor's and later residents' paranormal claims.

Villa Paula now serves as a private art gallery since August 2015.
