= Ruth Armer =

American painter

- Born: May 26, 1896; San Francisco, California
- Died: August 29, 1977 (aged 81); San Francisco, California
- Occupations: Artist, collector
- Spouse: Joseph Bransten

Ruth Armer (May 26, 1896 – August 29, 1977) was an American abstractionist painter, teacher, art collector, and lithographer, from the San Francisco Bay area in California. Her art is held in the collections of San Francisco Museum of Modern Art, and the Fine Arts Museums of San Francisco.

== Early life and education ==
Armer was born on May 26, 1896, in San Francisco, California. She attended the California School of Fine Arts and the School of Fine and Applied Art in New York. While in New York, she studied at the Art Students League with influential American artists such as George Bellows, Robert Henri, Kenneth Hayes Miller, and John Sloan.

== Career ==
Armer was regarded as "one of San Francisco's more profound abstractionists." She had solo exhibitions at the Cleveland Museum of Art, and at the San Francisco Museum of Art in 1936 and 1939, and in the Quay Gallery in San Francisco in 1972 and 1975.

She painted landscapes, portraits, and abstract works, and was also a lithographer. Her art was influenced by her experience living in California, and her subject matter included the California desert and the cityscapes of San Francisco. Armer studied under George Bellows, Robert Henri, Kenneth Miller and John Sloan at the School of Fine and Applied Art in New York. She taught drawing, painting and other subjects at the California School of Fine Arts, today known as the San Francisco Art Institute, from 1933 to 1940. During her career, she also worked at the Oakland Museum, and later served on the Board of Directors. After retiring from teaching, she devoted her time to painting in her studio on Russian Hill, in San Francisco.

=== Artistic vision ===
Armer began her career painting landscapes, with an emphasis on portraying connections between objects rather than a literal likeness. Her later work was influenced by her exposure to classical music during a convalescence. She sought to re-create the emotion and form of music using the medium of line and color. In an interview, she explained, "What I paint is really an emotion, and I am most interested in the emotional response...What I want to create is a milieu wherein one can flow with bits and pieces of a luminous universe."

== Personal life ==
She was married to Joseph M. Bransten, a wealthy businessman and art collector from San Francisco. Bransten outlived his wife, and died in 1980, at the age of 79.

== Death and legacy ==
Ruth Armer died in San Francisco in 1977. Her papers have been preserved in the Smithsonian Institution Archives.

In 2016 her biography was included in the exhibition catalogue Women of Abstract Expressionism organized by the Denver Art Museum. In 2023 her work was included in the exhibition Action, Gesture, Paint: Women Artists and Global Abstraction 1940-1970 at the Whitechapel Gallery in London.

== See also ==
- Abstract expressionism
