= Thu Van Tran =

Thu Van Tran (born in Ho Chi Minh City, Vietnam, 1979) is an artist. She lives and works in Paris, France.

== Works ==
Tran's work has been characterised by literature, architecture and history. Her birth country, Vietnam and her homeland France bring her to think and work with duality, inequality and instability as structural elements of her practice. Her work takes form of semantic or sculptural compositions that are placed in contemplative and discursive fields.

Tran has had solo exhibitions at Neuer Berliner Kunstverein and the Macleay Museum in Sydney.
