= Michael Kagan (artist) =

American artist (born 1980)

Michael Kagan (born 1980) is an American artist based in Brooklyn, New York City.

== Early life and education ==
Michael Kagan was born in 1980 in Virginia Beach. He grew up near the first NASA field center, which later inspired some of his work.

He received his BA from The George Washington University and Master of Fine Arts from New York Academy of Art. In 2005 he completed a postgraduate fellowship at the Academy.

== Career ==
Kagan has exhibited worldwide in group and solo exhibitions, including an upcoming exhibition at Almine Rech in London (2022); Bill Brady Gallery, Miami, FL, USA (2018); and a recent solo exhibition at Virginia Museum of Contemporary Art, Virginia Beach, VA, USA (2019/2020).

Kagan's work is several private collections, including the Hall Art Foundation, Reading, Vermont, and the Maki Collection in Tokyo, Japan.

Special projects include a painting commission from The Smithsonian; an apparel collaboration with Pharrell Williams and the Billionaire Boys Club; and album cover artwork for the White Lies album Big TV, which won an Art Vinyl award for Best Art Vinyl, 2013.

I Was There When It Happened, a book of his paintings of NASA astronauts and rockets, was published in 2019.
