= Britta Ringvall =

Swedish artist

Britta Ringvall (1912 – 1987) was a Swedish Abstract Expressionist painter. She was born and died in Stockholm. Her work is in the collection of the Moderna Museet. In 2023 her work was included in the exhibition Action, Gesture, Paint: Women Artists and Global Abstraction 1940-1970 at the Whitechapel Gallery in London.
