= Ryan Schneider =

American football player (born c.1982)

Profile
- Position: Quarterback

Personal information
- Born: c. 1982

Career information
- High school: Plantation (FL)
- College: UCF (2000–2003)

Ryan Schneider (born c 1982) is a former American football quarterback.

== Career ==
Schneider played high school football at Plantation High School in Plantation, Florida. He passed for 3,318 yards and 48 touchdowns as a senior.

Schneider played college football for the UCF Knights from 2000 to 2003. In 2002, he ranked among the leading quarterbacks in major-college football with 3,770 passing yards (7th), a 61.9% completion percentage (7th), 31 passing touchdowns (3rd), a 152.6 passing efficiency rating (4th), 8.8 passing yards per attempt (2nd), and 314.2 yards gained per game played (5th). In four years at UCF, he completed 840 of 1,354 passes (62.0%) for 10,976 yards, 82 touchdowns, 51 interceptions, and a 142.6 passer rating.

Schneider was suspended on November 3, 2003, resulting in his missing the team's final three games. He concluded his college career less than 500 yards short of Daunte Culpepper's UCF career record for passing yards and two touchdown passes short of Culpepper's career touchdown record.

== See also ==
- UCF Knights football statistical leaders
