= Brent Wadden =

Canadian artist

- Born: 1979 (age 46–47); Nova Scotia, Canada
- Education: NSCAD University
- Known for: Painter

Brent Wadden (born 1979, Nova Scotia, Canada) is a painter whose practice centers on fiber, specifically wool and yarn. His work has been compared to that of Sheila Hicks, Anni Albers, and Clyfford Still.

== Life and work ==
Wadden completed his B.F.A. at Nova Scotia College of Art and Design in 2003, where he studied under the late conceptualist painter Gerald Ferguson.

Known for making abstract geometric weavings with unpredictable graphic lines that reject any predetermined systems, he hopes that they "create some amount of confusion in the viewer which would lead to a fascination with the process." Originally focusing his practice on colorful, tessellated paintings and drawings, in 2010, Wadden began working on a weaving loom. Influenced by the quilts of Gee's Bend, the artist has explained that he avoids thinking "about the boundaries and limitations of what art is or isn't," and often sources his materials, pre-used or second-hand, from Craigslist, eBay, and Kijiji. Imperfect angles, intentionally mismatched panels, varying fibers, and pilled fabric all point to the hand rather than machine labor in the works—he expands on this, commenting: "My work is about patterning, and rhythm, and always making a mistake at some point throughout it." This DIY aesthetic is also reflected in the fact that Wadden has never had formal training with textiles or on the loom. His woven paintings also draw on the histories of Abstract Expressionism, Minimalism, First Nation and Bauhaus textiles, folk art, and indigenous traditions of art-making (particularly those of his native Nova Scotia), as well as reference current political issues, such as his Keystone XL rag rug.

The artist's first solo museum exhibition took place in 2018 at Contemporary Art Gallery, Vancouver. His work has also been exhibited at Columbus College of Art and Design, the Rubell Family Collection, Saatchi Gallery, Peres Projects, and the Art Gallery of Alberta, Canada.

== Publications ==
- "Brent Wadden: About Time," Berlin: Peres Projects, 2015, ISBN 9783000508226
