= Kathryn Andrews =

American artist

Kathryn Andrews is an American interdisciplinary conceptual artist who works with sculpture, large-scale printmaking, performance, and sound. Andrews’ work explores how seeing and sensemaking are political acts shaped by the seer's position within economic, sociocultural, and linguistic systems, often unbeknownst to them. Andrews founded the non-profit organization, The Judith Center, in February 2024.

== Early life ==
Andrews was born in Mobile, Alabama in 1973. She graduated with a BA from Duke University in 1995 and received her MFA from ArtCenter College of Design, Pasadena, in 2003.

== Exhibitions and collections ==
Andrews has shown her work internationally in major museums and galleries. During 2015-2016 her show 'Run for President' at the Museum of Contemporary Art Chicago and the Nasher Sculpture Center centered on artistic responses to presidential campaigns. Her work is in the permanent collections of, among others, the Museum of Contemporary Art, Los Angeles, Walker Art Center, Minneapolis, Museum Ludwig, Cologne, and was held in the de la Cruz Collection before it closed in 2024.

== The Judith Center ==
In February 2024, Andrews launched The Judith Center, which is an organization focused on projects related to gender, race and sexual identity. Its inaugural initiative is the Judith Center Poster Project that will commission posters from contemporary artists with a connection to the United States.

== Palisades Fire response ==
Andrews lost her Los Angeles home in January 2025 in the Palisades Fire. She lived in Pacific Palisades' historic Tahitian Terrace neighborhood. In the immediate aftermath of the fire, Andrews created an online list of artists and art workers who also lost their homes. She then helped to create "Grief and Hope," a GoFundMe to raise money to support artists affected by the wildfires. Andrews launched the initiative with gallery director Ariel Pittman, former David Kordansky Gallery director Julia V. Hendrickson, and artists Andrea Bowers and Olivia Gauthier. When asked to comment on the role of art in the rebuilding of Los Angeles, Andrews commented to Frieze magazine: "Art will connect us as it always has. Its ongoing presence will draw us together to heal in this moment of great fracturing...Grief + Hope...is what real change looks like: it’s not waiting on bigger entities to save us. It’s everybody jumping in and making a difference in this moment. It’s working and it’s incredible to see."
