= Nate Lowman =

American painter

Nate Lowman (born 1979 in Las Vegas Valley) is an American artist working in the genre of pop art.

He grew up in Idyllwild, California, where he graduated from Idyllwild Arts Academy. He received his Bachelor of Science degree from New York University in 2001.

The first solo exhibition of his work in New York City was held in 2009 at the Maccarone Gallery. Lowman had a solo exhibition at the gallery Salon 94 from November 7, 2010, until January 12, 2011. Lowman has also collaborated with the fashion brand Supreme.
