= Frohawk Two Feathers =

American artist (born 1976)

Frohawk Two Feathers (born 1976) is an American artist who currently lives and works in Los Angeles, California. His paintings often include aspects of history, storytelling and/or political commentary.

== Early life and education ==
Two Feathers was born in 1976 in Chicago, Illinois, as Umar Rashid. He attended Southern Illinois University in 2000, graduating with a Bachelor of Arts.

== Career ==
Two Feathers' work has been added to the permanent collections of the Brooklyn Museum, Santa Barbara Museum of Art, and the 21C Museum. He also has held solo exhibitions and has pieces in the collections of the Wellin Museum of Art in Clinton, New Jersey, and the Nevada Museum of Art.

His art has been reviewed in Art in America, The Los Angeles Times, and The New York Times He displays his work regularly at the Morgan Lehman Gallery in New York City.

Two Feathers also had solo exhibitions at the Visual Arts Center of New Jersey in Summit, and the Museum of Contemporary Art in Denver, Colorado. He has participated in Group shows at the Santa Barbara Museum of Art, the San Diego Museum of Art's Street Jam and Burlington City Arts in Vermont.

In 2003, Umar Rashid painted Desert People. Desert Power. In this painting, Rashid focuses on the perspectives of the people of color. Rashid made it his mission to put the omitted history of the people of color back into the history books. Rashid is so passionate about fulfilling his mission and conveying his narrative that he “turns colonial histories upside down in paintings at VPAM”. Rashid says that his narrative is also conveyed through the hip hop culture of his youth, various pop cultures, and prison cultures. Rashid has created a movement in which to correct the history books in order to shed light on colored people and what they have done for the betterment of this world.

In Fall 2014, Frohawk exhibited at the Wadsworth Atheneum Museum of Art in Hartford, Connecticut as a MATRIX artist. In 2015, his work has been displayed along with that of Duke Riley at the Cincinnati Contemporary Arts Center.

Frohawk also raps under the name of Hi-Fidel and Kent Cyclone.

Two Feathers has created a book titled The Edge of the Earth Isn't Far from Here.

== Selected works ==
=== Isabel, Queen of Harlem ===
Isabel, Queen of Harlem was made in 2017 using coffee and tea stained paper mounted onto a 30 x 22 inch canvas and ink. Frohawk Two Feathers uses his artistic ability to bring together 18th and 19th century colonial portraiture and contemporary urban culture. This piece was part of the Messier Objects, You Get the Gods You Deserve Part 3 of The Americas 1795 art exhibit. The oval frame made of coffee and tea surrounding Isabel makes her the focus of the piece. The thin lines of ink that make up Isabel, from a distance, appear as though they were just light brush strokes, but up close it is as though the individual lines piece her together. The line running down her headdress guides you down her face and down the shirt she is wearing. The piece is monochromatic and instead uses closer together lines to indicate shadows and farther apart lines to indicate lighter regions. He creates texture much the same way. The coat has curved, spaced apart lines that give the appearance of animal fur. It has a flat surface and the texture of this piece is implied.
