= David Wolkowsky =

American businessman

David William Wolkowsky
- Born: David William Wolkowsky; August 25, 1919; Key West, U.S.
- Died: September 23, 2018 (aged 99); Key West, U.S.
- Education: University of Pennsylvania (1943)
- Occupation: Real estate developer
- Relatives: Ruth W. Greenfield, sister Timothy Greenfield-Sanders, nephew

David William Wolkowsky (August 25, 1919 – September 23, 2018) was a real estate developer from Key West, Florida. He is credited with transforming the city from a navy town to a tourist destination.

== Biography ==
=== Early life and family ===
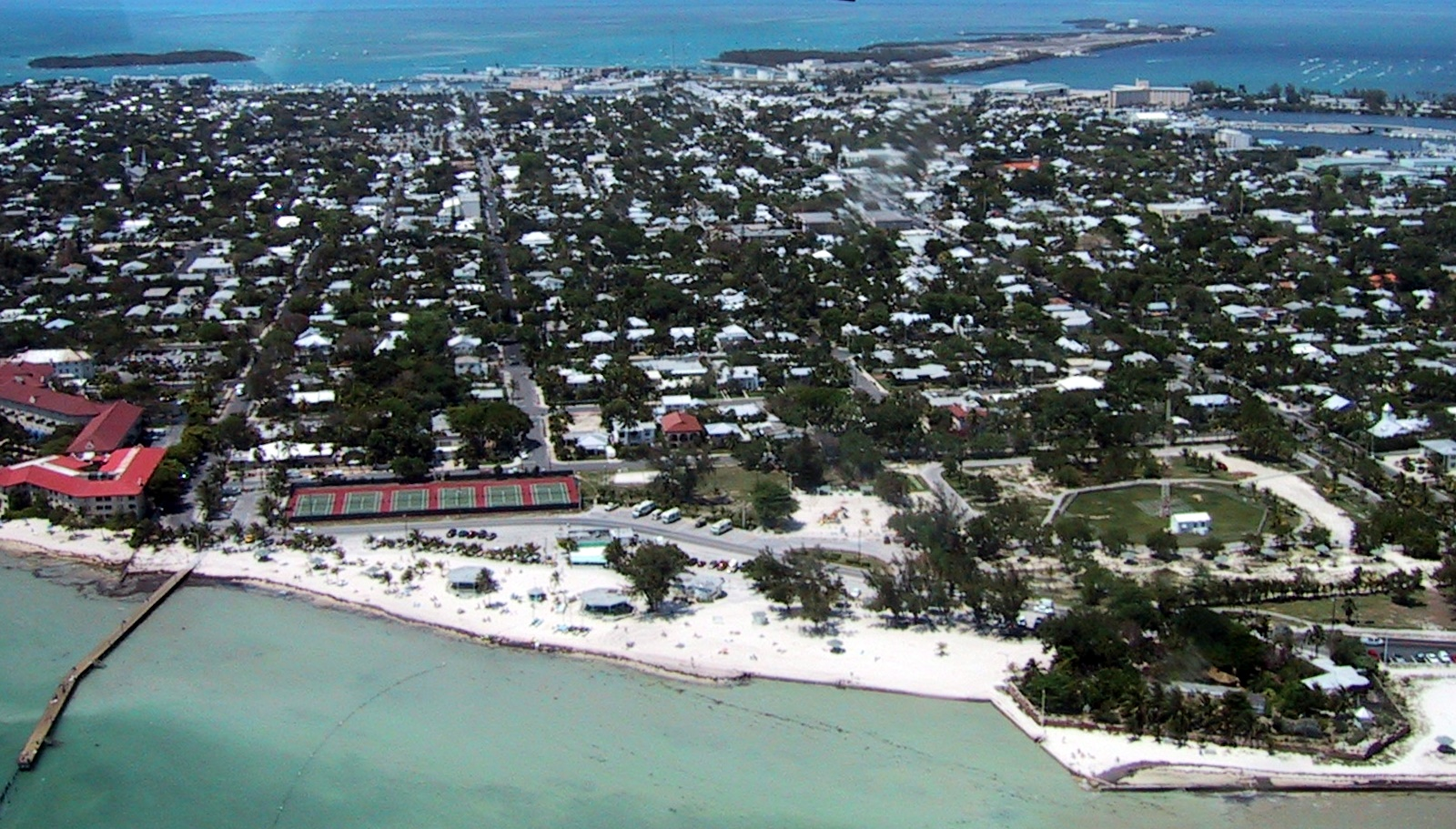
Key West

David Wolkowsky's grandfather, Abraham Wolkowsky, was a Russian Jewish immigrant who moved to Key West in 1886, where he initially worked as a peddler and eventually operated businesses including clothing stores, furniture stores, and saloons. He had two sisters: Edna Wolkowsky (died 2006) and Ruth W. Greenfield (1923-2023), a musician and social activist in Miami. Timothy Greenfield-Sanders, a photographer and filmmaker, is his nephew. He has another nephew, Miami based attorney Joseph Lipsky, and a niece, Kim Lipsky, a congressional staffer.

Wolkowsky grew up in Key West and Miami. Originally studying pre-med at the University of Pennsylvania, he decided against medicine as a career and switched to architecture. After graduating from the University of Pennsylvania in 1943, he joined the merchant marine and moved to New York, where worked as a floor walker for Lord & Taylor, making $25/week.

=== Career ===
Wolkowsky returned to Philadelphia to restore buildings in the inner city. Under the name David Williams, to avoid anti-Semitism, he began the rejuvenation of Society Hill and Rittenhouse Square; his projects received accolades from Town & Country magazine in 1955.

Wolkowsky returned to Key West in late 1962, after the death of his father, Isaac Wolkowsky, to deal with the properties that he inherited from his father. Unable to retire, he rescued a condemned bar on family land on Greene Street, which was the original home of "Sloppy Joe's" of Ernest Hemingway fame. From there, he developed property on lower Duval and Front Streets including "Pirate's Alley" and the "Original Cigar Factory". In 1963, Wolkowsky acquired the old Cuban Ferry Dock, choice waterfront property near Mallory Square, for $106,000.

Wolkowsky lifted the 1890 Porter Steamship office off of its foundation and moved it 300 feet (91 m) out, setting it on pilings in 40 feet (12 m) of water. He transformed the Steamship office into "Tony's Fish Market", a restaurant and cocktail lounge where guests could watch shrimp boats in the channel on their way into port.

==== Pier House ====
In 1967, Wolkowsky hired architect Yiannis B. Antonidis to help design a motel around the restaurant, with 50 unique rooms, to which 50 more rooms that faced the ocean were quickly added. The completed structure was named "Pier House Resort Motel".

The Pier House became a destination for celebrities and media types, mostly because of Wolkowsky's unique personality and laissez-faire attitude, as well as his acute public relations; he invited celebrities as well as photographers to get press coverage.

In the late 1970s, Mr. Wolkowsky sold the hotel for $4.6 million.

==== Ballast Key ====
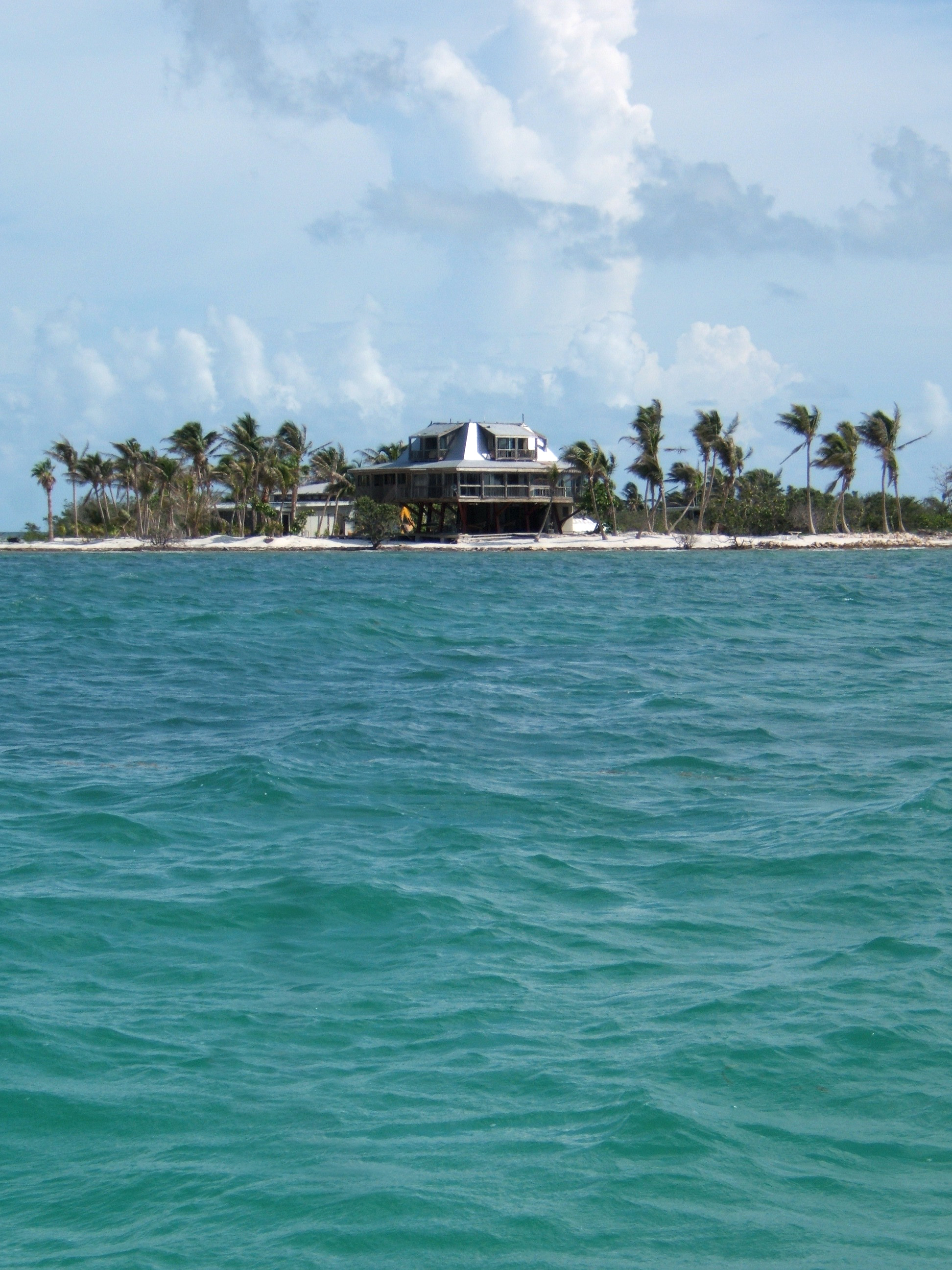
Ballast Key

While building the Pier House, in 1974, Wolkowsky bought Ballast Key, an uninhabited, private island, 8 miles (13 km) off Key West. He built a large house and guest house on the island and entertained many of his writer friends there, including Tennessee Williams and Capote. He is known for serving hot dogs, white wine and potato chips to guests including British Prime Minister Edward Heath, various Rockefellers, Mellons and Vanderbilts. During construction of the island, Wolkowsky sent his private barge out to the island loaded with building supplies as well as with chocolate pudding and souffles, from The Pier House kitchens, for his laborers. He donated the island to The Nature Conservancy and the U.S. Fish and Wildlife Service.

== Philanthropy ==
In 2000, Wolkowsky created a Teacher Merit Awards fund, which gives $5,000 to each of nine Key West teachers as well as a $25,000 award to a single teacher each year; the fund continues after his death.

Wolkowsky's collection of Tennessee Williams paintings were exhibited at the Jewish Museum of Florida-FIU. His art collection was gifted to the Key West Historical Society upon his death.

== Personal life ==
He enjoyed driving a 1926 Rolls-Royce.

Due to his friendship with Tennessee Williams, whom he first met in Philadelphia, Wolkowsky was a pallbearer at his funeral.

Wolkowsky rented his bamboo-covered waterfront trailer to Truman Capote, who wanted to spend the winter in Key West. Capote's Answered Prayers was written there. Discarded handwritten pages were often given to Wolkowsky by Capote. Years later, the papers were reportedly stolen from Wolkowsky's penthouse apartment, high atop Key West's former S. H. Kress & Co. five and dime. Wolkowsky had restored the building, renting out the ground floor to department store "Fast Buck Freddies" and the upper floors to the Key West Parole Department.

In April 1993, a street adjoining the Key West Historical Society was named "David Wolkowsky Street" in his honor.
