= Vivian Yeiser Laramore =

American poet

- Poet
- Born: November 16, 1892; Saint Louis, Missouri
- Died: December 21, 1975; Miami, Florida
- Occupation: Poet
- Spouse(s): Robert Eugene Laramore (1912–1936); Paul C. Rader (1946–1975)

Vivian Yeiser Laramore (born Vivian K. Yeiser, 1892 – 1975) was Florida's second Poet Laureate from 1931–1975. After her second marriage, she used the name Vivian Laramore Rader. She was a teacher of poetry and created the Laramore-Rader Poetry Group from her home in Miami, Florida. She is the first and only woman Poet Laureate of Florida.

== Biography ==
Vivian K. Yeiser was born in Saint Louis, Missouri, on November 16, 1892. She was the daughter of William and Carrie Blaine Yeiser. Her father worked in Dr. McRae's Drug Store in Sanford, Florida. She had a half-brother from her father's first marriage. The family moved to Jacksonville when she was a child to open the Tropical Bottling Company.

In high school, Vivian Yeiser was editor of The Oracle, Duval High School's literary magazine. She published her first poems in this magazine, including "Four American Poets" and "The Marshes of the Saint John's."

In April 1912, Vivian Yeiser married Robert Eugene Laramore, a traveling salesman. Laramore moved to Miami, Florida in 1916 to follow the Florida Land Boom, and Vivian followed him in 1920. She lived in Miami for the rest of her life.

In 1936, Robert Laramore died. In 1946, she met Paul C. Rader, a civil engineer in Miami. They married on September 3, 1946, in Henderson, North Carolina.

Laramore died in 1975 in Miami at age 83.

== Poetry ==
After moving to Miami in 1920, Laramore published over 50 poems in 13 magazines from 1920–1923, including the Ladies' Home Journal, Woman's World and Contemporary Verse. Her first collection of poetry, called Poems, appeared in 1924. Her second collection, Green Acres, was published in 1926.

She had a strong collaboration with her neighbor Mana-Zucca, starting when the composer set Laramore's poem "My Florida" to music. She also worked with Olive Dungan Pullen.

In 1930, she began holding weekly meetings at her home, called the Laramore Poetry Group. One of the first speakers was Charles Torrey Simpson. These weekly meetings continued until and after her death. She taught poetry at her home until her death.

Laramore was appointed Poet Laureate of Florida by Governor Doyle E. Carlton in 1931.

She was a member of the American Society of Composers, Authors, and Publishers and past president of the Miami branch of the National League of American Pen Women.

After her appointment to Poet Laureate, she began publishing in the Miami Daily News every Sunday. Her column, Miami Muse, featured over 780 local poets for over 15 years.

After the death of her husband Robert Laramore in 1936, Vivian was invited by Rollins College Vice-President Grover to teach a poetry class in Blowing Rock, North Carolina. She taught at the Huckleberry Mountain Artist's Colony every summer from 1936 until 1955.

She was close friends with Hannah Kahn.

== Style ==
She created the "quatern" form of poetry, a variation of the Kyrielle. This is a sixteen-line poem composed of four quatrain stanzas, where the first line of stanza 1 is repeated in each quatrain: the second line of stanza 2, the third line of stanza 3, and the fourth line of stanza 4.

Laramore preferred contemporary poetry and disliked reading prose. She named Edna St. Vincent Millay, Sara Teasdale, Robert Frost, and Robinson Jeffers as poets she liked to read. Robert Frost said of her, "To me Florida will always be the poetry of Vivian Laramore Rader."

== Published works ==
The poem "Keys" (also titled "Today") is one of her most widely-published. It often appeared in periodicals and self-help books.

I’ve shut the door on Yesterday,
Its sorrows and mistakes;
I’ve locked within its gloomy walls
Past failures and heartaches.

And now I throw the key away
To seek another room,
And furnish it with hope and smiles,
And every springtime bloom.

No thought shall enter this abode
That has a hint of pain,
And every malice and distrust
Shall never therein reign.

I’ve shut the door on Yesterday,
And thrown the key away.
Tomorrow holds no doubt for me,
Since I have found Today.

=== Poems ===
- Green Acres (1926)
- Flamingo (1932)
- Florida Poets: being an anthology of poems published in the Miami Daily News (1933)
- The technique of poetry, as taught by Vivian Yeiser Laramore (1938)
- Had Sappho written sonnets (1939)
- Poinciana poems (1953)
- Ode to Life and selected Poems (1967)

=== Musical scores ===
- "When you are near" (1925, with Blanche Crook)
- "Mango Moon" (1936, with Olive Dungan)
- "My Florida" (1937, with Mana-Zucca)
- "Tropic Sea Melody" (1949, with Olive Dungan)

== Honours, decorations, awards and distinctions ==
- Poet Laureate of Florida (1931–1975)
- Bishop Prize (1929)
