= Poet Laureate of Florida =

The state poet of Florida is the poet laureate for the U.S. state of Florida. Poets laureate of Florida are appointed by the governor and the Division of Arts and Culture. They first served lifetime, unpaid appointments, until June 20, 2014, when HB 513 established a four-year term.

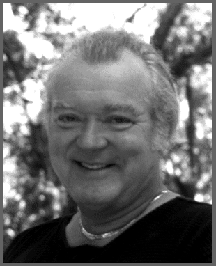
Edmund Skellings was poet laureate in 1980.

== List of poets laureate ==
- Franklin N. Wood (1929)
- Vivian Laramore Rader (1931–1975)
- Edmund Skellings (1980–2012)
- Peter Meinke (2015–present)

== See also ==
- Poet laureate
- List of U.S. state poets laureate
- United States Poet Laureate
