= Joop Sanders =

American painter (1921–2023)

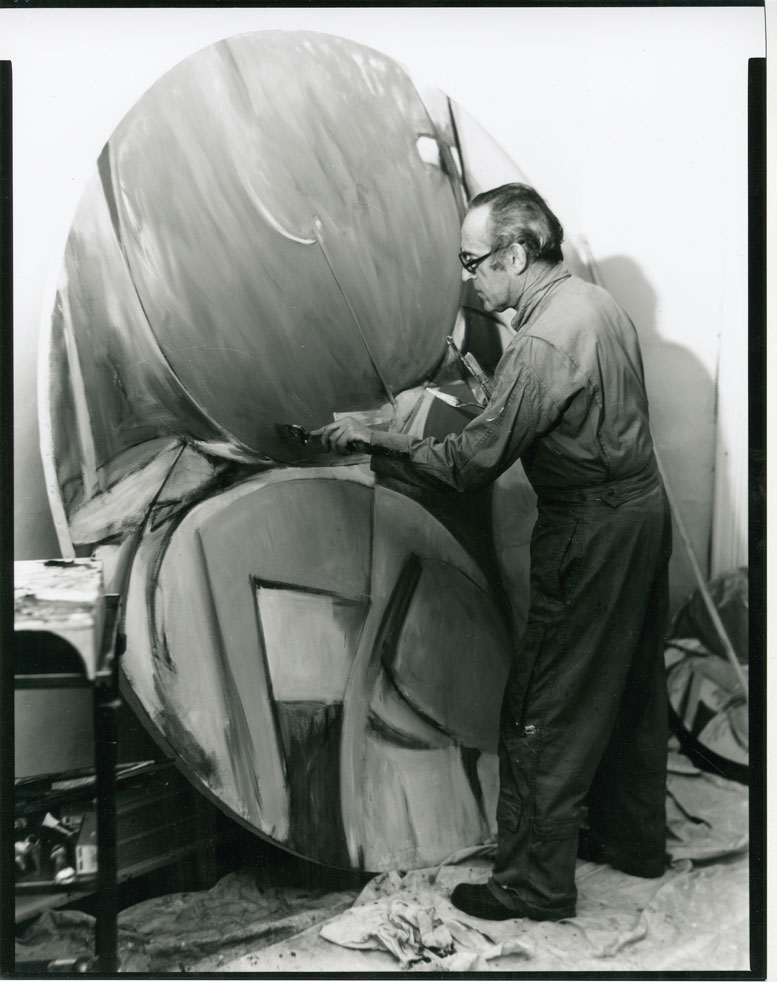
- Joop Sanders in his studio, circa 1980
- Born: Joan Alfred Levy; October 6, 1921; Amsterdam, Netherlands
- Died: July 6, 2023 (aged 101); Putnam County, New York, U.S.
- Education: Art Students League of New York
- Style: Painting
- Movement: Abstract Expressionism, The New York School

Joop Sanders (October 6, 1921 – July 6, 2023) was a Dutch-American painter, educator, and founding member of the American Abstract Expressionist group. He was the youngest member of the first generation of the New York School.

Sanders' work is held in the collections of the Museum of Modern Art, Madison Museum of Contemporary Art, and Philadelphia Museum of Art.

== Early life and education ==
Sanders was born on October 6, 1921, in Amsterdam, the Netherlands and emigrated to the United States in 1939. He studied in 1940 at the Art Students League of New York, in New York City, for six months with artist George Grosz.

In 1940 Sanders met Elaine de Kooning and Willem de Kooning at a concert featuring the music of Virgil Thomson, Aaron Copland and William Schuman. By the mid-1940s, Elaine de Kooning had painted approximately a dozen portraits of Sanders, which seem to express loneliness and androgyny. Sanders spoke at Elaine de Kooning's memorial service.

== Work ==
Sanders was one of twenty original members and a charter member of The Club, which was located at 39 East 8th Street. Sanders married Isca Jörgensen at The Club on December 27, 1950. Until his death, he was the only surviving artist to have exhibited at the historic 9th Street Show of 1951.

In the mid-1950's Sanders left New York for Europe. This move—just at the time abstract expressionism was being accepted in America—resulted, however, in his being overlooked as one of the first younger artists to contribute to the style in New York. Sanders established a considerable European reputation and exhibited extensively in Europe. In addition, his inclusion in exhibitions with the Zero Group, curated by Enrico Castellani and Piero Manzoni connected his work with many of the leading Italian artists of the period, including Manzoni.

Sanders returned to New York in 1959, where his work became almost monochromatic and fieldlike. It never was impersonal; he always retained an emotional content.

In 1960 he was the first young American painter to be given a one-man show at the Stedelijk Museum in Amsterdam, which played a crucial role in introducing advanced American art to Europe.

During the late 1960s, Sanders created sectional paintings which would be arranged in a variety of configurations by the owner or even construed as three-dimensional sculpture.

Horizon Magazine's art critic, Hiram Butler, described Sanders' painting "Pantagruel, 1955" as roughly painted and reflects abstract-expressionist Angst at its fullest. Yet, like its namesake from Rabelais' work, it is also good-humored. American commercial colors elevate the pitch and serve to delight. Along with the serious express there is a capricious and fanciful, almost mocking stroke. Sanders' "Gong, 1979", places the power of abstract-expressionist color and painterliness within a more formal and refined structure. Shapes are larger than in his earlier work. the dominant purples, deep greens, and pinks are rich and more closely hued. The combination results in a powerful, serene rhythm. When asked about reincorporating earlier tendencies in his art, Sanders responds, "the artist is like Sisyphus, punished by Zeus to try forever to roll a rock uphill which forever rolls back upon him."

Art critic Lawrence Campbell in describing Sanders' work for Art in America in 1987 at Alfred Kren Gallery in New York remarked: "These paintings are like spirit photographs in which the spirit reaches out and touches the viewer. Barnett Newman once said to Sanders on seeing paintings like these, “Of all the painters working in the context of color field, you seem to me to be the only one who, like, me, concerns himself with the humanist spirit in painting.

The New York Times critic Joseph Masheck in reviewing the Kren show stated:

"It is nice to see somebody stick to his guns and have the world catch up. Joop (pronounced Yope) Sanders came to New York from Amsterdam in 1939 as a teen-ager; 10 years later, he was the youngest founding member of The Club, of those most radical painters of the day, the Abstract Expressionists. We would probably know him better by now if he hadn't been back in Europe during the later 50's. In sampling two separate decades, the 60's and the 80's, this exhibition provokes a bracing double take. First comes a glowing roomful of paintings, each practically a monochrome but divided into rounded zones, from 1962 and 1963. Here a spiritual purity akin to Ad Reinhardt's, though more lyrical, makes itself felt. Then, in another room, are works of the present, some on paper startlingly like paintings by that compatriot of Sanders', Willem de Kooning. In a different vein, two small canvases, Pogrom (1984) and Interrogation Room (1986), would be morally serious even without the titles. Toughly sensitive and in more than one sense reviving are some small recent drawings and watercolors: in these the Orientalizing calligraphies of artists and poets and others who refused to buy into the American 50's are renewed with winning finesse and timely conviction by an individualist still unspoiled.

== Personal life ==
Sanders was married for 68 years to the lieder singer Isca Sanders-Jörgensen (1925–2019). His son is the sculptor, John Sanders and his daughter is the attorney, Karin Greenfield-Sanders. His son-in-law is the photographer Timothy Greenfield-Sanders and his grandchildren include artist Isca Greenfield-Sanders and filmmaker Liliana Greenfield-Sanders.

Sanders died at his home in Putnam County, New York, on July 6, 2023, at the age of 101.

== Exhibitions ==
- 9th Street Art Exhibition, 60 East 9th Street, 1951
- "Joop Sanders" 1959 Stedelijk Museum
- "Joop Sanders" 1965 Bertha Schaefer Gallery
- Abstractions, Museum of Modern Art (MoMA), New York City, 1988/89
- Dubuffet to de Kooning: Expressionist Prints from Europe and America, Museum of Modern Art (MoMA), New York City, 1998/99
- Sanders and Greenfield-Sanders, Snitzer Gallery, Miami, FL, 2003
- Elaine de Kooning Portrayed, Pollock-Krasner House and Study Center, East Hampton, New York, 2015
- Elaine de Kooning: Portraits, National Portrait Gallery, Washington, D.C., 2015/16
- Galerie Biedermann, 2021/22

== Collections ==
Sanders' work is held in the following permanent collections:

- Museum of Modern Art, New York: 1 work (as of 16 November 2022)
- Stedelijk Museum, Amsterdam, Netherlands
- Madison Museum of Contemporary Art, Madison, Wisconsin
- Philadelphia Museum of Art, Philadelphia, PA

== See also ==
- Abstract expressionism
- Abstract impressionism
- Action painting
- New York School
- 10th Street galleries
