= May Ling Su =

Filipino pornographic actress

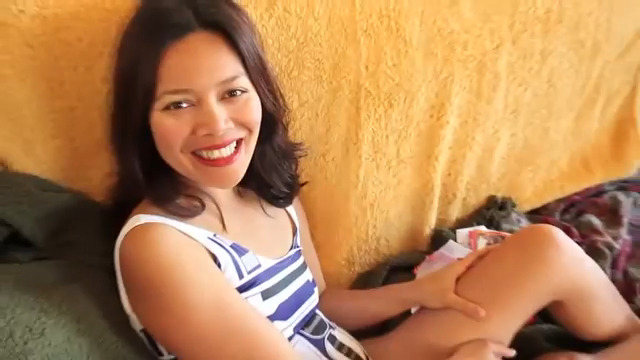
- Su in 2011
- Born: 1973 (age 52–53); Philippines
- Website: http://maylingsu.com

May Ling Su (born 1973) is a pornographic actress, feminist, and self-described "menstrual artist".

== Career ==
Su earned a bachelor's degree in Communication Arts from the Ateneo de Manila before she moved to the United States, where she first started out in the adult film industry in 1996 by making movies with her husband, Jay. She still primarily directs herself but has also worked with other directors, including Max Hardcore in 2002.

In 2010, she published the art book On My Period, in which she had made art out of her menstrual blood. That same year, she was also named one of the Porn Saints (known for their "pornoartistic approach to religion") by the art project of the same name.

Su has been portrayed by many other artists, including American photographer Timothy Greenfield-Sanders (who has dubbed her as one of the 30 most important porn stars in America), in his book XXX: 30 Porn-Star Portraits and his HBO documentary Thinking XXX in 2004, and by Swedish punk painter Karl Backman for The Museum of Porn in Art in Zürich in 2011. Another portrait of her is on permanent display at the Erotisch Museum in Amsterdam.

== Awards and nominations ==
- 2010 Good For Her Feminist Porn Award Website Nominee – OnMyPeriod.com
