= Garth C. Reeves Sr. =

Newspaper publisher

Garth Coleridge Reeves Sr. (February 12, 1919 – November 25, 2019) was the Publisher of the Miami Times from 1970–1994, when he was then named Publisher Emeritus. Inducted in 2017 to the National Association of Black Journalists (NABJ) Hall of Fame he was for the latter half of the 20th century an African American voice in Miami, Florida, having taken over his fathers duties as publisher after WWII.

== Early life ==
Reeves was born in Nassau, Bahamas to Rachel (née Cooper) and Henry Ethelbert Sigismund Reeves. The family immigrated to the United States when Reeves was 4 months old and he grew up in Miami’s Overtown and Liberty City.

Reeves memories of the overt racism he and others faced helped to shape the activist he became during the Civil Rights Era. Recalling his time in the Boy Scouts in Jim Crow 1935, he articulated not being able to advance in the Scouts, due to the lack of facilities for blacks to take swimming lessons or take the practical tests for the required badges. There were no public pools for blacks in the south at the time and public beaches were restricted. He and his friends sold newspapers and candy to raise funds for a sleep-away scouting jamboree for blacks in Jacksonville.

The only job Reeves ever had, other than his stint in the segregated Army during World War II, was at the one sheet tabloid for the black community started by his father in 1923. He worked at the paper from high school until his retirement in 1994.

Reeves graduated from the historically black college and university, Florida A&M University, before enlisting. After returning from Europe at the end of World War II and encountering racism at home he became dispirited, giving his mother a list of places other than Miami he felt were more accommodating to African-Americans.

== The Miami Times ==
Reeves had returned to Miami in 1946, his father Henry E. Sigismund Reeves was running The Miami Times which was a 'race' tabloid, catering to the black community. A strict disciplinarian and teetotaler, the Episcopalian church elder Reeves was cast in the mold of an old-fashioned leader. His paper was printed on a hand press in single pages in a room set aside for it. Henry opposed the bus boycotts the Rev. Martin Luther King Jr. was promoting to fight for civil rights in Montgomery, Alabama. He disapproved of Bus boycotts for Miami in his column as they placed church people in jeopardy. His son was on the opposing spectrum, having fought for freedom in Europe and not being as patient with the Jim Crow policies of the south.

Garth held every job at one time or the other at the paper and the energy he devoted drove the Times to grow during the 1950s and 1960s. Reeves fought against laws upholding segregation with acts of civil disobedience. In 1949, blacks were not allowed to play at the public golf courses during the week, but were allowed on Monday, the one day the sprinklers were on. Garth brought friends to play on a Wednesday. He and his friends filed suit for access to the fairways, basing their claim on taxes paid in upkeep and maintenance of the courses. Their suit was successful after a court case that lasted seven years. This led to the desegregation of the Miami Springs golf course in 1959.

While not subscribing to the non-violence philosophy of Martin Luther King Jr. during the run up to the March on Washington; he reported on the movement in the periodical faithfully. Fighting against inequality was his passion which he pursued with his pen using the Times as his platform. ‘CONSCIENCE OF THE BLACK COMMUNITY’ is how his editorials were described, he consistently used very different wording than other papers to describe the riots that swept into Florida after police shootings, calling them 'protests' instead, as Reeves later described The Miami Times’ editorial policy in a 1999 interview.

Reeves called the conflagrations "rebellion" and "protests" in The Miami Times as he believed they spoke to the community’s frustration after years of continuing police brutality. He even called for the removal of politicians and imbued social causes and candidates with his imprimatur. “For many, the Miami Times became the conscience of the black community,” Dorothy Jenkins Fields, the founder of the Black Archives, History and Research Foundation of South Florida, wrote. “He was not afraid and he was not intimidated. He was dedicated to uplifting the race and he was not afraid to throw rocks and hide his hands to get the power structure’s attention to the difficulties and the inequalities of the black community. He dedicated his life to that,” said Fields in a statement.

In 1957, Reeves and other black leaders took their tax bills to a meeting with white officials in an effort to integrate Dade County beaches. “We’re law-abiding, tax-paying citizens,” they said, “and we’re going swimming this afternoon at Crandon Park.” When the men arrived at the beach, they were met by angry policemen lining the beachfront, but the black men were eventually unmolested for testing the waters in a brief dip.

“From that day we swam at all the beaches,” Reeves later recounted. Reeves developed his writing voice in the middle of the civil rights era when he ascended to managing editor of The Times. Under his tutelage, the Times pressed the power of the black voter.

He also came to understandings with the white business establishment in the downtown Miami, joining the mostly white Greater Miami Chamber of Commerce in 1968. He also courted various charities like the United Way, the Boy Scouts and other philanthropic endeavors that the downtown clique perceived as the litmus test of civic involvement.

He inherited the paper when Henry died in 1970. The paper was the basis of Reeves’ small fortune. He invested the profits in bank stock and real estate, owning a 5 percent share of Miami’s Bayside Marketplace, located in the thriving downtown. Reeves became a life member of the NAACP and founding member of Miami’s Episcopal Church of the Incarnation. His calls to action matched his editorials as printed in the Times. It was he who secured the family ownership of the Times as it evolved into the current digital edition helmed by his grandson, Garth Basil, whom succeeded his daughter, Rachel, who also passed in 2019. She had been the latest publisher of The Miami Times, assuming the mantle of leadership from her father and grandfather in 1994.

Reeves was a member of the Non-Group, a civically influential group of Miami-Dade business elites.

== Publisher Emeritus ==
He retired from the day to day operation and assumed the mantle of elder statesman, active in civic affairs into his 98th year. In 2017 he was inducted into the National Association of Black Journalists (NABJ) Hall of Fame. “I have admired the organization since it started. Black journalists and the black press are up against formidable foes and we have to keep fighting and not give up. It makes you feel good when you are recognized by your peers and, being in the business, at 98, I feel good,” he told The Miami Times.

“These valiant soldiers without swords not only excelled in their chosen field, they also brought others along with them. We stand on their shoulders,” Sarah Glover, NABJ president at the time, said in announcing the award.

City and county leaders in 2017 designated Northwest Sixth Street as Garth C. Reeves Way.

In 2019, the City of Miami Commission honored Reeves on the occasion of his 100th birthday.

== Death ==
After Rachel passed at age 69 in September, 2019, Reeves' health declined. He died of complications from pneumonia two months later, on November 25, at his home in Aventura, Fla. He was 100.

== See also ==
- Ruth W. Greenfield
- African-American newspapers
- Black Newspapers
