= Thinking XXX =

- Directed by: Timothy Greenfield-Sanders
- Starring: Sunrise Adams; Belladonna; Christy Canyon; Chloe; Nina Hartley; Jenna Jameson; Jasmine; Ron Jeremy; Peter North
- Theme music composer: Sebastian Blanck; Mary Louise Platt
- Original language: English

Production
- Producer: Timothy Greenfield-Sanders
- Cinematography: Lukas Hauser
- Editors: Lukas Hauser; Erik Kissack
- Running time: 43 min

Original release
- Release: October 29, 2004

Thinking XXX is a 2004 documentary television film about the process photographer Timothy Greenfield-Sanders went through to create his book XXX: 30 Porn Star Portraits.

== Content ==
The film shows Greenfield-Sanders as he shoots portraits of thirty porn stars, both clothed and naked, for the book, as well as presenting conversations and interviews with the performers, along with authors, artists and filmmakers outside of the pornography industry. For the portraits, Greenfield-Sanders uses an antique view camera, as both a challenge to his photographic skills, and to have negatives large enough to create oversized exhibition prints for gallery exhibitions.

The film was produced for broadcast on the HBO cable TV channel and was never released to theaters, and was therefore not rated by the Motion Picture Association of America.

== Reception ==
A review in Houston Voice said that the film "did something that many in the past have tried and failed to do: humanize porn stars".

== List of portrait subjects ==
- Sunrise Adams
- Briana Banks
- Belladonna
- Seymore Butts
- Christy Canyon
- Chloe
- Nina Hartley
- Heather Hunter
- Jenna Jameson
- Jesse Jane
- Ron Jeremy
- Jeremy Jordan
- Reina Leone
- Michael Lucas
- Gina Lynn
- Ginger Lynn
- Sean Michaels
- Sharon Mitchell
- Peter North
- Tera Patrick
- Mari Possa
- Lukas Ridgeston
- Savanna Samson
- Aiden Shaw
- Lexington Steele
- May Ling Su

== Soundtrack ==
Track listing:

1. AA XXX - Peaches
2. Hot In Here - Tiga
3. Muscle Car (Reform Reprise) - Mylo
4. Coochie Coo - Felix da Housecat with Princess Superstar
5. Train - Goldfrapp
6. I Want To Be Your Dog - Futon
7. Lovesucker - Xlover
8. Sugar - Ladytron
9. Leave Them All Behind - Whitey
10. Rock And Roll (Part 3) - Virgin Tears
11. Freak Like Me - Heather Hunter with DJ Premier
12. Time Bomb - Rabbit in the Moon
13. HLM - Moderato
14. Here She Comes - Velvet Underground
