= Joan Field =

American violinist (1915–1988)

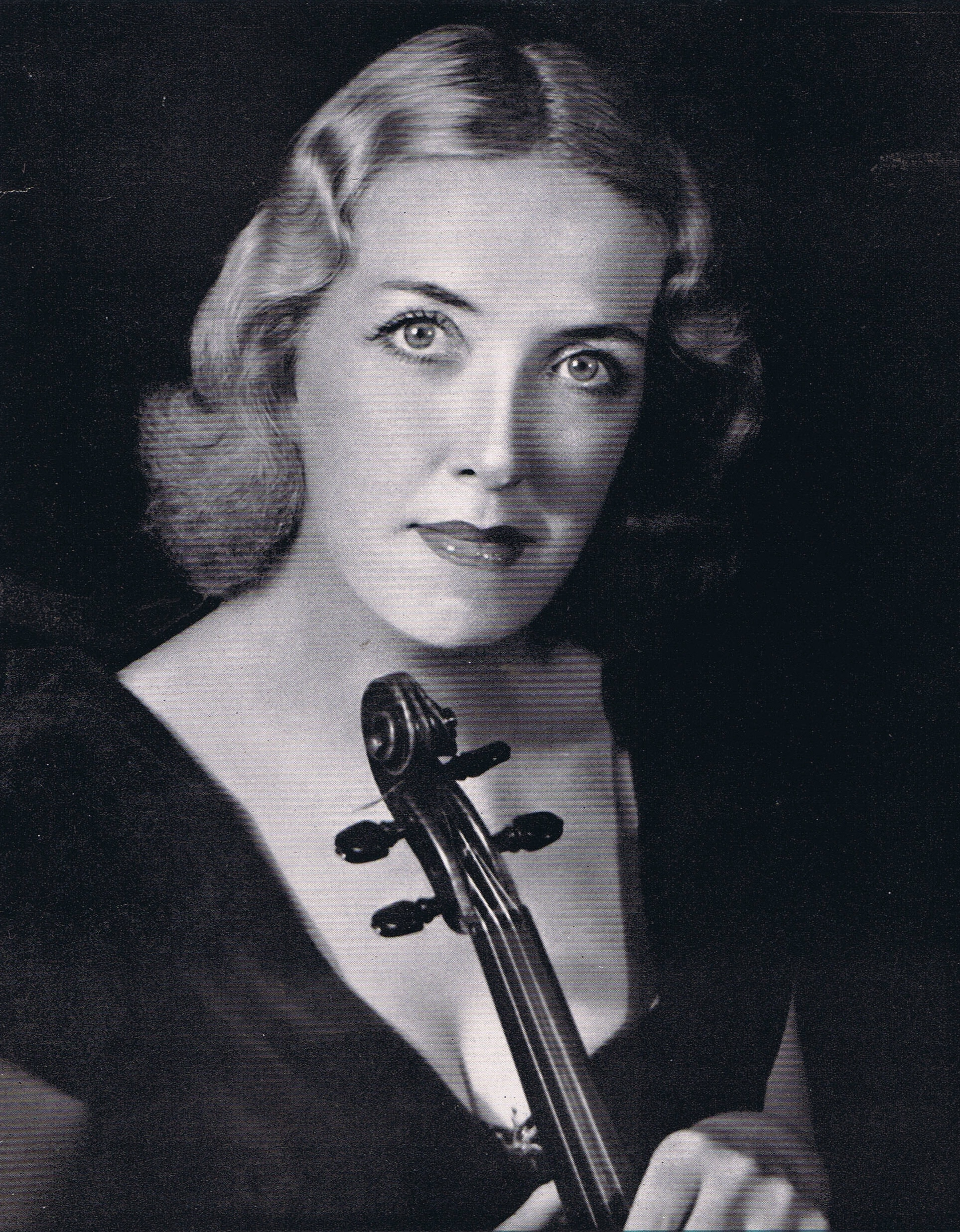
- Born: April 28, 1915
- Died: March 18, 1988 (aged 72)
- Occupation: Violinist

Joan Field (April 28, 1915 – March 18, 1988) was an American violinist.

== Biography and career ==
Joan Field was born in Long Branch, New Jersey. She began violin studies at the age of 5. She was a pupil of Franz Kneisel, Albert Spalding and Michel Piastro in the United States and spent four years in Paris during her teens studying with Jacques Chailley, Jacques Thibaud and George Enescu at the École Normale de Musique.

She made her recital debut in Town Hall in New York City in 1934. About that evening, The New York Times wrote, "Miss Field's playing is that of a thoughtful, sensitive and fastidious musician." She made her orchestra debut in November, 1941, playing the Saint-Saens Concerto #3 with Sir John Barbirolli and the New York Philharmonic. She went on to perform with major orchestras in the United States, including the American Symphony Orchestra, the Detroit Symphony, the St. Louis Symphony, the Boston Symphony, the Cincinnati Symphony, the Cleveland Orchestra, the Philadelphia Orchestra and the Washington Symphony; and five solo performances with the New York Philharmonic at Lewisohn Stadium and Carnegie Hall.

In 1937 she played in recital for President and Mrs. Franklin D. Roosevelt at the White House. During the 1940s Field was a regular on the New York City music scene. She was concertmistress for the U.S. tour of the Ballet Russe de Monte Carlo during World War II, reprising that position for the original Broadway production of Brigadoon in 1947.

In 1944 she began a successful radio career at New York classical station WQXR, writing and producing more than 200 episodes of her own performance-interview program "Notes and Quotes" on Sunday afternoons and appearing as soloist and concertmistress of the Stromberg-Carlson string orchestra.

She made the first recording of the Charles Ives Sonata No. 1 for violin and piano along with the 3rd Sonata with pianist Leopold Mittman. She also gave first performances of the violin concertos of Nicolai Berezowsky, Mana Zucca and Dai-Keong Lee, and in 1948 the first American performance of the Prokofiev Violin Sonata No. 2 in Washington, DC.

Her annual Town Hall recital in 1956 elicited this commentary in The New York Times: "Miss Field is a rare combination, an extremely facile technician who also comprehends that the task of the performer is to make music rather than to set a new record for the track. It is true that in bravura playing Miss Field is by no means found wanting; but mere technique is never allowed to get in the way of the music."

In 1959, she was a soloist with the Naumburg Orchestral Concerts, in the Naumburg Bandshell, Central Park, in the summer series.

Field performed and recorded extensively in Europe during the 1950s and early 1960s, notably with expatriate American conductor Dean Dixon. Her instrument during those years was a 1698 "long pattern" Stradivarius once owned by Joseph Joachim She also appeared as piano accompanist with string player colleagues.

A longtime resident of Miami Beach, Florida, she retired from the concert stage in 1965. She died in Miami Beach in 1988 .

== Discography ==
On Telefunken:

- Dvorak Violin Concerto in a minor/ Beethoven Romances for Violin and Orchestra; Berlin Symphony, Artur Rother, Conductor TCS 18046
- Bruch Concerto #1 in g minor/Mendelssohn Concerto in e minor; Berlin Symphony, Rudolf Albert, Conductor. 6.41308 AG and n.t. 1968
- Bruch Concerto #1 in g minor/Spohr Concerto in a minor "Gesangszene"; Berlin Symphony, Rudolf Albert, Conductor. LT 6634 and TCS 18031
- Mozart Concerto #5 in A/ Mendelssohn Concerto in e minor; Berlin Symphony, Rudolf Albert, Conductor. TC 8044

On Lyrichord:

- Charles Ives Sonatas 1 and 3 for violin and piano (with Leopold Mittman). LL 17
