= Ruth W. Greenfield =

American concert pianist and teacher (1923–2023)

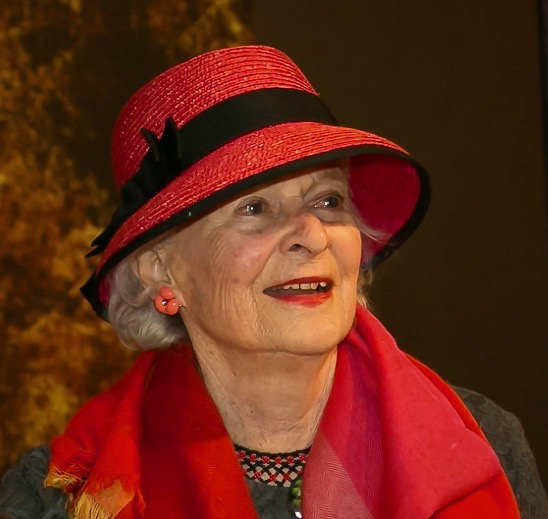
- Greenfield in 2018

Background information
- Birth name: Ruth Miriam Wolkowsky
- Born: November 17, 1923; Key West, Florida, U.S.
- Died: July 27, 2023 (aged 99); Miami, Florida, U.S.

Ruth Miriam Greenfield (née Wolkowsky; November 17, 1923 – July 27, 2023) was an American concert pianist and teacher who, through music, broke racial barriers and brought together black and white students, taught by black and white teachers. This pioneering color-blind approach, considered scandalous at the time, was a breath of fresh air in the then-segregated society.

== Biography ==
Ruth Miriam Wolkowsky was born in Key West, Florida, on November 17, 1923. At age six months she moved to Miami and was raised there. While growing up, she was unaware of the pervasive segregation of the time, except when visiting her grandparents in Spring Garden. Across the railroad tracks from there was the neighborhood then called Colored Town, and now called Overtown. This town seemed like a strange other world, in which black people had a servile role, doing laundry for white people.

Greenfield began studying piano at age 5, and later studied with Mana-Zucca, who moved from New York to Miami. Greenfield graduated from Miami Beach High School in 1941, then studied for two years at the University of Miami, then obtained her bachelor's and master's degrees in music at the University of Michigan in Ann Arbor. While studying with the renowned pianist Artur Schnabel, she broke more racial taboos by dating a classmate who was a young black man from Jamaica. She returned to the University of Miami again to teach piano.

Greenfield later left Miami for Paris, France, in 1949, in order to study composition with Nadia Boulanger, the teacher of successful composers including Aaron Copland, Elliott Carter, Quincy Jones, Philip Glass, Virgil Thomson, and Astor Piazzolla. Paris of that time was refreshingly integrated, with integration considered as the norm. In Paris, she married Miami attorney Arnold Merwin Greenfield, a graduate of Harvard Law School. He enjoyed painting and cooking and listening to his wife play the piano. Her maid of honor at the small Paris wedding was a black pianist Lois Towles from Arkansas.

Upon returning to segregated Miami, Greenfield wanted to do something about the situation. She founded, in 1951, the Fine Arts Conservatory, one of the first fully integrated schools for music, art and dance in the South.

Greenfield was motivated by her friendship with school principal Mary Ford Williams, whose son, James "Jimmy" Ford, a Juilliard School graduate, had found doors to Miami's music establishment and competitions closed to him. During the early years, the school moved between black and white neighborhoods, holding classes in such locations as private homes, a Masonic lodge, a YMCA and the most notorious location, a storage room for caskets that reeked of formaldehyde, in an Overtown funeral home. On May 9, 1953, Greenfield's Fine Arts Conservatory student, 15-year-old James Ford performed at an otherwise all-white recital at Miami Memorial Library thanks to Greenfield having alerted Jack Bell, a Miami Herald columnist who wrote about the issue.

By 1961, the conservatory had raised enough money to buy a small run-down house in the vicinity of N.W. 60th Street and 7th Avenue that served as its permanent headquarters, until it closed in 1978. The Fine Arts Conservatory eventually expanded to six branches throughout Dade County. Prominent community leaders, including Congresswoman Carrie Meek, continued to steer talented students to the school.

Greenfield continued to teach for 32 years at what is today Miami Dade College, Florida's first integrated college. She founded Miami-Dade Community College's Lunchtime Lively Arts Series in the late 1970s and made it all-encompassing (including music, theater, and literature). The wide-ranging list of artists who performed include Isaac Bashevis Singer, Dick Gregory, Odetta, The Ink Spots, Virgil Thomson and Gwendolyn Brooks. In the fall of 2011, the college rededicated its Wolfson Campus auditorium in Greenfield's honor.

Greenfield's family has also been influential in the arts. Her children include New York City photographer Timothy Greenfield-Sanders, Miami cultural critic Charles D. Greenfield, published clinical social worker Alice Greenfield, and golfer Frank Greenfield. Key West preservationist David Wolkowsky is her brother. Her grandchildren include filmmaker Liliana Greenfield-Sanders and painter Isca Greenfield-Sanders. She is survived by a total of seven grandchildren and five great grandchildren.

In 2013, director Steve Waxman released a feature documentary, Instruments of Change, about Greenfield and her history with the Fine Arts Conservatory. The film featured Miami personalities including Eduardo Padron, Marvis Martin, Garth Reeves, and Carrie Meek. The same year, Posse Miami honored her for her contributions to education in Miami.

On November 18, 2022, a day after she celebrated her 99th birthday, the city of Miami co-designated the street where Greenfield lived as Ruth Greenfield Way. In December 2022 Ruth Greenfield received the FSMTA Breaking Barriers Award. She died in Miami on July 27, 2023, at the age of 99. On April 13, 2024, Ruth W. Greenfield was awarded (posthumously) the Parker Thomson Legacy Award by The Adrienne Arsht Center for the Performing Arts of Miami-Dade County. Her son, Charles D. Greenfield, accepted the award representing her family.
