= Isca Greenfield-Sanders =

American painter

- Born: 1978 (age 47–48); New York City
- Education: Brown University
- Known for: Painting, works on paper, printmaking
- Spouse: Sebastian Blanck (m. 2003)
- Website: iscags.com

Isca Greenfield-Sanders, Stone Crop, mixed media acrylic on canvas, 51" x 51", 2026.

Isca Greenfield-Sanders (born 1978) is an American artist based in New York City. She is known for vibrant, square-format landscapes depicting outdoor scenes in beach, pool or garden settings, that she reworks from vintage 35mm slides. Critics characterize her art as deceptive in its straightforward presentation and subject matter, contending that it belies a wealth of art-historical references and a sophisticated image-making method which blurs media, digital and manual processes, and the modes of representation and abstraction. Her multi-step process synthesizes the materials, tools and techniques of photography and painting, combining found materials, computer editing, pencil and various paints, and a grid structure. Brooklyn Rail reviewer Raphy Sarkissian observed, "Greenfield-Sanders probes visual representation through various mediums, arriving at imagery whose allure is owed as much to their visual charm as their interrogation of the culturally fabricated realities of picture-making."

Greenfield-Sanders's work belongs to the art collections of the Brooklyn Museum, Fine Arts Museums of San Francisco, Museum of Fine Arts, Houston (MFAH), Solomon R. Guggenheim Museum, and Victoria and Albert Museum, among others. She has exhibited at institutions including the Brooklyn Museum, de Young Museum, Hamburger Kunsthalle, McNay Art Museum, MFAH, MoMA PS1 and the National Gallery of Prague.

== Early life ==
Greenfield-Sanders was born in 1978 in New York City to Karin, a lawyer, and Timothy Greenfield-Sanders, the photographer-filmmaker. She grew up in the artist culture of Manhattan's East Village; her paternal grandmother was concert pianist and teacher Ruth W. Greenfield, her maternal grandmother was Leider singer Isca Sanders, her maternal grandfather was the first-generation abstract expressionist painter Joop Sanders, and her sister is filmmaker, Liliana Greenfield-Sanders.

The artist earned a BA in mathematics and a BFA in visual arts, both in 2000, from Brown University. In 2003, in a wedding officiated by family friend Lou Reed, she married artist Sebastian Blanck. They live and work in New York City.

== Exhibitions ==
Solo exhibitions of Greenfield-Sanders's art have been held at institutions including MoMA PS1 (2003), Museum Morsbroich (Germany, 2006), Museum of Contemporary Art Denver (2010) and Museum of Fine Arts, Houston (2023). She has exhibited at galleries including Goff & Rosenthal and Miles McEnery in New York, Berggruen (San Francisco), Baldwin Gallery (Aspen), Galerie Klüser (Munich), Wetterling Gallery (Stockholm), Dubner Moderne (Lusanne), and Michael Reid (Sydney).

== Work and reception ==
Greenfield-Sanders's technically complex process draws upon her mathematics background and moves repeatedly between hand and machine, employing a precise, logical system that involves geometric structure and seriality. Her work taps deeply into the history of pictorial representation, referencing the use of the grid in both Renaissance perspective and 20th-century abstraction, the camera obscura, photography's journey from inception to popular use, the Pop recycling of Warhol, and digital media. Conceptually, Greenfield-Sanders explores the relationship of still images (photographic and painted) to recollection and nostalgia, the presumed truth of photography, and the ephemerality of memory. The authors of Landscape Painting Now: From Pop Abstraction to New Romanticism summarize these idea, contending that her works "act as a parallel to memory—the original event loses important details in each iteration or 'telling', yet because photographs are perceived as uniquely authentic, the depiction seems unquestionably true."

Isca Greenfield-Sanders, Sky Beach (Blue), mixed media oil on canvas, 14" x 14", 2005.

The artist's images typically originate as anonymous family snapshots from 1950s and 1960s slide archives that she purchases at yard sales or online. She embraces the flaws and mishaps of the cast-off amateur images that digital photography has largely eliminated. After scanning the vintage slides, she edits them digitally, for example, abstracting or removing figures and elements in order to achieve desired formal or emotional effects. She reimagines and refines the altered images using pencil and watercolor, respectively shaping and softening them, and in the process, generates questions about what remains of the original and what was reconfigured.

The small pencil and watercolor studies are enlarged considerably and printed on uniform, square sections of rice paper that she adheres to canvas in tile-like fashion, reforming complete images. She then paints over them in transparent oils or acrylics, leaving faintly visible traces of the original study and geometric grid that create senses of illusory depth and evanescence. Within an overall painting the individual tiles often function like small, independent abstract paintings.

Greenfield-Sanders's fusion of photography and painting produces a sense in the work of wavering between real and unreal, nostalgic and unsettling, and specific and universal; A. M. Homes described her art as "linger[ing] in an ethereal, almost mythic place." The artist reworks images—sometimes creating as many as ten from a single slide—most significantly in terms of color, employing a palette characterized as "luminous, almost hallucinatory," otherworldly, "inventive, and often abstract." From one work to another she frequently swaps out intense azure oceans and skies for bubble-gum pink ones, for example. These sharply delineated color contrasts shift the emotional tone of an image and widen its empathic capacity, enabling what critic Joyce Korotkin termed "subliminal recollections"—distillations of the now-anonymous original moments and a viewer's personal experience.

=== Painting series and bodies of work ===
Greenfield-Sanders's first New York solo show, "Beachwood Park" (2002) established her interest in exploring the historical intersections of and tensions between painting and photography. Its hybrid paintings and works on paper employed digitally sutured figures and elements from vintage slides of summer outings, which the artist recomposed and rendered large in soft, painterly fashion (e.g., Picnic Series (Red Shirt)). She extended these explorations in the atmospheric depictions of lounging seaside families that comprised the "Beach Detail" series (e.g., Sky Beach (Blue), 2005), which reviewers noted for their vibrant color, translucence and vague ring of nostalgia; Deborah Phillips of ARTnews observed that the latter quality was held in check by Greenfield-Sanders's rational process, grid structure and appropriational method.

Isca Greenfield-Sanders, Yellow & Black Parachute (Gold), mixed media oil on canvas, 35" x 35", 2008.

Critics including Donald Kuspit identified a new, Cheever-esque emotional register in the "Pinelawn Pools" works (2006), signified by the sharp juxtaposition in several paintings of a luminous blue swimming pool and encroaching green-black passages representing hedges, forests or shadows. Kuspit observed, "Greenfield-Sanders's paintings are gothic horror tales in disguise: Their secret terror is the suburbs' inescapable ordinariness … they are powerfully emotional allegories of the banality and complacency of everyday life on the outskirts."

Similar in tone, but a departure in subject matter, the "Parachute" series (2008) depicted Korean and Second World War parachute jumpers, substituting open skies for water, painted in bright blues, pinks, golds or black; the paintings conveyed a somewhat disturbing, atypical political perspective, with small figures seemingly paralyzed or hung in midair rather than freed by flight. With the "Light Leaks" works (2010–11, MCA Denver) Greenfield-Sanders delved further into the ambiguities between media in abstracted paintings of children playing soccer and vacation scenes that reproduced the common flaws of traditional amateur photography lens flares, color banding, overexposures, edge frame distortions and light leaks.

In subsequent work, Greenfield- Sanders returned in subject matter to the seaside and began exploring images of largely unpeopled landscapes and fields of flowers (e.g., Stone Crop, 2026). Her exhibition "Keep Them Still" (2017) and the series "Shade My Eyes" (2020) consisted of characteristic mixed-media paintings of sun-dappled beach scenes, waterside landscapes and close-ups of abstracted, rippling waves that registered as both familiar and elusive. Art historian Kris Paulsen wrote of the latter works, "On Greenfield-Sanders's canvases, these American myths seduce at the same time as they unmask themselves as fictions. Even if taken at face value, the original found photographs are fantasies themselves—images captured as much to document as to create selective memories for the future."

The exhibitions "Wildflower Path" (2024) and "Cut from a Dream" (2025) featured harmonious landscapes and idyllic, open fields that conveyed the appeal and vastness of nature, such as Bend in the Road (2023) and Wildflowers and Distant Lake (2024). In their descriptions of these canvases, reviewers referenced the color palette of Fauvism and the plein air method of Impressionism, notwithstanding the work's origins in the studio and in amateur snapshots. The latter show included, for the first time, images sourced from the artist's own personal photographs, in addition to her characteristic found imagery.

=== Printmaking ===
Since 2006, Greenfield-Sanders has undertaken five print projects utilizing aquatint and photogravure in collaboration with Paulson Fontaine Press and a woodcut print with Shore Publishing, Salt Beach (2026), among others. Critic Molly Osberg observed that the artist's prints and paintings "encapsulate the effect of recalling a memory over and over; with time, we gradually forget details, only remembering the strongest colors, lights, shapes, and feelings. This act of repetition and the subtle variation that ensues, makes the artist's practice perfectly aligned with printmaking."

== Collections and other recognition ==
Greenfield-Sanders's work belongs to the public art collections of the Brooklyn Museum, Fine Arts Museums of San Francisco, Hood Museum of Art, Israel Museum Jerusalem, McNay Art Museum, Museum of Fine Arts, Houston, Museum Morsbroich, Palm Springs Art Museum, Solomon R. Guggenheim Museum, Stiftung Reinbeckhallen, Victoria and Albert Museum, and U.S. Art in Embassies, among others.

Greenfield-Sanders has received commissions from Creative Time (2005)—to produce a billboard in Coney Island for the Dreamland Artists Club—and New York City's Art in the Parks (2016), for a series of large outdoor murals created in collaboration with the Children's Museum of the Arts. In 2001, she was a visiting artist at the American Academy in Rome.
