= Dai-Keong Lee =

- Born: September 2, 1915; Honolulu, Hawaii
- Died: December 1, 2005 (aged 90) New York City
- Genre: Classical
- Occupation: Composer

Dai-Keong Lee (September 2, 1915 – December 1, 2005) was an American composer. His Symphony No. 2 was runner up for the 1952 Pulitzer Prize for Music.

== Early life and education ==
He was born in Honolulu, Hawaii, and studied with Roger Sessions at Princeton University, Frederick Jacobi at the Juilliard School of Music, Otto Luening at Columbia University, and Aaron Copland. He is of Chinese descent.

== Music ==
Lee worked as a freelance composer in New York City. He composed six operas, the music for the Broadway comedy Teahouse of the August Moon, a ballet, a ballet suite, two symphonies, a Polynesian suite, a dance piece and a concerto grosso for strings, a string quartet, orchestral songs, choral works, and piano pieces. Joan Field premiered his violin concerto.

In the summers of 1941 and 1942, the New York Philharmonic performed Lee's works "Prelude & Hula" and "Hawaiian Festival Overture" during their summer stadium concerts.

In the 2020s the Hawaiʻi Symphony Orchestra revived Lee's orchestral music, performing his Symphony No. 1 and, in March 2025, his Symphony No. 2. The orchestra has scheduled his Violin Concerto with Jennifer Koh for January 2027.
