= The Miami Times =

Newspaper in Miami, Florida

- Type: Weekly newspaper
- Owner(s): Garth Basil Reeves, III.
- Founder: Henry Ethelbert Sigismund Reeves
- Relaunched: 1923; 102 years ago
- Language: English
- Headquarters: Miami, Florida
- Country: United States
- Website: miamitimesonline.com

The Miami Times is an African-American newspaper based in South Florida.

== History ==
The paper was established in 1923 by a Bahamian immigrant, Henry E. Sigismund Reeves.

Sigismund Reeves founded the weekly paper, which he printed on a small hand press in his home.

His son, Garth succeeded him as editor and publisher in 1970, and passed the mantle to his daughter and Sigismund's granddaughter, Rachel Janie Reeves in 1994. The current publisher is Rachel's son, and Sigismund's great-grandson, Garth Basil Reeves III.

After becoming publisher in 1994, Rachel instituted changes to the paper's format, a business decision that enabled it to compete with other local papers like the Miami Herald. She also raised the pay of her staff to attract talent. The change from a tabloid to broadsheet is credited with keeping loyal readers and gaining new ones.
