= Sebastian Blanck =

American musician and figurative painter

- Born: July 18, 1976 (age 50); New Haven, Connecticut, U.S.
- Education: Rhode Island School of Design
- Known for: Black Dice (band), Fine art painting
- Style: Figurative painting
- Spouse: Isca Greenfield-Sanders (m. 2003)
- Website: www.sebastianblanck.com

Sebastian Blanck (born July 18, 1976) is an American musician and figurative painter, best known for his work with the band Black Dice and later his paintings.

== Work ==
=== Early life ===
Blanck was born in 1976 in New Haven, Connecticut, to Maggie Land and Dr. Thomas J.J. Blanck, a professor and chairman of the Department of Anesthesiology at New York University Hospital. He received a B.F.A. in painting from the Rhode Island School of Design in 1998. In 2001, he was a visiting artist at the American Academy in Rome. In 2003 Sebastian Blanck married artist Isca Greenfield-Sanders, with family friend Lou Reed officiating the wedding.

=== Music ===
In the late 1990s, he became a founding member of the experimental electronica group Black Dice along with Bjorn Copeland, Hisham Bharoocha and Eric Copeland. Blanck has worked as a composer for short films and documentaries including; Thinking XXX (2004), Ghosts of Grey Gardens (2005), About Face: Supermodels Then and Now (2012) and more. After Blanck left Black Dice to focus on painting, he returned to music, but veered away from his former band's electronic aesthetic. On June 22, 2010, Blanck released an unplugged, folk, solo album called Alibi Coast on Rare Book Room Records.

=== Visual art ===
Blanck is based out of New York City. He has had solo exhibitions at Baldwin Gallery in Aspen Colorado, Bjorn Wetterling Gallery in Stockholm and Werkstatte Gallery in New York. His most recent exhibitions include, "She's My Best Friend", in July-August 2023 at Miles McEnery Gallery in Chelsea, NY and "Halos" in June, 2024 at Dowling Walsh Gallery in Rockland, Maine.
