= Elaine de Kooning House =

Home of Elaine de Kooning in East Hampton, New York

- Elaine de Kooning House and Studio
- U.S. National Register of Historic Places
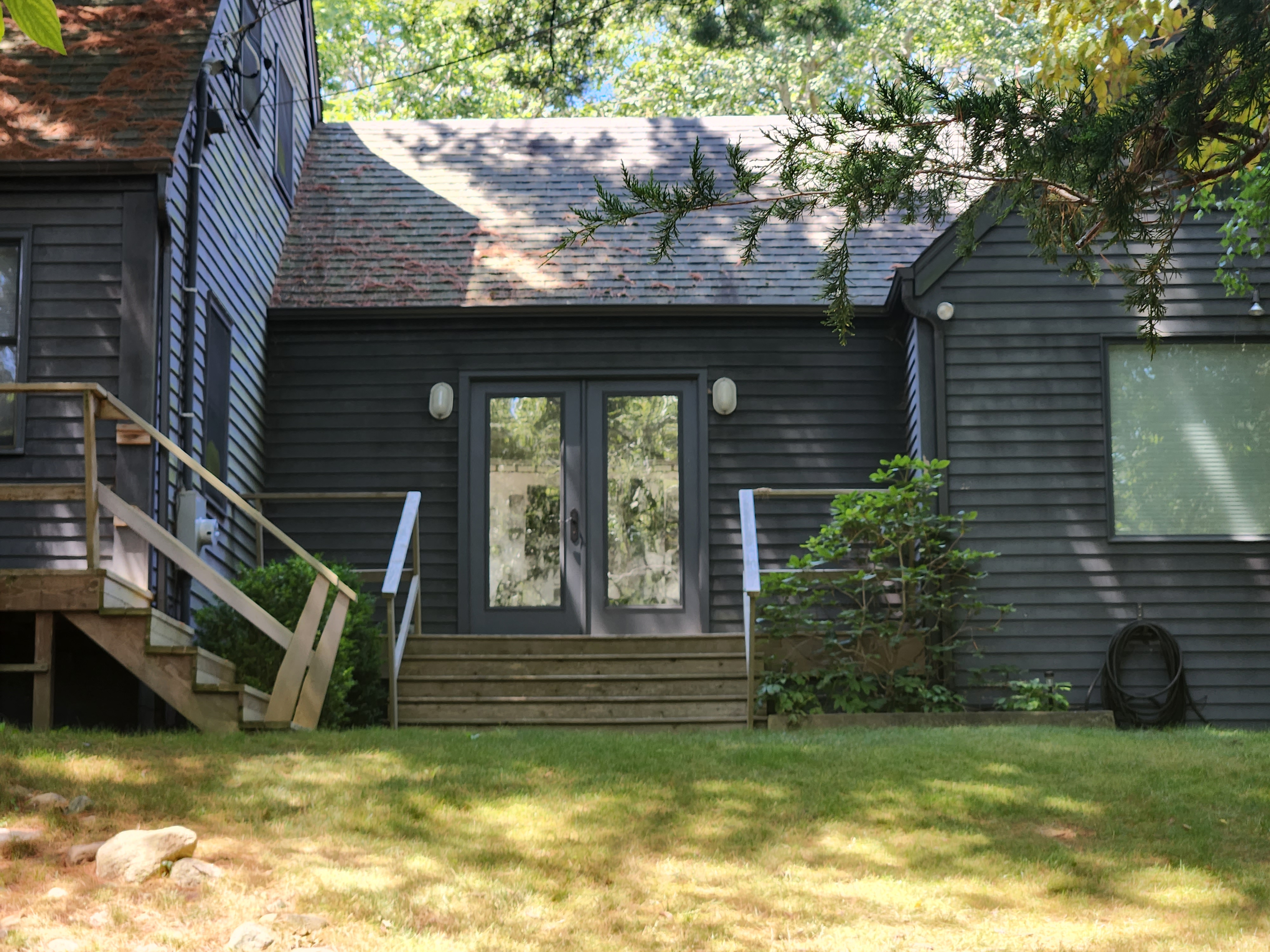
- Elaine de Kooning House and studio.

- Location within New York
- Location: 55 Alewive Brook Rd., East Hampton, New York
- Coordinates: 41°01′16″N 72°13′04″W
- Area: 1.12 acres (0.45 ha)
- NRHP reference No.: 100007372
- Added to NRHP: January 26, 2022

The home and studio of American abstract expressionist artist Elaine de Kooning, at 55 Alewive Brook Road in East Hampton, New York, in the US, is a historic site that was added to the National Register of Historic Places on January 26, 2022. The Elaine de Kooning House is also an affiliate member of Historic Artists' Homes and Studios, a program of the National Trust for Historic Preservation.

== History ==
Elaine de Kooning, a distinguished abstract expressionist artist, inhabited and worked in this space for 14 years until her death in 1989. She produced her final noteworthy series, including the Cave Walls and Cave Paintings, from 1985 to 1988, within the confines of this residence. The nomination documents emphasize that this period saw her experiment with fresh themes and series, her active involvement within the local abstract artist community, and an escalating recognition of her contemporary and earlier contributions to the art world.

The studio and home also hold associations with her commissioned artworks. Here, she immortalized the Brazilian soccer legend Pele in a portrait. De Kooning's artistic prowess extended to notable portrayals of figures like President John F. Kennedy and Allen Ginsberg.

Renowned as an essential figure among the "first generation" of female Abstract Expressionist painters, alongside fellow artists like Perle Fine and Lee Krasner, Elaine de Kooning was also associated with the New York School. Her artistic circle included well-known male contemporaries such as her husband, Willem de Kooning, as well as notable artists like Mark Rothko, Franz Kline, and Jackson Pollock.

== National Registers of Historic Places ==
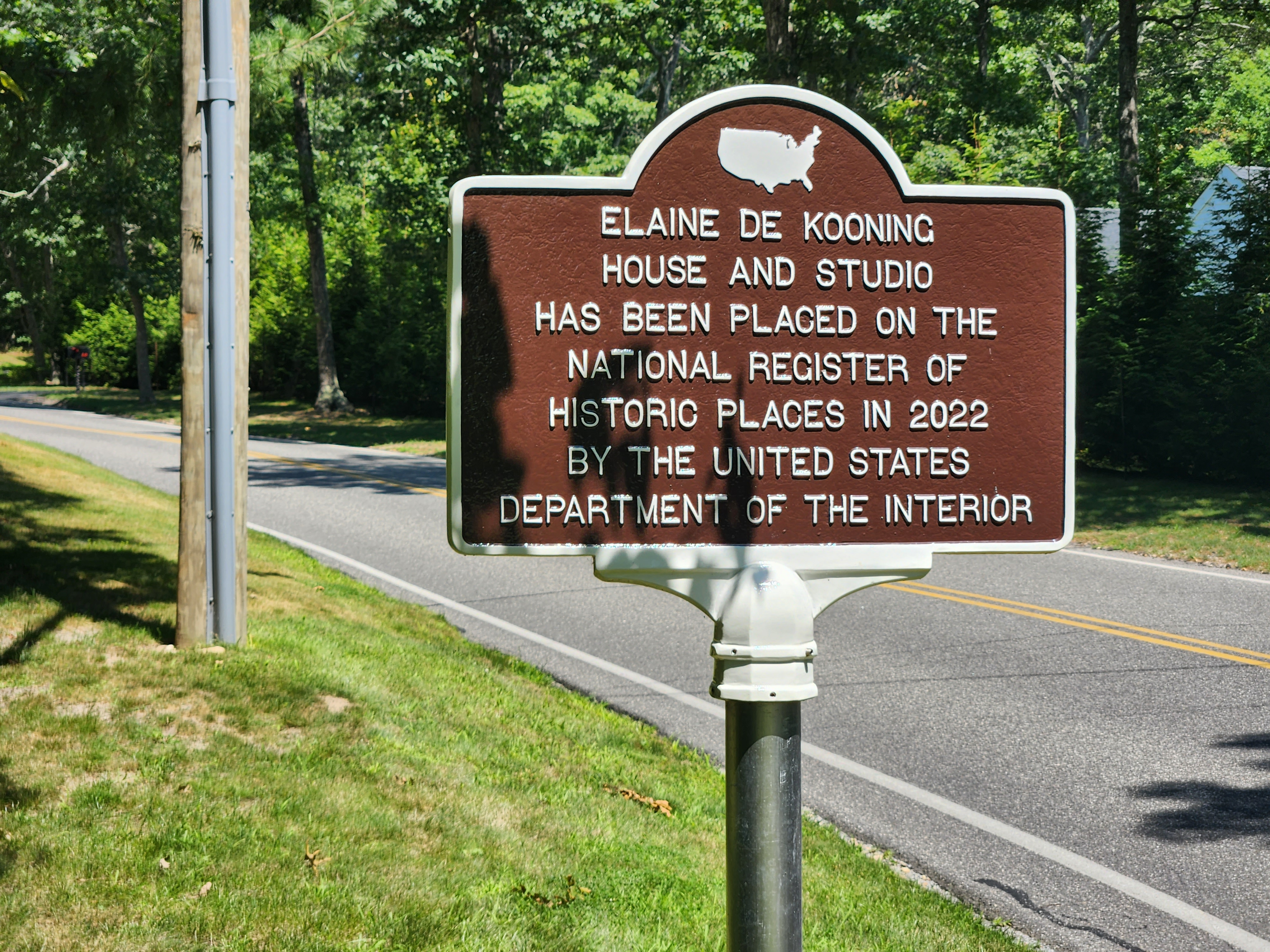
Elaine de Kooning House historic marker.

The listing of this property on both the state and national registers came about in December 2022. Elaine de Kooning secured ownership of the Northwest Woods property in 1975. In 1978, she augmented the site with the addition of her studio. Despite reconciling with Willem de Kooning that same year after a prolonged separation, he maintained his residence in Springs.

The nomination for inclusion on the State and National Registers of Historic Places underscores the impact of her pursuits and her lasting imprint on the artistic landscape of East Hampton.

== Northwest Woods ==
The property spans 1.114 acres and features a sweeping driveway leading to the transformed residence. The main house, constructed in 1968 and later converted by de Kooning into a year-round dwelling, boasts a distinctive design comprising a two-story, side-gabled house linked to a one-and-a-half-story, cross-gabled studio by a one-story, L-shaped connector. An added wooden porch in 1982 artfully binds the house to the studio.

The studio itself, with an open layout, showcases a bedroom, bathroom, living area, and a spacious open studio space. Visual reminders of its use by various resident artists adorn the walls. De Kooning's iconic artist's ladder occupies a prominent place within the studio.

While the property holds a shared history with her husband, Willem de Kooning, as a space of creativity, he primarily inhabited it rather than created art there.

Noteworthy features of the dwelling include open closets, plywood floors, and pocket doors in the bedroom, along with 1970s-style fixtures in the bathroom. The living area is outfitted with a sizable sectional couch, complemented by de Kooning's wooden storage cabinet, specially designed to house her paintings. Her studio space bears her initials, "E de K," emblazoned on its north wall.

The transformative impact of the property on Elaine de Kooning's artistic journey is poignantly highlighted by the New York State's assessment. The alterations and additions made to the building between 1975 and 1978, culminating in the creation of an expansive studio and loft space, enabled her to craft art that gained critical acclaim. This house and studio served not only as a physical space but also as a catalyst for her creative endeavors, leaving an enduring legacy in the annals of art history.

== Legacy ==
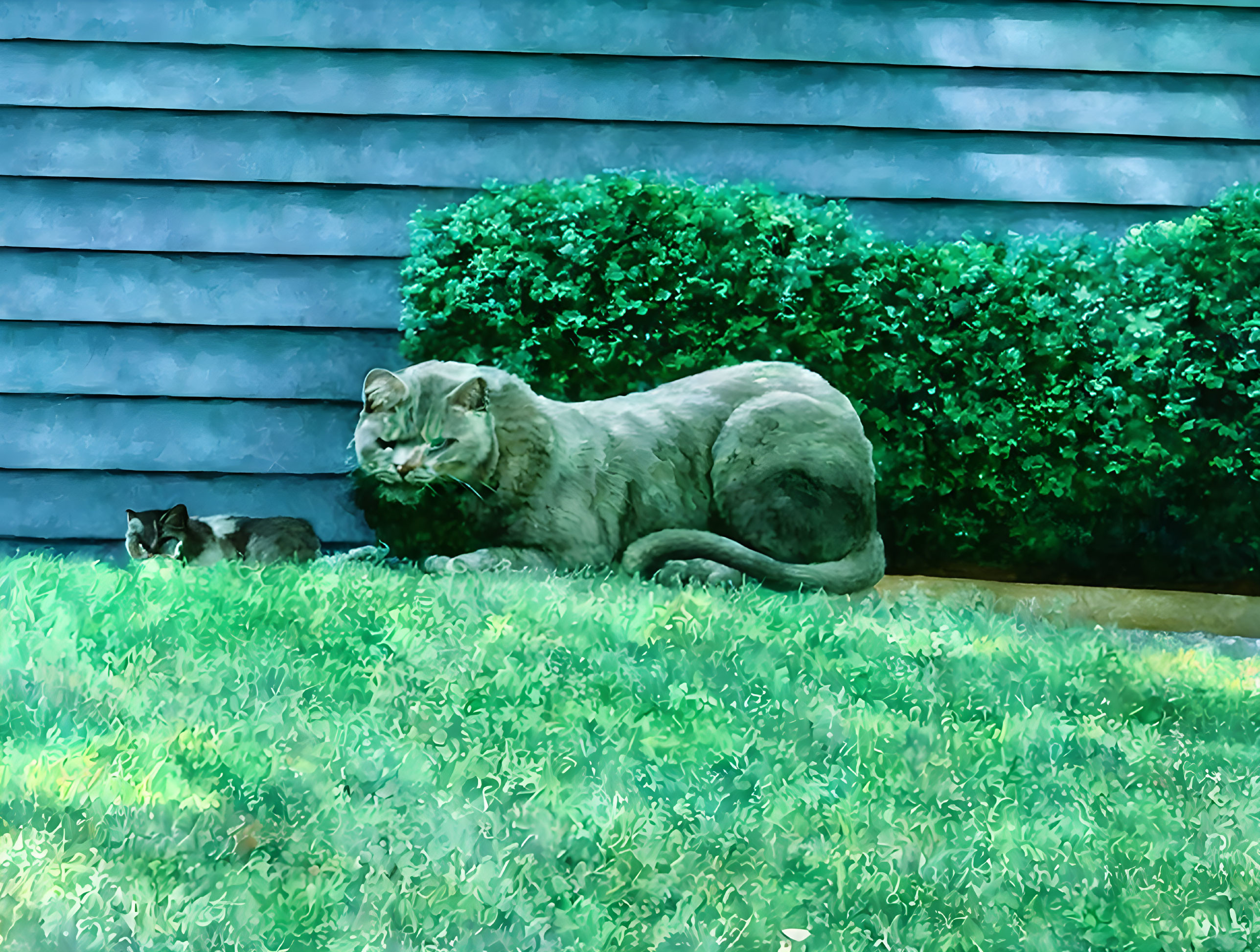
Elaine de Kooning House lawn cat.

Following Elaine de Kooning's passing, the ownership of the house underwent several changes, with notable individuals like sculptor John Chamberlain and painter Richmond Burton taking up residence. Subsequently, the property was acquired by Chris Byrne, who repurposed it as an artist residency.

This historical residence was among the 20 homes in New York State recommended for inclusion in the National Register of Historic Places in 2022.

== See also ==
- Willem de Kooning
- Abstract expressionism
