= John Ashbery (Elaine de Kooning) =

1975 painting by Elaine de Kooning

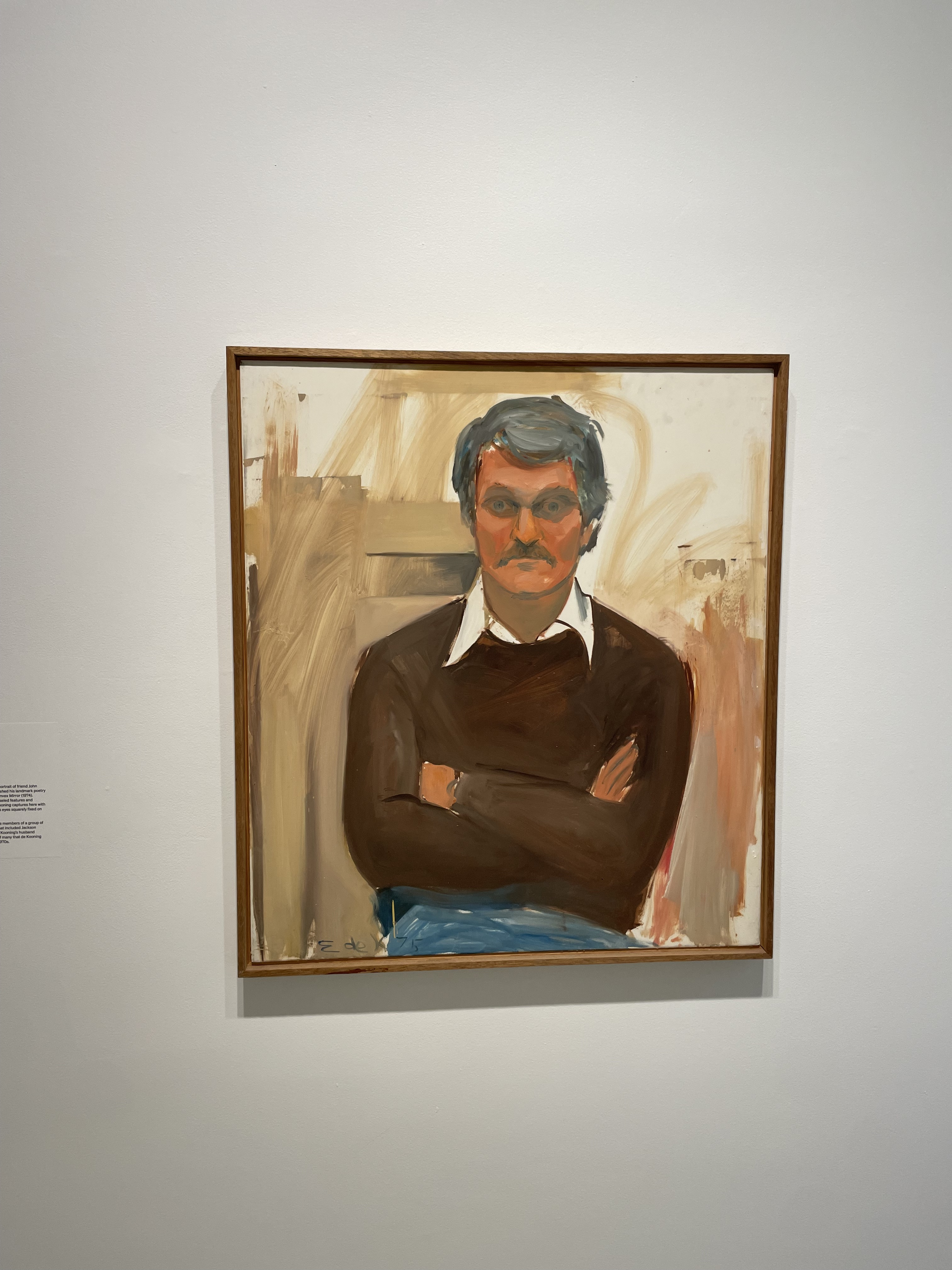
- Artist: Elaine de Kooning
- Year: 1975
- Medium: Oil on canvas
- Dimensions: 86.4 cm × 76.2 cm (34 in × 30 in)
- Location: Memorial Art Gallery, University of Rochester, Rochester
- Accession: 1999.3

John Ashbery is a 1975 oil portrait of John Ashbery by Elaine de Kooning. The painting is located at the Memorial Art Gallery in Rochester, New York. De Kooning also made a lithograph print portrait of Ashbery in 1984 that is also under ownership of the Memorial Art Gallery. Both portraits have been included in exhibitions showcasing work related to John Ashbery's poetry collection, "Self Portrait in a Convex Mirror".

== Description ==
The portrait depicts John Ashbery sitting with his arms crossed and his eyes focused on the viewer. The painting has been compared in style to portraits by Alice Neel in the synthesis of paint and image.

== Background ==
Elaine de Kooning painted many portraits of friends and celebrities. Elaine and her husband Willem de Kooning were associated with many artists and poets in the New York art scene known as the "New York School". Other artists associated with the New York School scene include John Ashbery and Frank O'Hera. Willem was as acquainted with Ashbery as his wife was, with Ashbery referencing Willem in a 1957 poetry review.

The portrait was painted not long after Ashbery published his critically acclaimed poetry collection Self-Portrait in a Convex Mirror in 1974. The publication of his collection was a major milestone in Ashbery's career, with the collection winning him the Pulitzer Prize, the National Book Award and the National Book Critics Circle Award, and all in one year — the first time a writer had achieved such a feat.
