= Elaine de Kooning =

American expressionist painter (1918–1989)

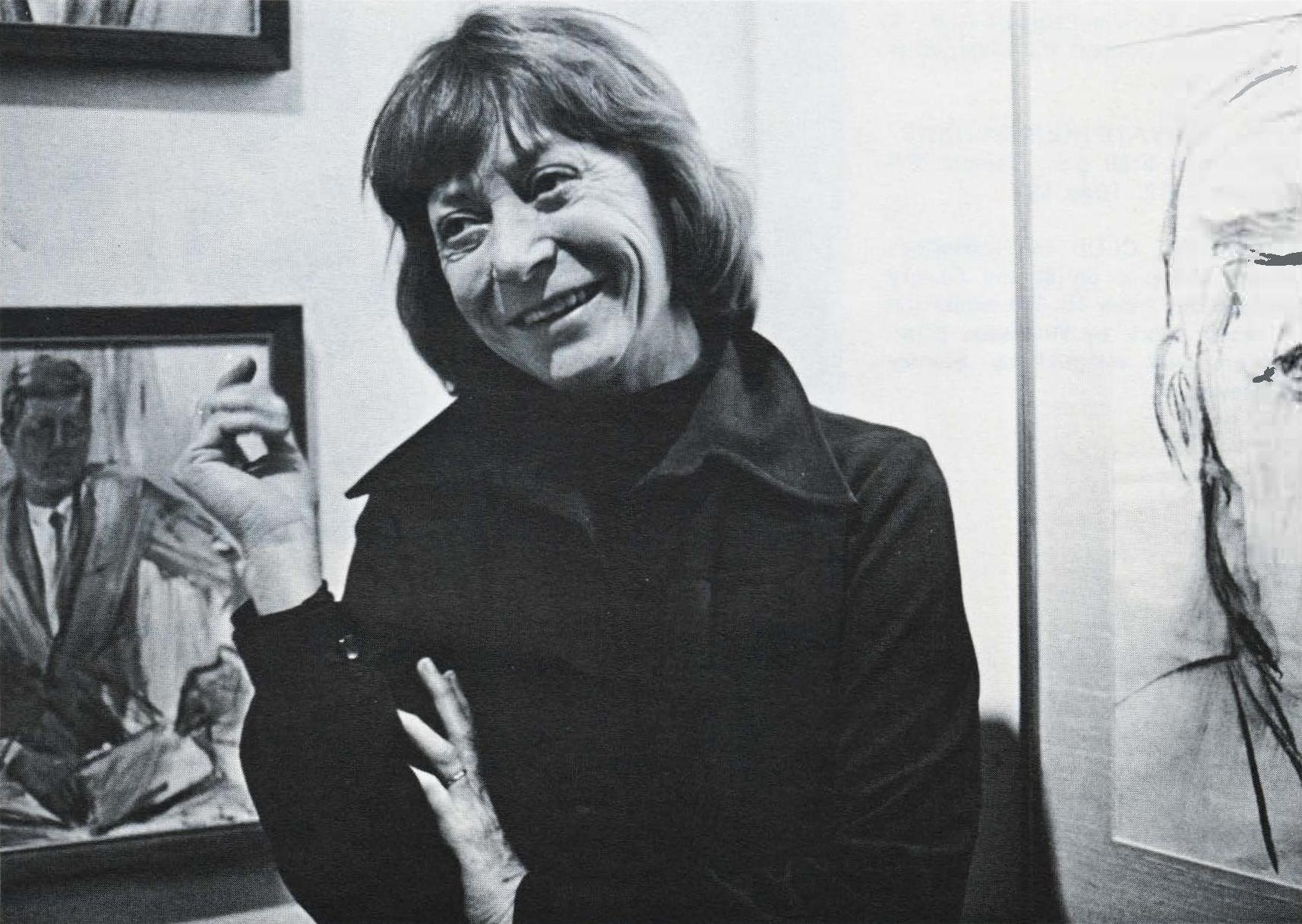
- Elaine de Kooning c. 1974
- Born: Elaine Marie Catherine Fried; March 12, 1918; Brooklyn, New York City, U.S.
- Died: February 1, 1989 (aged 70); Southampton, New York, U.S.
- Known for: Painting
- Movement: Abstract expressionism, American Figurative Expressionism
- Spouse: Willem de Kooning (m. 1943)

Elaine Marie Catherine de Kooning (/də ˈkuːnɪŋ/ də KOO-ning, Dutch: [də ˈkoːnɪŋ]; née Fried; March 12, 1918 – February 1, 1989) was an American painter and art critic. A key contributor to the abstract expressionist and Figurative Expressionist movements, she wrote extensively on the art of the period and was an editorial associate for ARTnews magazine. She was married to Dutch-American artist Willem de Kooning from 1943 until her death in 1989, though they were separated for much of that time.

== Early life and education ==
Elaine de Kooning was born Elaine Marie Catherine Fried on March 12, 1918, in Flatbush, Brooklyn, New York City. Her parents were Mary Ellen O'Brien, an Irish Catholic, and Charles Frank Fried, a Protestant of Jewish descent. Her father Charles was a plant manager for the Bond Bread Company.

Elaine was the eldest of four children; Marjorie (Luyckx), Conrad, and Peter were her siblings. Her mother, despite being recalled as less loving and attentive than some parents by Elaine's younger sister, supported Elaine's artistic endeavors.

Elaine's mother started taking Elaine to museums at the age of five and taught her to draw what she saw. Elaine's childhood room was decorated with painting reproductions. Her mother was committed to the Creedmoor Psychiatric Center for a year during Elaine's childhood after a neighbor reported her for neglect of her children.

== Studies ==
In grade school, Elaine began drawing and selling portraits of children attending her school. She was interested in and did well at sports as well as art. Elaine studied at Erasmus Hall High School in Brooklyn. After graduating from high school, she briefly studied mathematics at Hunter College in New York City, where she befriended a group of abstract and social realist painters. In 1937, she attended the Leonardo da Vinci Art School and went on to study at the American Artists School, both in New York City. While attending school, Elaine made money working as an art school model.

== Marriage to Willem de Kooning ==
In the fall of 1938, her teacher Robert Jonas introduced her to Willem de Kooning at a Manhattan cafeteria when she was 20 and he 34. Elaine had admired his artwork before meeting him. After meeting, Willem began to instruct her in drawing and painting. They painted in his loft at 143 West 21st Street, and he was known for his harsh criticism of her work, "sternly requiring that she draw and redraw a figure or still life and insisting on fine, accurate, clear linear definition supported by precisely modulated shading." He even destroyed many of her drawings, but this "impelled Elaine to strive for both precision and grace in her work". When they married on December 9, 1943, she moved into his loft and they continued sharing studio spaces. Willem had a daughter, Lisa de Kooning, in 1956, as a result of his affair with Joan Ward, an illustrator Willem met at the Cedar Tavern in Greenwich Village, a popular meeting place for New York artists.

Elaine and Willem both struggled with alcoholism, which eventually led to their separation in 1957. While separated, Elaine remained in New York City, struggling with poverty, and Willem moved to Long Island and dealt with depression; both continued painting despite these struggles. Having never divorced, they ultimately reunited in 1976.

== Career ==
Elaine de Kooning was a landscape and portrait artist active in the Abstract Expressionist movement of the mid-twentieth century. She was a member of the Eighth Street Club (the Club) in New York City. The Club functioned as a space to discuss ideas. Among this group of artists were Willem de Kooning, Jimmy Rosati, Giorgio Spaventi, Milton Resnick, Pat Passlof, Earl Kerkam, Ludwig Sander, Angelo Ippolito, Franz Kline, Clyfford Still, and Hans Hofmann. A membership position for a woman was rare at that time.

Elaine promoted Willem's work throughout their relationship. Along with her own work as a painter, she was committed to gaining recognition for her husband's work. Though she was very serious about her own work, she was well-aware that it was often overshadowed by her husband's fame. After showing their work in their 1951 exhibition at the Sidney Janis Gallery, Artists: Man and Wife, which also included fellow New York School painters Jackson Pollock and Lee Krasner, Ben Nicholson and Barbara Hepworth, and Jean Arp and Sophie Taeuber-Arp, Elaine said, "It seemed like a good idea at the time, but later I came to think that it was a bit of a put-down of the women. There was something about the show that sort of attached women-wives- to the real artists". Despite this effect on her own career, Elaine continued to promote her husband.

In 1952, she spent the summer at art dealer Leo Castelli's house at The Hamptons with Willem de Kooning.

In April 1954, Elaine presented her first solo exhibition at the Stable Gallery.

Women were often marginalized in the Abstract Expressionist movement, functioning as objects and accessories to confirm the masculinity of their male counterparts. For that reason, she chose to sign her artworks with her initials rather than her full name, to avoid her paintings' being labeled as feminine in a traditionally masculine movement, and to not be confused with her husband.

Elaine de Kooning was an important writer and teacher of art. She began working at the magazine ARTnews in 1948, and wrote articles about major figures in the art world. She wrote about one hundred articles for Art News magazine. Elaine de Kooning was the first American artist in the 1950s to take on the role of artists' critic. "As an writer, she wrote about culture, art, and new ideas to her generation of artists and readers." Although Elaine was a successful writer, she considered herself a "painter by nature." Elaine de Kooning's art and writing were all devoted to art and humanity.

Over the course of her life, she held teaching posts at many institutions of higher education. In 1957, after Elaine and Willem de Kooning separated, she took on a series of short-term teaching jobs to support herself. She taught at the University of New Mexico; the University of California, Davis; Carnegie Mellon University; Southampton College on Long Island; the Cooper Union and Pratt Institute in New York; Yale University; the Rhode Island School of Design; Bard College; the University of Georgia; and the New York Studio School in Paris. In 1985, she was elected into the National Academy of Design as an Associate member, and became a full academician in 1988.

In 2016, de Kooning was one of twelve female artists featured in the "Women of Abstract Expressionism" exhibition organized by the Denver Art Museum. The purpose of this show was to highlight the unique talents and perspectives of female artists who, as was previously noted, were often dismissed or overshadowed by their male counterparts. The show later traveled to the Mint Museum and the Palm Springs Art Museum.

A painting to me is primarily a verb, not a noun, an event first and only secondarily an image.

— Elaine de Kooning

"For Elaine, everything was always new, never resolved, always being unmade and made, as if it had never been made before. She did not accumulate experience and learn what to expect ... Life was a constant surprise." Being the wife of the famous painter Willem de Kooning, she did not receive real recognition for her own achievement until a few years before she died. Her works are featured in the collections of the Museum of Modern Art, the Metropolitan Museum of Art, and the Solomon R. Guggenheim Museum in New York.

== Art ==
Elaine de Kooning made both abstract and figurative paintings and drawings of still life, cityscapes, and portraits. Her work was influenced by Willem de Kooning and Arshile Gorky. Her earlier work comprised watercolors and still lifes, including fifty watercolor sketches inspired by a statue in the Luxembourg Gardens in Paris. Later in her career, her work fused abstraction with mythology, primitive imagery, and realism. Her gestural style of portraiture is often noted, although her work was mostly figurative and representational, and rarely purely abstract. She produced a diverse body of work over the course of her lifetime, including sculpture, etchings, and work inspired by cave drawings, all in addition to her many paintings. Her work presents a combination between painting and drawing, surface and contour, stroke and line, color and light, transparency and opacity.

When asked about her style she said, "I'm more interested in character than style. Character comes out of the work. Style is applied or imposed on the work. Style can be a prison.

=== Early works ===
Elaine and Willem de Kooning spent the summer of 1948 at Black Mountain College in North Carolina. Elaine studied under Bauhaus artist Josef Albers, architect Buckminster Fuller, and choreographer Merce Cunningham. A regular participant in theatrical performances, Elaine was very involved in the college's social life.

=== Portraits ===
A large portion of Elaine de Kooning's work was in portraiture. In addition to painting many self-portraits throughout the course of her life, her subjects were often fellow artists—usually men—including poets Frank O'Hara, John Ashbery, and Allen Ginsberg; writer Donald Barthelme; art critic Harold Rosenberg; Thomas B. Hess, managing editor of ARTnews; Merce Cunningham; art dealer Leo Castelli; jazz musician Ornette Coleman; Brazilian soccer player Pelé; and painters Joop Sanders, Fairfield Porter, Alex Katz and her husband, Willem de Kooning. Although she worked in a gestural Abstract Expressionist mode, she never abandoned working with the figure ensuring the person's likeness.

In 1944, Elaine met Dutch artist Joop Sanders at a Virgil Thomson concert. They agreed to pose for each other, beginning a lengthy collaboration that produced dozens of portraits. Elaine called hers the "Joop Paintings". After spending a day drawing Sanders, she would work for a week turning the drawings into a painting. In the process, Elaine said she became "hooked" on portraits, through which she melded those aspects she found most intriguing in her subject with elements of herself, according to Mary Gabriel's "Ninth Street Women" (page 138)

Elaine employed a wide range of virtuosic drawing and painting techniques. These included finely detailed pencil drawings (including more free ink drawings), crosshatching, erasure, stumping, and improvisational graphic lines, thin paint and impasto, “thin, dripping washes of bold color…” with many media: pencil, ink, charcoal, gouache, collage, mixed media, oil on paper, canvas and Masonite.

According to Brandon Brame Fortune, "She achieves a sense of distinguishing facial features and captures each subject's presence with sharp, jagged strokes of paint... A drawing of [her brother] Conrad from 1951 presents [his] head and shoulders against a dark background, with a combination of careful lines and darker strokes defining a contemplative figure with great subtlety.”

In regard to her portraiture, Elaine de Kooning wrote, "when I painted my seated men, I saw them as gyroscopes. Portraiture always fascinated me because I love the particular gesture of a particular expression or stance ... Working on the figure, I wanted paint to sweep through as feelings sweep through ..." She studied each person "to find the characteristic pose that would define them." Elaine de Kooning made portraits of men in her life, such as her husband Willem de Kooning and gallery owner Charles Egan, with whom she had an affair while he was representing her husband Willem de Kooning. A great example of this is the series of studies and finished portraits of President John F. Kennedy, which was the most important commission in her career. De Kooning also did a series of men with children, and a series of women after she resumed painting a year after John F. Kennedy's death.

=== New Mexico ===
Starting in the fall of 1958, and ending in the late spring of 1959, Elaine got a teaching appointment as visiting professor at the University of New Mexico. This gave her the opportunity to immerse herself in the characteristic color and space of the Southwestern landscape. She visited Juarez, Mexico where she attended many bullfights. She created a series of painting inspired by the theme with bold and bright colors. She wrote that "the cottonwood trees and aspens had turned an overwhelming gold" and that "New England mountains are so well planted, but the New Mexico mountains seems to move toward you." During her stay she travelled to Santa Fe and visited Georgia O Keeffe. She described her as a "grand old gal" who "looks like a monk and was very witty in a dry sort of way."

She started to experiment with acrylic paint during that period. She made connections with students such as William Conger and became friends with artists Joan Oppenheimer, Connie Fox or Margaret Randall. She also got involved with Robert Mallary, a fellow instructor.

=== Bacchus series ===
Bacchus #3 (1978), National Museum of Women in the Arts, Washington, D.C.

The Bacchus series of paintings and watercolors that Elaine de Kooning generated over seven years began in 1976. She was captivated by a 19th-century sculpture of the Roman god Bacchus, which she saw in the Luxembourg Gardens in Paris. She particularly admired the sculpture’s twisting, dynamic form, which portrays the commotion created by the drunken god and his equally inebriated attendants. It was the first time she ever used acrylic paint.

=== Later works ===
In 1983, Elaine visited the Paleolithic cave paintings of Lascaux in France and Altamira in Spain and produced a series of paintings titled Cave Walls. In Paleolithic art she perceived the roots of Abstract Expressionism. These paintings were shown at the Fischbach Gallery in November 1988, three months before her death.

=== Exhibitions ===
In 1951, De Kooning was included in the 9th Street Art Exhibition.

De Kooning's work has been featured in numerous solo exhibitions as well as in a multitude of group shows in commercial art galleries as well as in major art museums and institutions. The artist's work has received increasing critical acclaim posthumously, resulting in exhibitions such as the major museum show "Elaine De Kooning: Portraits" hosted by the National Portrait Gallery in 2015 in Washington, DC.

== Public collections ==
Works by this artist are in the permanent collections of:

- The Museum of Modern Art, New York, NY
- The Solomon R. Guggenheim Museum, New York, NY
- The Metropolitan Museum of Art, New York, NY
- The Denver Art Museum, Denver, CO
- The National Museum of Women in the Arts, Washington, D.C.
- The Los Angeles County Museum of Art (LACMA), Los Angeles, CA
- The Smithsonian American Art Museum
- The National Portrait Gallery, Washington, D.C. - The Smithsonian Institution's National Portrait Gallery reportedly holds the largest museum collection of portraits by De Kooning.
- Albuquerque Museum, Albuquerque, NM

== Death ==
De Kooning died on February 1, 1989, in Southampton, New York, a year after having a lung removed due to lung cancer.

== Legacy ==
Mary Beth Edelson's Some Living American Women Artists / Last Supper (1972) appropriated Leonardo da Vinci’s The Last Supper, with the heads of notable women artists collaged over the heads of Christ and his apostles. Elaine was among those notable women artists. This image, addressing the role of religious and art historical iconography in the subordination of women, became "one of the most iconic images of the feminist art movement."

In 2015, the Pollock-Krasner House and Study Center hosted "Elaine de Kooning Portrayed," an exhibition dedicated to portraits, likenesses, and reflections on de Kooning by other artists, including her husband Willem as well as Arshile Gorky, Fairfield Porter, Hedda Sterne, Alex Katz, Robert De Niro, Sr., Ray Johnson, Joop Sanders, Paul Harris, and Edvins Strautman.

In 2015-2016, de Kooning’s portraits were the showcased in the National Portrait Gallery’s Elaine de Kooning: Portraits.

In 2016, de Kooning was included in the exhibition Women of Abstract Expressionism at the Denver Art Museum.

In 2017, de Kooning was one of the subjects of the book Ninth Street Women: Lee Krasner, Elaine de Kooning, Grace Hartigan, Joan Mitchell, and Helen Frankenthaler: Five Painters and the Movement That Changed Modern Art by Mary Gabriel.

De Kooning's work was included in the 2021 exhibition Women in Abstraction at the Centre Pompidou.

In 2023, her work was included in the exhibition Action, Gesture, Paint: Women Artists and Global Abstraction 1940-1970 at the Whitechapel Gallery in London.

In 2026, the Berry Campbell Gallery presented Elaine de Kooning (1918-1989). It was the "first major solo presentation of Elaine de Kooning's work since the National Portrait Gallery's 2015-2016 exhibition, Elaine de Kooning: Portraits."

One of the few residences owned by Elaine de Kooning during her lifetime was a studio at Alewive Brook Road in East Hampton. The current owners are reportedly developing an artists' residency/alternative exhibition space referred to as "the Elaine de Kooning house."

== See also ==
- Women in art
- American Figurative Expressionism
- New York Figurative Expressionism
- New York School

== Sources ==
- Curtis, Cathy. Elaine de Kooning. New York: Berry Campbell Gallery, 2026.
- Gabriel, Mary. Ninth Street Women: Lee Krasner, Elaine de Kooning, Grace Hartigan, Joan Mitchell, and Helen Frankenthaler: five painters and the movement that changed modern art. New York: Little, Brown and Company, 2018
- Grace Glueck; "Elaine de Kooning, Artist and Teacher, Dies at 68", New York Times obituary, February 2, 1989
- Paul Schimmel; Judith E Stein; Newport Harbor Art Museum, The Figurative fifties: New York figurative expressionism (Newport Beach, California: Newport Harbor Art Museum; New York: Rizzoli, 1988); ISBN 0-8478-0942-0, ISBN 978-0-8478-0942-4, ISBN 0-917493-12-5, ISBN 978-0-917493-12-6
- Hall, Lee (1993). Elaine and Bill, Portrait of a Marriage: The Lives of Willem and Elaine de Kooning. New York City, NY: HarperCollins Publishing. ISBN 9780060183059.
- Marika Herskovic, American Abstract and Figurative Expressionism: Style Is Timely Art Is Timeless (New York School Press, 2009); ISBN 978-0-9677994-2-1 pp. 72–75
- Marika Herskovic, American Abstract Expressionism of the 1950s An Illustrated Survey, (New York School Press, 2003); ISBN 0-9677994-1-4; pp. 90–93
- Marika Herskovic, New York School Abstract Expressionists Artists Choice by Artists, (New York School Press, 2000); ISBN 0-9677994-0-6; p. 8, 16, 25, 36, 102–105
- The Spirit of Abstract Expressionism Selected Writings; ISBN 0-8076-1337-1
- Edvard Lieber, Willem de Kooning: Reflections in the Studio, (New York, New York, Harry N. Abrams, Inc., 2000); ISBN 0-8109-4560-6
- Huffington Post, "Elaine de Kooning Birthday: 10 Things You Didn't Know About the Great Abstract Expressionist," March 12, 2013
