= Mana-Zucca =

American actress, singer, pianist and composer

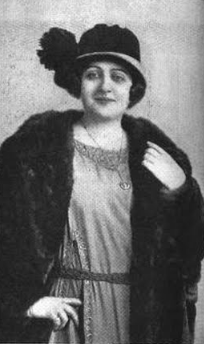
Mana-Zucca 1920

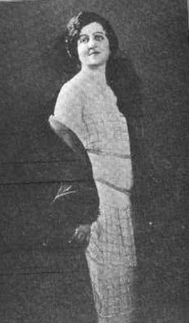
Mana-Zucca 1920

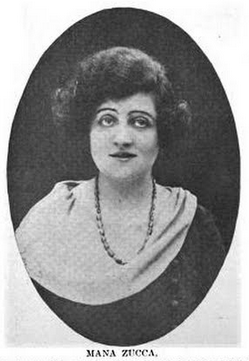
Mana-Zucca, from a 1922 publication

Mana-Zucca (December 25, 1885 – March 8, 1981) was an American actress, singer, pianist and composer.

== Biography ==
Mana-Zucca was born Gussie Zuckermann (first name uncertain) in New York City on December 25, 1885. The daughter of Polish immigrants, she was a child prodigy who began composing at an early age.

Mana-Zucca was interested in music when she was very young. She was frustrated at the age of three when she found that her toy piano didn't have half tones. Her first piano teacher was her neighbor called Patotnikoff. Not long after that, her piano teacher was changed to Platon Brounoff, who was a Russian immigrant. Shortly after giving her first recital at the age of three and a half, she got a scholarship at the age of four when she had an audition for the National Conservatory of Music (New York City). In the conservatory, she studied with different teachers, including Misses Margulies and Okell.

At the age of seven she began to study piano with the eminent Polish pianist and pedagogue Alexander Lambert, who taught at the New York College of Music. Lambert was not only her teacher but also her concert manager and mentor. Her practice regime, dictated by Lambert, was rigorous. So that he could make sure she kept to her schedule, Mana-Zucca lived with Lambert while her career as a child prodigy flourished. The two remained very close friends throughout his lifetime. Lambert suggested that she take the stage name of Augusta, which she used for a while but did not like and later dropped in favor of Mana-Zucca, a rearrangement of her surname.

At the same time that Mana-Zucca studied piano with Lambert, she also studied harmony and composition with Herman Spielter. Her first published work, Moment Musicale for Violin and Piano, was composed when she was only seven years old. Her Etude de Concert was written when she was eight. Her first art song, Frage, was published by Rudolph Schirmer, as were Moment Triste and Moment Orientale, both composed when she was nine.

At the age of eight, she performed as piano soloist in the Beethoven Piano Concerto No. 1 with the New York Symphony Orchestra. In 1914 she made her stage debut with a soprano role in Franz Lehár's The Count of Luxembourg.

As Mana-Zucca approached her early teens, she sailed to Europe with her elder sister Beatrice, better known as Bess. They settled in Berlin, Germany, and she soon became part of that city's busy and exciting cultural milieu. Mana-Zucca's debut in Berlin, at the Bechstein Saal, was highly acclaimed and opened doors for other engagements throughout Europe. Given the opportunity to play with famous Spanish violinist Juan Manén, she performed with him in several successful concerts before signing a contract to play sixty concerts with him over a three-year period; they appeared together throughout Germany and Russia.

While in Berlin, Mana-Zucca studied the works of Brahms with the eminent pedagogue Josef Weiss, and later she was accepted for study in the master classes of the great Ferruccio Busoni, which she attended for eight months. She received private instruction from Leopold Godowsky and also attended master classes that he conducted for selected students. In addition, while in Berlin she studied voice with a Fraülein van Gelder, and later, in London, she studied with Raimond von zur Mühlen, a famous singer of lieder and a much-sought-after voice teacher. Her lively descriptions of Teresa Carreño, Ferruccio Busoni, Leopold Godowsky, and the composition teacher Max Vogrich were published in American music magazines.

Mana-Zucca and her sister stayed in London for several years after leaving Berlin. In England and later in the United States, she was accepted as a singer in several musical comedies, including The Count of Luxembourg, The Rose Maid and The Geisha.

A new phase in Mana-Zucca's life began when she accepted the marriage proposal of Irwin M. Cassel, a gentleman she had known since her youth. The couple eloped on September 21, 1921. Cassel promised his new wife that they would spend seven months of each year in New York City and the remaining five months in Miami, Florida, where he made his home. Cassel supported her musical career and even wrote the lyrics to the then-famous song "I Love Life" (1923), which was performed by celebrated singers such as John Charles Thomas and Lawrence Tibbett. Ultimately, and especially after the birth of her only child, a son named Marwin (a portmanteau of Mana and Irwin) in 1925, Miami became her permanent residence. She spent many happy hours there composing and presenting musicales in her home, "Mazica Hall". She was the teacher of pianist and pioneer Ruth W. Greenfield.

Mana-Zucca had three distinct but interconnected careers:

- As a concert pianist of great renown
- As a singer who performed leading roles in musical comedy, and
- As a prolific composer.

Her brochure of published music totals more than four hundred works. These include music for piano, orchestra, and voice, as well as music for young students.

The University of Miami awarded Mana-Zucca an honorary Doctorate of Music on May 19, 1974.

Mana-Zucca died in Miami on March 8, 1981. Her papers, including copies of her compositions, are in the Mana-Zucca Collection in the Green Library at Florida International University.

== Works ==
Mana-Zucca composed over 1,000 works, including two operas (Hypatia and Queue of Ki-Lu), orchestral works, a ballet, three choral works, more than 20 chamber works and solo works, including the piano concerto Op. 49, a collection of 366 piano pieces called "My Musical Calendar" and the violin concerto Op. 224 for the American violinist Joan Field. The pianist Nanette Kaplan Solomon recorded 17 of the piano works for Albany Records.

Mana-Zucca's best-known compositions are her popular songs, including "There's Joy in My Heart", "Big Brown Bear", "Honey Lamb", "I Love Life" and "Time and Time Again," with the lyrics by her husband, Irwin M. Cassel. In an extensive biographical essay Solomon has noted that "I love life" sums up Mana-Zucca's philosophy.
