= About Face: Supermodels Then and Now =

2012 American documentary film

- Directed by: Timothy Greenfield-Sanders
- Produced by: Timothy Greenfield-Sanders; Chad Thompson
- Release date: 2012
- Running time: 70 minutes
- Country: United States
- Language: English

About Face: Supermodels Then and Now is a 2012 American documentary film directed by photographer and filmmaker Timothy Greenfield-Sanders. The film examines the careers and personal experiences of prominent fashion models, focusing on aging, beauty standards and changes within the fashion industry. It premiered on HBO on July 30, 2012.

== Synopsis ==
The documentary features interviews with former and established fashion models, including Carmen Dell'Orefice, Christie Brinkley, Beverly Johnson, Carol Alt, Jerry Hall, Isabella Rossellini, Paulina Porizkova and China Machado. The film explores the development of the modeling industry from the mid-twentieth century onward, addressing topics such as racial discrimination, cosmetic surgery, aging and the pressures associated with physical appearance through their recollections.

== Reception ==
The documentary received generally favorable reviews. Hank Stuever of The Washington Post praised its personal reflections while criticizing its lack of a consistent thematic focus. Molly Creeden of Vogue described the film as a nostalgic examination of models whose careers spanned several decades.

Allison Keene of The Hollywood Reporter criticized the film for devoting insufficient time to individual interviews, limiting the depth of its examination of the fashion industry.
