= Kyrielle =

The kyrielle is a poetic form that originated in 15th century French troubadour poetry.

== Name and form ==
The name kyrielle derives from the Kýrie, which is part of many Christian liturgies. A traditional kyrielle is written in octosyllabic rhyming couplets, which are typically paired in quatrains. Typically, a kyrielle will use the phrase "Lord, have mercy" or a variation as a refrain as the second line of the couplet or last line of the quatrain. However, some kyrielles use other phrases or words for the refrain. There is no prescribed number of stanzas in a kyrielle, but most have at least three.

There are a number of possible rhyme schemes for a kyrielle, though the refrain is always the final line of each stanza. English kyrielles include Thomas Campion's "With broken heart and contrite sigh" and John Payne's "A lark in the mesh of the tangled vine."
