= Timothy Greenfield-Sanders =

American filmmaker and photographer (born 1952)

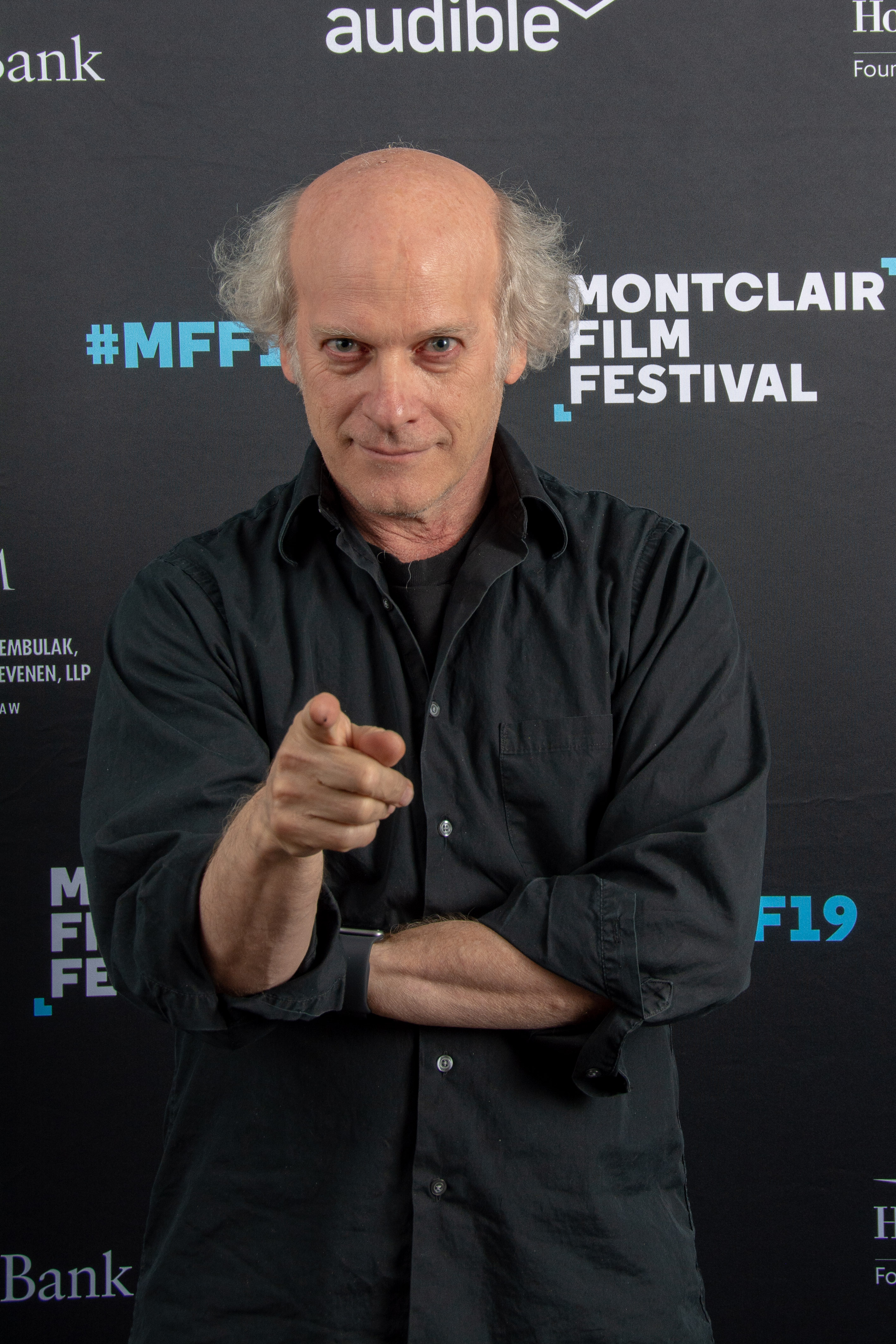
- Greenfield-Sanders in 2019
- Born: Timothy Greenfield; February 16, 1952 (age 74); Miami Beach, Florida, U.S.
- Education: Columbia University (BA); American Film Institute (MFA)
- Known for: Photography, documentary films
- Spouse: Karin Sanders
- Children: 2, including Isca Greenfield-Sanders
- Awards: Grammy Award, NAACP Image Award, Critics Choice Documentary Award, Black Film Critics Circle Award, Sundance Grand Jury Prize
- Website: Greenfield-Sanders.com

Timothy Greenfield-Sanders (born February 16, 1952) is an American documentary filmmaker and portrait photographer based in New York City. The majority of his work is shot in large format.

== Early life ==
Greenfield-Sanders was born in 1952, in Miami Beach, Florida, to musician and teacher Ruth W. Greenfield and lawyer Arnold Merrin Greenfield. He graduated from Ransom Everglades School, and received a BA in art history from Columbia University in 1974 and a MFA in film in 1977 from the American Film Institute (A.F.I). While Columbia in the 1970's had no undergraduate film program, Greenfield-Sanders managed to talk his way into classes at the graduate film school and received academic credit for them. Through his friend, underground actress and singer Tally Brown, he met filmmaker Jack Smith and assisted Smith on projects. His early interest in Alfred Hitchcock increased after taking Andrew Sarris's Hitchcock class at Columbia, and after graduation he worked as the projectionist for Donald Spoto's Hitchcock class at The New School for Social Research.

== Career ==
=== Photography ===
Greenfield-Sanders has photographed well-known figures. The USPS George H.W. Bush "Forever" stamp is based on Greenfield-Sanders' portrait of the former President. 700 of his art world portraits are in the collections of The Museum of Modern Art and The Museum of Fine Arts, Houston. He was on the masthead, as a contributing photographer, of Vanity Fair from 1990 to 2017. He also contributed photos to Barron's and the SoHo Weekly News.

Greenfield-Sanders was initially interested in filmmaking, pursuing a degree at the American Film Institute in Los Angeles, where he also took portraits for the school's archive of visiting directors, actors and film stars. "Because of AFI, I got tips from celebrities as well as access to them," he says. Alfred Hitchcock once remarked, "Young man, your lights are all wrong," while Bette Davis criticized him harshly for "shooting from below", according to a Photofocus.com article. Admitting to Davis that he was eager to learn more about portraiture, she invited him to drive her around Hollywood for a week in exchange for her thoughts on photography. Greenfield-Sanders credits Davis with alerting him to the work of George Hurrell and the art of large-format cameras.

Greenfield-Sanders makes large-format portraiture. He began his career in 1978 using a vintage 1905 Fulmer & Schwing view camera with 11"x14" Ektapan black and white film. He made contact prints from the large-format negatives. Today, with that film discontinued, he shoots with a 1930s Deardorff studio camera on 8"x10" Kodak color negative. He shoots only a handful of frames.

His work has been exhibited in the United States at The National Portrait Gallery, The Newseum, Brooklyn Museum, High Museum of Art, The Museum of Fine Arts, Houston, The San Antonio Museum of Art, and The Annenberg Space for Photography.

=== Film ===
His first documentary film, Lou Reed: Rock and Roll Heart, about the musician Lou Reed, won the 1999 Grammy Award for Best Long Form Music Video. The film premiered in the U.S. at the Sundance Film Festival and in Europe at the Berlin Film Festival. It aired on the American Masters series on PBS.

Greenfield-Sanders exhibited "Thinking XXX", a series of clothed and nude portraits of porn stars, at the Mary Boone Gallery from October 30 to December 18, 2004. During the photo shoots for the exhibition, he directed an HBO documentary, also called Thinking XXX, about the adult stars. His son-in-law Sebastian Blanck worked with him on Thinking XXX as a composer. On October 15, 2004, Greenfield-Sanders was profiled on 60 Minutes. About the XXX project, art critic David Rimanelli in Artforum stated: "Timothy Greenfield-Sanders, the tremendously successful photographer of presidents, Supreme Court justices, movie and music stars, famous writers, and the full panoply of artists, dealers, and critics who constitute the art world, has turned his large-format 8 x 10 Deardorff camera on the parallel universe of pornographic stardom."

Starting in 2008, Greenfield-Sanders directed and produced The Black List, a series of three documentary films. "Volume 1" premiered at The Sundance Film Festival. All three films aired on HBO. Portraits taken by Greenfield-Sanders for the project were first exhibited at the Museum of Fine Arts, Houston, in 2008, then at Brooklyn Museum, the Hartford Atheneum, and the Paley Center in New York City and Los Angeles. From October 27, 2011, to April 22, 2012, all 50 images from the series were shown at The National Portrait Gallery in Washington, D.C. The Black List won an NAACP Image Award for Best Documentary.

In 2010 and 2011, Greenfield-Sanders directed and produced The Latino List: Volumes 1 & 2. Both films aired on HBO. His portraits from the series were exhibited at the Brooklyn Museum of Art and the High Museum in Atlanta. In 2012, he completed another film, About Face: Supermodels Then and Now, an examination of beauty through the eyes and lives of supermodels from the 1950s to the 1980s. This documentary premiered at the Sundance Film Festival and aired on HBO on July 30, 2012. He also directed and produced The Out List, which aired on HBO on June 27, 2013, just as United States v. Windsor was decided. Edith Windsor attended the HBO premiere event in New York.

On September 23, 2014, Greenfield-Sanders aired, on PBS' American Masters series, The Boomer List, which starred well-known persons representing each of the baby boomer years of 1946–1964. His portraits of the 19 subjects were exhibited at the Newseum in Washington, D.C. On September 25, 2015, his film The Women's List aired on PBS' American Master series. His portraits of subjects from the documentary along with 35 other images of women, from his archive, were exhibited through December 31, 2015, at the Hearst Tower Alexey Brodovitch Gallery.

In 2016, Greenfield-Sanders directed and produced The Trans List. Trans journalist and author, Janet Mock, conducted the interviews. The film received grants from The Ford Foundation, The Arcus Foundation and The Annenberg Foundation. Among the eleven subjects were Caitlyn Jenner and Laverne Cox. It aired December 5, 2016, on HBO. In addition to the documentary, Greenfield-Sanders photographed 29 other trans subjects to include in his "list" survey exhibition at the Annenberg Space for Photography. This exhibition was the first time that all 151 portraits from the Black, Latino, Out, Women's and Trans 'list' projects were presented together. On December 4, 2016, Greenfield-Sanders was profiled on CBS Sunday Morning by Serena Altschul.

Greenfield-Sanders' latest film, Toni Morrison: The Pieces I Am, premiered on January 27, 2019, at the Sundance Film Festival. The film explores the extraordinary life and artistry of Toni Morrison, the legendary Nobel laureate. Interviewees include Morrison, Hilton Als, Angela Davis, Fran Lebowitz, Walter Mosley, Sonia Sanchez, and Oprah Winfrey, among others. Toni Morrison: The Pieces I Am won numerous film festival awards, including the 2020 NAACP Image Award for Outstanding Documentary, and was nominated for three Emmy Awards.

== Publications ==
=== Books ===
- After Andy: Soho in the Eighties. Schwartz City, Melbourne, 1996. Text by Paul Taylor, portraits by Greenfield-Sanders.
- Art World. Fotofolio, 1999. Essays by Wayne Koestenbaum, Robert Pincus-Witten, and Mark Strand.
- Timothy Greenfield-Sanders. Alberico Cetti Serbelloni, 2001. Introduction by Francesco Clemente, curated by Demetrio Paparoni. In English and Italian.
- XXX: 30 Porn-Star Portraits. Bulfinch, 2004. Introduction by Gore Vidal.
- Face to Face, Timothy Greenfield-Sanders Selected Portraits 1977-2005. Skira, 2005. Edited by Demetrio Paparoni and Gianni Mercurio.
- Look: Portraits Backstage at Olympus Fashion Week. Powerhouse, 2006.
- The Black List. Atria, 2008. Introduction by Elvis Mitchell, portraits by Greenfield-Sanders.
- The Black List 50. National Portrait Gallery; LCP, 2011. Portraits by Greenfield-Sanders.
- The Latino List. LCP, 2011. Introduction by Maria Hinojosa, portraits by Greenfield-Sanders.
- The Out List. LCP, 2013. Sam McConnell. Portraits by Greenfield-Sanders.
- The Boomer List. LCP, 2015. Portraits by Greenfield-Sanders. Original Book of the Year, Independent Publisher Book Award 2015, SNAP Excel Award 20.
- The Trans List. Janet Mock, 2016. Portraits by Greenfield-Sanders, Annenberg Space for Photography.

=== Catalogues ===
- American Art of the 80's. Electra. Curated by Gabriella Belli and Jerry Saltz, Trento, Palazzo dele Albere, 1991/92 Museo d'Arte Moderna e Contemporanea di Trento e Rovereto.
- Dancers On A Plane: John Cage, Merce Cunningham and Jasper Johns. Portraits by Greenfield-Sanders, essays Susan Sontag, Richard Francis, Mark Rosenthal, Anne Seymour, David Sylvester, and David Vaughan. Thames and Hudson, Anthony d'Offay Gallery London.
- The Last Decade. American Artists of the 80's curated by Collins & Milazzo, essays by Robert Pincus-Witten and Collins and Milazzo photographic portraits of the artists by Greenfield-Sanders. New York: Tony Shafrazi Gallery, 1990.
- Movie Stars. Skira; Museo Carlo Bilotti, Rome, Italy. Essays: Darren Aronofsky & Rachel Weisz, Alec Baldwin Gianni Mercurio, Demetrio Paparoni, Robert Rosenblum, introductions by Silvio Di Francia and Walter Veltroni.
- Timothy Greenfield-Sanders. Marimura Art Museum, Tokyo. Curated by Taro Chiezo, text by Robert Pincus-Witten, 1990.
- Timothy Greenfield-Sanders Portraits. Modern Art Museum of Fort Worth. Essay by Robert Pincus-Witten, 1991.
- Timothy Greenfield-Sanders Selected Portraits 1985-1995. Kunst-Station Sankt Peter, Koln, 1996.
- Timothy Greenfield-Sanders. Emilio Mazzoli Editore. Introduction by Achille Bonito Oliva.
- Faces and Names. Gianni Mercurio. Italian Exhibition catalogue.
- The Ninth Street Show. 1987. Lumiere, Toronto, Canada. Hand printed by Michael Torosian. Text by Robert Pincus-Witten. Edition of 150 copies. Published in 1987 in celebration of 35th anniversary of Leo Castelli Gallery.

== Awards ==
- Grammy Award, 1999, Lou Reed: Rock and Roll Heart.
- NAACP Image Award, The Black List: Volume 1,
- Pratt Institute Legend Award, October 29, 2015, presented by filmmaker, Darren Aronofsky.
- GLAAD Media Award 2016 Nominee Best Documentary.
- Founder's Alumni Award for Distinguished Service to the Community, May 19, 2017, Ransom Everglades
- NAACP Image Award, Toni Morrison: The Pieces I Am,
- News & Documentary Emmy Award, Nominee, Outstanding Arts & Culture Documentary, Toni Morrison: The Pieces I Am
- Critic's Choice Documentary Awards, Winner, Best Biographical Documentary, Toni Morrison: The Pieces I Am

== Collections ==
Greenfield-Sanders' work is held in the following permanent collections:

- The Museum of Modern Art, New York
- The National Portrait Gallery, D.C.
- The Metropolitan Museum of Art, New York
- The Whitney Museum of Art, New York
- The Museum of Fine Arts, Houston
- The Bibliotheque Nationale, Paris
- The Broad Foundation, Los Angeles
- The Brooklyn Museum of Art, New York
- The Corcoran Gallery of Art, Washington, D.C.
- The Detroit Institute of Arts
- Getty Museum of Art, Santa Monica, Ca
- The International Center of Photography
- Museo di Capodimonte, Naples, Italy
- The Museum of Fine Arts, Boston
- The Philadelphia Museum of Art
- The Los Angeles County Museum
- The National Gallery of Art

== One-person exhibitions ==
- 1981: NY Artists of the 50's in the 80's, Marcuse Pfeifer Gallery, New York City,
- 1981: NY Artists of the 50's in the 80's Gallery of Fine Art, Ohio State University, Columbus, Ohio,
- 1981: NY Artists of the 50's in the 80's Loew Gallery, Syracuse, New York,
- 1982: NY Artists of the 50’s in the 80’s Brevard Art Center and Museum, Melbourne, Florida
- 1982: NY Artists of the 50’s in the 80’s Metropolitan Museum and Art Center, Miami, Florida,
- 1982: Art Critics, Marcuse Pfeifer Gallery, New York City,
- 1982: NY Artists of the 50's in the 80's Edwin A. Ulrich Museum of Art, Wichita, Kansas, *1982;
- 1983: NY Artists of the 50's in the 80's Arkansas Art Center, Little Rock, Arkansas,
- 1984: NY Artists of the 50's in the 80's Drew University Gallery, Drew University, Madison, New Jersey, 1984
- 1987: NY Artists of the 50's in the 80's — 9th Street Show, Leo Castelli Gallery, New York City,
- 1987: New Irascibles Series, Marcuse Pfeifer Gallery, NYC, NY.
- 1991: "Timothy Greenfield-Sanders" Modern Art Museum of Fort Worth, Fort Worth, Texas.
- 1996: "Timothy Greenfield-Sanders" Kunst-Station Sankt Peter, Koln, Germany.
- 1999: "Art World" Mary Boone Gallery, NYC, NY
- 2000: "Art World" Emilio Mazzoli Gallery, Modena, Italy
- 2004: "XXX" Mary Boone Gallery, NYC, NY
- 2010: Supermodels of the 70's and 80's, Steven Kasher Gallery, New York,
- 2010: The Black List. (Selected Images) Paley Center, Los Angeles, CA. 2/1/10-5/31/10
- 2011: Injured Soldiers and Marines, Hiram Butler Gallery, Houston, TX,
- 2011: The Black List: Volumes 2 and 3, Rice University, Houston,
- 2011: The Black List: Volumes 2 and 3, Bucknell University,
- 2011: The Latino List: Timothy Greenfield-Sanders, The Brooklyn Museum
- 2011: The Black List: Timothy Greenfield-Sanders, The National Portrait Gallery,
- 2012: About Face Portraits, Paley Center, New York, NY,
- 2013: The Latino List, High Museum of Art, Atlanta, GA,
- 2013: Supermodels, Bernd Kluser Gallery, Munich, Germany,
- 2013: The Out List, Hiram Butler Gallery, Houston, TX,
- 2014–15: The Boomer List, The Newseum, Washington, D.C.,
- 2015: The Women's List, Hearst Tower, New York, NY, 09/21/2015-12/31/15
- 2016: The Boomer List, Washington Pavilion Visual Arts Center – Sioux Falls, SD,
- 2016: The Women's List, Fisher Landau Center for Art, Long Island City, New York, NY
- 2016–17: Identity: Timothy Greenfield-Sanders, The List Portraits, Annenberg Space for Photography, LA, CA,
- 2017–18: The Boomer List, North Carolina Museum of History – Raleigh, NC,
- 2017: The Boomer List, Brattleboro Museum – Brattleboro, VT,
- 2017: The Boomer List, Florida Museum of Photographic Arts – Tampa, FL,
- 2017: The Boomer List, Photographic Center Northwest – Seattle, WA,
- 2017: The Trans List, Wetterling Gallery, Sweden, 2017
- 2018: 50 Women, Southern Vermont Arts Center, Manchester, VT.
- 2018–19: The Latino List, International Museum of Art & Science, McAllen, TX
- 2018: The Trans List, The Dorsky Museum, New Paltz, NY,
- 2018: The Boomer List, The Haggin Museum – Stockton, CA
- 2018: The Boomer List, Morris Museum – Morristown, NJ,
- 2018: "The Boomer List" Springfield Museum of Art – Springfield, OH
- 2018: The Boomer List, The Naper Settlement, Naperville, IL
- 2019: The Boomer List, Museum of the Albemarle – Elizabeth City, NC,
- 2021: The Boomer List, Scarfone/Hartley Gallery at the University of Tampa – Tampa, Fl.,

== Personal life ==
He is married to lawyer Karin Greenfield-Sanders (née Sanders). They have two children: painter Isca Greenfield-Sanders and filmmaker, Liliana Greenfield-Sanders.
