= Slingshot fund =

American Jewish philanthropic organization

Slingshot Fund
- Formation: 2005
- Type: Nonprofit organization
- Purpose: Next-generation Jewish philanthropy; innovation in Jewish life
- Headquarters: New York City, New York, United States
- Website: slingshotfund.org

The Slingshot Fund is an American nonprofit organization that develops next-generation Jewish philanthropists and publishes an annual guide to innovative Jewish nonprofits in North America. Founded in 2005 with support from the Andrea and Charles Bronfman Philanthropies, Slingshot has distributed more than $3 million in grants and featured over 300 organizations across its annual guide.

== History ==
Slingshot was created in 2005 by a group of young funders who had emerged from Grand Street, a next-generation philanthropy network run by 21/64, a division of the Andrea and Charles Bronfman Philanthropies. The group felt that Jewish foundations lacked tools to identify and vet the growing number of innovative, undercapitalized Jewish projects emerging across North America. With support from the Bronfman Philanthropies and the leadership of Sharna Goldseker, the organization was established.

== Programs ==
=== Slingshot Guide ===
The Slingshot Guide is an annual Zagat-style directory of the 50 most innovative nonprofit organizations in North American Jewish life. First published in 2005 by the Andrea and Charles Bronfman Philanthropies, the guide was designed to help next-generation funders and volunteers navigate the Jewish philanthropic landscape. Each listed organization is evaluated on its innovative approach, impact, leadership, and effectiveness. The guide has been published for more than a decade, featuring over 300 organizations across 13 editions. The guide has been described by The Forward as offering a "stamp of recognition" and a "heksher" — a seal of approval — particularly valuable for newer organizations seeking donor credibility. Guide inclusion does not come with direct funding, though listed organizations are eligible to apply for grants through the Slingshot Fund giving circle. Will Schneider, Slingshot's executive director, described the guide as "a resource highlighting the breadth and depth of the Jewish community at this moment, relied upon by doers and donors alike." Of the 50 organizations listed in the 2013 edition, the average founding year was 2005 and the average annual budget was $717,320; women led 52 percent of them.

=== Slingshot Fund ===
The Slingshot Fund is a collective giving circle for Jewish funders in their twenties and thirties. Members pool contributions to make larger grants to innovative Jewish organizations, while gaining exposure to the grant-making process through proposal review, site visits, and allocation decisions. The fund has distributed more than $3 million to innovative Jewish organizations across North America.

=== Slingshot Fellowship ===
The Slingshot Fellowship is a cohort-based leadership development program for young Jewish philanthropists, designed to deepen philanthropic knowledge and build peer networks.

== Notable listed organizations ==
Organizations featured in the Slingshot Guide have included Birthright Israel, MAZON: A Jewish Response to Hunger, Challah for Hunger, and Hazon, among more than 300 organizations featured across the guide's history. The first edition included JDub , a Jewish record label, and Storahtelling, a theatrical troupe that retold biblical stories through avant-garde performance.

== See also ==
- MAZON: A Jewish Response to Hunger
- Challah for Hunger
