= Moment (magazine) =

American magazine

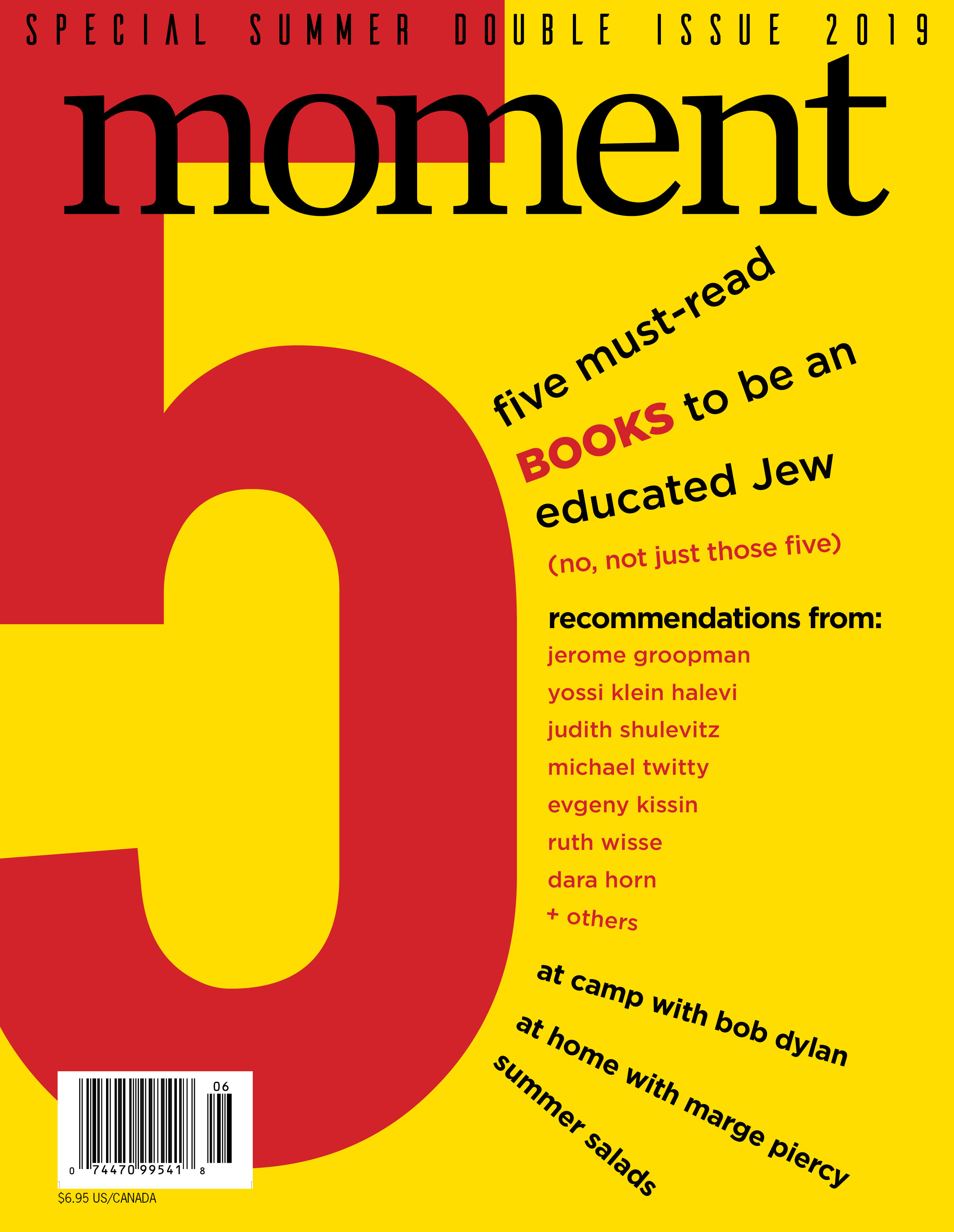
- Summer 2019
- Editor-in-Chief: Nadine Epstein
- Editor: Sarah Breger
- Former editors: Leonard Fein; Hershel Shanks
- Categories: Religion, Politics, Culture
- Frequency: Bi-monthly
- Circulation: 65,000
- Publisher: Nadine Epstein
- Founder: Elie Wiesel; Leonard Fein
- Founded: May 1975
- First issue: 1975
- Company: Center for Creative Change
- Country: United States
- Based in: Washington, D.C.
- Language: English
- Website: momentmag.com
- ISSN: 0099-0280
- OCLC: 610402552

Moment is an independent magazine which focuses on the life of the American Jewish community. It is not tied to any particular Jewish movement or ideology. The publication features investigative stories and cultural criticism, highlighting the thoughts and opinions of diverse scholars, writers, artists and policymakers.

Moment was founded in 1975, by Nobel Prize laureate Elie Wiesel and Jewish activist Leonard Fein, who served as the magazine's first editor from 1975 to 1987. In its premier issue, Fein wrote that the magazine would include diverse opinions "of no single ideological position, save of course, for a commitment to Jewish life." Hershel Shanks served as the editor from 1987 to 2004. In 2004, Nadine Epstein took over as editor and executive publisher of Moment.

The magazine was named in honor of an independent Yiddish-language newspaper, entitled Der Moment. Founded in Warsaw in 1910, Der Moment remained in operation until the eve of Yom Kippur 1939, when the building housing the newspaper was destroyed by a German bomb. At the time, the publication was one of two Yiddish-language newspapers in the city.

Moment magazine is an independent journal that publishes articles on Jewish culture, politics, and religion. Its editorial staff, writers, and articles represent a diverse range of political views. Moment publishes a print magazine once every other month, maintains a website, runs literary contests, and hosts events. The magazine is a publishing project of the Washington, D.C.–based Center for Creative Change.

Moment's recent stable of contributors include fiction writer Naomi Ragen; academics Fania Oz-Salzberger and Marshall Breger; journalists Shmuel Rosner, Gershom Gorenberg, Amy E. Schwartz and Emmy Award winner Letty Cottin Pogrebin; and critics Robert Siegel and Carlin Romano. Past contributors have included Calvin Trillin, Chaim Potok, Isaac Bashevis Singer, Abba Eban, Cynthia Ozick, Wolf Blitzer, Yossi Klein Halevi, Theodore Bikel, Jerome Groopman, Ron Rosenbaum, Sherwin Nuland, Erica Jong, Dara Horn, David Margolick, and Rebecca Goldstein.

== Programs and contests ==
=== Anti-Semitism Monitor ===
In 2018, Moment launched an Anti-Semitism Monitor to select, catalog and report credible antisemitic incidents around the world on a weekly basis. Developed and curated by Ira Forman, a Moment Institute Fellow and the former U.S. Special Envoy of the Office to Monitor and Combat Anti-Semitism, Moment's Anti-Semitism Monitor is a way for experts and others to track antisemitic incidents by date and country as well as the reactions to those incidents.

=== Daniel Pearl Investigative Journalism Initiative ===
In 2010, Moment launched the Daniel Pearl Investigative Journalism Initiative (DPIJI), which gives grants to young journalists doing stories on modern antisemitism and other forms of prejudice. The DPIJI is in memory of Daniel Pearl, the Wall Street Journal reporter, who was murdered by terrorists while on assignment in Pakistan in 2002. The winners of this contest are mentored by prestigious journalists including: Wolf Blitzer, Linda Feldmann, Martin Fletcher, Glenn Frankel, Bill Kovach, David Lauter, Charles Lewis, Clarence Page, Robert Siegel, Paul Steiger and Lynn Sweet. Fellows have included: Jacob Kushner whose story "Birthright Denied" explored the Dominican Republic's efforts to take away citizenship from tens of thousands of Haitians who were born in the country; Eve Fairbanks, whose story "A House Divided" tells the story of the integration and subsequent re-segregation of the dorms at the University of the Free State in Bloemfontein; Emily K. Alhadeff, whose story "An Olympian Struggle," explores the complex story of anti-Israel campaigns in Olympia, Washington; Cameron Conaway, whose story "Shadows in the Golden Land" tells the story of the failure of the newly-democratic Myanmar to end the persecution of the country's Muslim minority; May Jeong, whose story "Strangers in Their Own Land" covered the Buddhist Nationalist attacks on Muslim neighbors in Sri Lanka; Taha Anis, whose article "Persecuted in Pakistan" explored the discrimination and arrests of the Ahmadiyya sect of Islam in Pakistan.

=== The Karma Foundation-Moment Magazine Fiction Contest ===
Established in 2000, the annual Moment Magazine-Karma Foundation Short Fiction Contest is open to writers to submit stories related to Judaism or Jewish culture or history. Judges have included Andre Aciman, Walter Mosley, Nicole Krauss, Erica Jong, Jonathan Safran Foer, Geraldine Brooks, Dara Horn and Nicholas Delbanco.

=== Moment Cartoon Caption Contest ===
Moment's bi-monthly caption contest for cartoons was founded by former New Yorker editor and humorist Bob Mankoff. The magazine asks its readers to suggest captions for the cartoon online and vote for their favorite submission.

=== Moment Magazine Awards ===
Over the years, Moment has presented a range of artists, journalists, and public activists with Moment Magazine Awards for excellence in their field. The awards include Creativity Awards, the Robert S. Greenberger Journalism Award, the Lifetime Achievement Award, the Outstanding Leadership Award, etc. In 2018, Moment honored Ruth Bader Ginsburg as the Human Rights Award inaugural recipient and presented Creativity Awards to Dana Bash, CNN's chief political reporter, and American abstract artist, Carol Brown Goldberg. In 2017, CNN anchor Jake Tapper won the Robert S. Greenberger Journalism Award for his work as chief Washington correspondent. Earlier winners include Joan Nathan, Peter Yarrow, Wolf Blitzer, and Steven Pinker.

== Awards ==
In 2023, Moment won 15 Rockower Awards. In 2022, the magazine won 20 Rockower Awards and three Religion News Association Awards. In 2021, Moment won one RNA Award and 15 Rockower Awards, including first place for best magazine.

Moment had two stories out of four finalists for the 2018 Mirror Awards in the Best Single Article/Story, for "Sheldon Adelson: Playing to Win" by Nadine Epstein and Wesley G. Pippert, and "Report From Whitefish: After the Cyber Storm" by Ellen Wexler. Moment won two 2018 Simon Rockower Awards from the American Jewish Press Association: Ellen Wexler's "A letter from New Haven" won for Excellence in Social Justice Reporting, and "Growing Up Trump" by Marc Fisher won for Excellence in Feature Writing, Division D. Moment also won a 2018 David Frank Award for Excellence in Personality Profiles, from the American Jewish Press Association, for "No Patience for Patriarchy", by Eetta Prince-Gibson.

In 2017, Moment won in two categories of the American Jewish Press Association Simon Rockower Awards Competition for Excellence in Jewish Journalism. The Curious Case of Dorothy L. Sayers & the Jew Who Wasn't. There by Amy Schwartz won the 2nd Place Award for Excellence in Arts and Criticism News and Features, and Is Sitting This One Out, Who Will be Israel's Champion? and The True Value of Cheap Books by Shmuel Rosner won the 2nd Place Louis Rapoport Award for Excellence in Commentary. Moment won two Religion Newswriters Association awards in 2017. Nadine Epstein was also a finalist for the 2016 Food Writing Award from the International Association of Culinary Professionals for her story The Great Hanukkah Clanging.

Moment has also won several non-Jewish journalism awards, such as nominations for two Livingston Awards, the award for Best Investigative News Story from New American Media; and the 2015 Clarion Award from the Association of Women in Communications for Best Feature Article/Current News for Eetta Prince-Gibson's An Uneasy Union. Moment also won the 2015 first place award in magazine news reporting from the Religion Newswriters Association for Prince's An Uneasy Union, along with awards for Nadine Epstein's Evolution of a Moderate on Mohammed Dajani, and for Michael Orbach's story Professor of Disbelief on James Kugel.

In 2013, Moment won Second Place for the Religion Newswriters Association Magazine of the Year award. In 2012, Moment won their Overall Excellence in Religion Coverage Award for magazines.

== Symposia ==
Moment’s print symposia explore pressing and timely questions from a wide range of perspectives. Each Moment symposium includes interviews with a variety of creative thinkers and doers in order to present a spectrum of nuanced opinion on a broad range of questions important to public discourse. Notable symposia include:

- What is the Meaning of God Today? Moment asks a diverse group of philosophers, scientists, writers, artists, and clergy this age-old question. Featuring responses from Reza Aslan, Brian Greene, and Stephen Tobolowsky.
- Is Democracy Broken? Moment asks an array of scholars, journalists, and activists from the U.S. and abroad to weigh in. Featuring responses from Gloria Steinem, Tracy Kidder, Larry Diamond, and Azar Nafisi.
- Is There a "Jewish" Way to Parent? Moment speaks with a range of Jewish parents and experts to explore what role, if any, Judaism plays in 21st-century parenting. Including responses from Ron Lieber, Ruth K. Westheimer (Dr. Ruth), Ayelet Waldman, and Shalom Auslander.
- Is There a Secret Ingredient in the Jewish Relationship with Food? Including responses from Claudia Roden, Yotam Ottolenghi, Mimi Sheraton, and Ruth Reichl.

== Moment Books ==
In April 2019, Moment launched MomentBooks as a joint imprint with Mandel Vilar Press. Its first title, Elie Wiesel: An Extraordinary Life and Legacy, was published on April 2, 2019, and featured a foreword by Rabbi Jonathan Sacks and an afterword by Ted Koppel. In 2019 it released: Have I Got a Cartoon for You!: The Moment Magazine Book of Jewish Cartoons by Bob Mankoff, which released on September 15, 2019, and City of Light by Theodore Bikel with Aimee Ginsburg Bikel, released on November 4, 2019. In 2020, MomentBooks published Can Robots be Jewish?, edited by Amy E. Schwarz. In 2021, RBG's Brave and Brilliant Women was released, written by Nadine Epstein in collaboration with Ruth Bader Ginsburg.
