= Leonard Fein =

American activist, writer and teacher

- Born: July 1, 1934; Brooklyn, New York, United States
- Died: August 14, 2014 (aged 80); Manhattan, New York, United States
- Occupations: Writer, professor, publisher

Leonard J. Fein (July 1, 1934 – August 14, 2014), also known as Leibel Fein, was an American activist, writer, and teacher specializing in Jewish social themes.

== Early life and education ==
Fein was born to a Jewish family in Brooklyn, New York in 1934. His father, Isaac Fein, was a professor of Jewish history at Baltimore Hebrew College.

After studying at the University of Chicago, Fein later received his PhD from Michigan State University.

== Academic career ==
Fein taught Political Science at MIT in the 1960s. He was then also the Deputy Director of the MIT/Harvard Joint Center for Urban Studies. He joined the Brandeis University faculty in 1970 as a Professor of Politics and Social Policy and the Klutznick Professor of Contemporary Jewish Studies.

== Jewish community leader ==
Fein founded the National Jewish Coalition for Literacy. In 1975, Fein was the co-founder, with Nobel laureate Elie Wiesel, of Moment Magazine, and served as its editor-in-chief for 12 years. He was characterized by Daniel Sokatch of the New Israel Fund as "the father of our Jewish social justice movement."

Fein helped establish Americans for Peace Now in 1981. He was the founder of MAZON: A Jewish Response to Hunger, a hunger relief organization he started in 1985.

== Author ==
He was the author of four books and the editor of two, and he wrote extensively for newspapers, magazines, and journals. From 1990, he wrote a syndicated weekly opinion column for The Forward newspaper.

Fein's books include Where Are We? The Inner Life of America’s Jews and Israel: Politics and People. He was a contributor to The New York Times, The New Republic, Commentary, Commonweal, The Nation, Dissent, and the Los Angeles Times.

== Family ==
He was the brother of Rashi Fein, Litt. D., Ph.D., a famed health economist termed "a father of Medicare" and Professor of Economics of Medicine, Emeritus, in the Department of Global Health and Social Medicine at Harvard Medical School.

He was married twice and had three daughters, Rachel, Nomi, and Jessie.

== Death ==
Fein died at the age of 80.

== Awards ==
- Ameinu Dreamers and Builders Award, November 2009.
- Honorary doctorate from the Hebrew Union College, 1991
- National Foundation for Jewish Culture award for achievement in Jewish scholarship, 1994.
- Jewish Council on Public Affairs, Chernin Award for lifetime contributions to social justice, 1999.
- University of Chicago Alumni Award for "creative leadership in public service that has benefited society and reflected credit on the University", 2000.
