= Rashi Fein =

American economist

- Born: February 6, 1926; The Bronx, New York
- Died: September 8, 2014 (aged 88); Massachusetts General Hospital, Boston, Massachusetts
- Resting place: Lindwood Memorial Park, 497 North Street, Randolph, MA
- Spouse: Ruth (Breslau) Fein

Academic background
- Education: Johns Hopkins University, Harvard University

Academic work
- Discipline: health economics
- School or tradition: providential government
- Institutions: Harvard Medical School
- Notable ideas: 'a father of Medicare'; founding member, Institute of Medicine (IOM); Founding Member, National Academy of Social Insurance
- Awards: Traveling Fellowship, World Health Organization, 1971; John M. Russell Medal, Markle Scholars, 1971; Martin E. Rehfuss Medal and Lectureship; Johns Hopkins University Alumni Association Award, 1999; Lifetime Achievement Award "For Fearlessly Promoting the Rights of All to Health Care", Health Care, 2000; Adam Yarmolinsky Medal, Institute of Medicine, 2000; Debs-Thomas-Bernstein Awards, 2009

Rashi Fein (February 6, 1926 – September 8, 2014) was an American health economist termed "a father of Medicare" in the United States and "an architect of Medicare", was professor of economics of medicine, emeritus, in the department of global health and social medicine at Harvard Medical School, and the author of the book Medical Care, Medical Costs: The Search for a Health Insurance Policy (Harvard University Press, 1986, 1989).

His work has included benefit-cost analysis, health care financing, health care workforce policy, health equity, cost containment, the financing of medical education, and health care reform.

He was the brother of Leonard J. Fein, also known as Leibel Fein, an American activist and writer, who had taught political science at MIT, became deputy director of the Harvard–MIT Joint Center for Urban Studies, and specialized in Jewish social themes.

Fein served on the Advisory Committee of the Jewish Alliance for Law and Social Action He died of melanoma at Massachusetts General Hospital, in Boston.

== Career ==
He began his service to the United States during World War II in the US Navy. He spent much of his time after that thinking and writing about health care reform. He was a member of the Truman Commission on the Health Care Needs of the Nation, which, as early as 1952, had supported national health insurance and the regionalization of health care delivery. Later, he served on President John F. Kennedy's Council of Economic Advisors as a senior staff member (1961–1963). There, he helped to develop the initial legislation for Medicare, a healthcare model that he continued to advocate throughout his life. Fein had also served on the Board of the Committee for National Health Insurance, under the leadership of former United Auto Workers President Douglas Fraser and under Walter Reuther on a board investigating malnutrition in the United States. He was a charter member of the Institute of Medicine (IOM), had received numerous honors for service in medical economics, and sat on boards of a number of not-for-profit health care institutions. He had authored nine books, the most recent of which was Lessons Learned: Medicine, Economics and Public Policy, published in November 2009.

He joined the Harvard faculty of the school of medicine and the John F. Kennedy School of Government in 1968. He also served as senior fellow in the economics program at the Brookings Institution in Washington, D.C.

His 1982 paper "What Is Wrong with the Language of Medicine?" in the New England Journal of Medicine began:

A new language is infecting the culture of American medicine. It is the language of the marketplace, of the tradesman, and of the cost accountant. It is a language that depersonalizes both patients and physicians and describes medical care as just another commodity. It is a language that is dangerous.

It concluded:

A decent medical-care system that helps all the people cannot be built without the language of equity and care. If this language is permitted to die and is completely replaced by the language of efficiency and cost control, all of us — including physicians — will lose something precious.

He served as chair of the National Advisory Committee (NAC) for the Robert Wood Johnson Foundation's Scholars in Health Policy Research Program from 1994 to 2002 and was its Chair Emeritus until his death. His work included benefit-cost analysis, health care financing, health care workforce policy, cost containment, the financing of medical education, and health care reform. His first book was Economics of Mental Illness (1958). His last (2010) book, Lessons Learned: Medicine, Economics and Public Policy, was built on the various lessons and stories that, as Chair of the NAC, he had presented over the years at the Scholars' Annual Meeting in Aspen.

As an invited speaker, he presented his soon-to-be-published book at the "Health Care Reform 2009: Politics and Paranoia" in Boston on October 21, 2009, sponsored by the Boston Democratic Socialists of America and Mass-Care.

Among colleagues, Fein was admired for his wry, often-humorous anecdotes drawn from Jewish culture and over 50 years of experience in the policy arena, which he brought together in his final book, Learning Lessons: Medicine, Economics, and Public Policy (Transaction Publishers, 2010).

He also had served as a Director at Newbridge on the Charles, a senior living facility, an affiliate of the Harvard Medical School.

== Achievements ==
=== Education ===
- B.A., Johns Hopkins University, Baltimore, MD (1948)
- Ph.D. (political economy), Johns Hopkins University, Baltimore, MD (1956)
- M.A., Harvard University (1976)
- (Hon) D.Litt., State University of New York (1996)

=== Professional and academic career ===
- Staff, President Harry S. Truman's Commission on the Health Needs of the Nation, 1952
- Lecturer to associate professor, Economics Department, University of North Carolina, Chapel Hill, 1952–1961
- Project Director, Economics of Mental Illness, Joint Commission on Mental Illness and Health, Cambridge, Massachusetts, 1957–1958
- Statistician, U.S. Bureau of the Census, Suitland, Maryland, 1958–1959
- Senior Staff, President John F. Kennedy's Council of Economic Advisors, 1961–1963
- Senior Fellow, Economics Study Program, The Brookings Institution, 1963–1968
- Professor of Economics of Medicine, Department of Social Medicine, Harvard Medical School, 1968–1999
- Professor of Economics of Medicine, Harvard Kennedy School of Government, 1968–1999
- Professor of Economics of Medicine Emeritus, Department of Social Medicine, Harvard Medical School, 1995–2014

== Recognitions and awards ==
- Charter (founding) member of the Institute of Medicine (IOM), a nonprofit NGO founded in 1970.
- Founding member, National Academy of Social Insurance
- Mumerous honors for his writings in medical economics
- Traveling Fellowship, World Health Organization, 1971
- John M. Russell Medal, Markle Scholars (Markle Fund) for "Advancement of Knowledge in Medicine", 1971
- Martin E. Rehfuss Medal and Lectureship "For Distinguished Service to Medicine"
- Theobald Smith Lectureship, Albany Medical College, "For Teaching", Albany, NY, 1976
- Heath Clark Lecturer, London School of Hygiene and Tropical Medicine, 1980, delivered paper "Social and economic attitudes shaping American health policy" on March 24 and 26, 1980
- Johns Hopkins University Alumni Association, 1999
- Lifetime Achievement Award "For Fearlessly Promoting the Rights of All to Health Care", Health Care, 2000
- Adam Yarmolinsky Medal from the Institute of Medicine, 2000
- On June 30, 2009, he received the Debs-Thomas-Bernstein Awards, sponsored by Boston Democratic Socialists of America, in Boston.

== Publications ==
- Economics of Mental Illness, Basic Books, 1958.
- The Doctor Shortage: An Economic Diagnosis, The Brookings Institution, 1967.
- Financing Medical Education: An Analysis of Alternative Policies and Mechanisms (with Gerald I. Weber), McGraw Hill, 1971.
- A Right to Health: The Problem of Access to Primary Medical Care (with Charles Lewis and David Mechanic), John Wiley & Sons, 1976.
- Employment Impacts of Health Policy Developments (with Christine Bishop), Special Report No.11, National Commission for Manpower Policy, 1976.
- Alcohol in America: The Price We Pay. California: Care Institute, 1984.
- Medical Care, Medical Costs: The Search for a Health Insurance Policy, Harvard University Press, 1986, 1989.
- The Health Care Mess: How We Got Into It and What It Will Take To Get Out (with Julius B. Richmond), Harvard University Press, 2005.
- Learning Lessons: Medicine, Economics, and Public Policy, Transaction Publishers, 2010.

== See also ==
- Social Security Administration
