= Winston Price =

American scientist

- Born: 1923; New York City, U.S.
- Died: April 30, 1981 (aged 57–58); Baltimore, Maryland, U.S.
- Education: University of Pennsylvania; Princeton University
- Known for: Isolating first rhinovirus (1953); Studies on rickettsia
- Spouse: Grace Hartigan (m. 1960)
- Awards: Theobald Smith Award (1954); Howard Taylor Ricketts award (1963)
- Scientific career
- Fields: Epidemiology; Virology; Immunology; Vaccinology
- Workplaces: Johns Hopkins University; Rockefeller Institute of Medical Research

Winston Harvey Price (1923 – April 30, 1981) was an American scientist and professor of epidemiology with a special interest in infectious diseases, who made media headlines in 1957, when he reported details of a vaccine for the common cold after isolating the first rhinovirus. He was acknowledged by the director of the Public Health Research Institute at the time. However, other specialists in the field of vaccine research have disputed his methods and data.

Earlier in his career, he had detailed how ticks of the genus Dermacentor were the main vectors of Rickettsia rickettsii that caused Rocky mountain spotted fever in humans.

== Early life and education ==
Price was born in New York City in 1923. He had one older brother, Ira, and his father was a wealthy physician. According to the 1925 New York State Census, his mother was Canadian-born Florence, who had emigrated to the United States. His family lived at 1565 Grand Concourse in the Bronx.

In 1942 he earned a B.A. in biology and chemistry from the University of Pennsylvania and in 1949, M.S. and Ph.D. degrees in physiology and biochemistry from Princeton. He was inspired by Sinclair Lewis's novel Arrowsmith.

== Career ==
During the Second World War, Price served in the armed forces as a research worker in a laboratory, helping treat injuries from poisonous gases and burns. After the war he was on staff at the Rockefeller Institute for Medical Research.

In 1951, he became an assistant professor of biochemistry and a research associate in epidemiology at Johns Hopkins University. The following year, he published his paper on bacterial viruses.

=== Rocky Mountain spotted fever ===
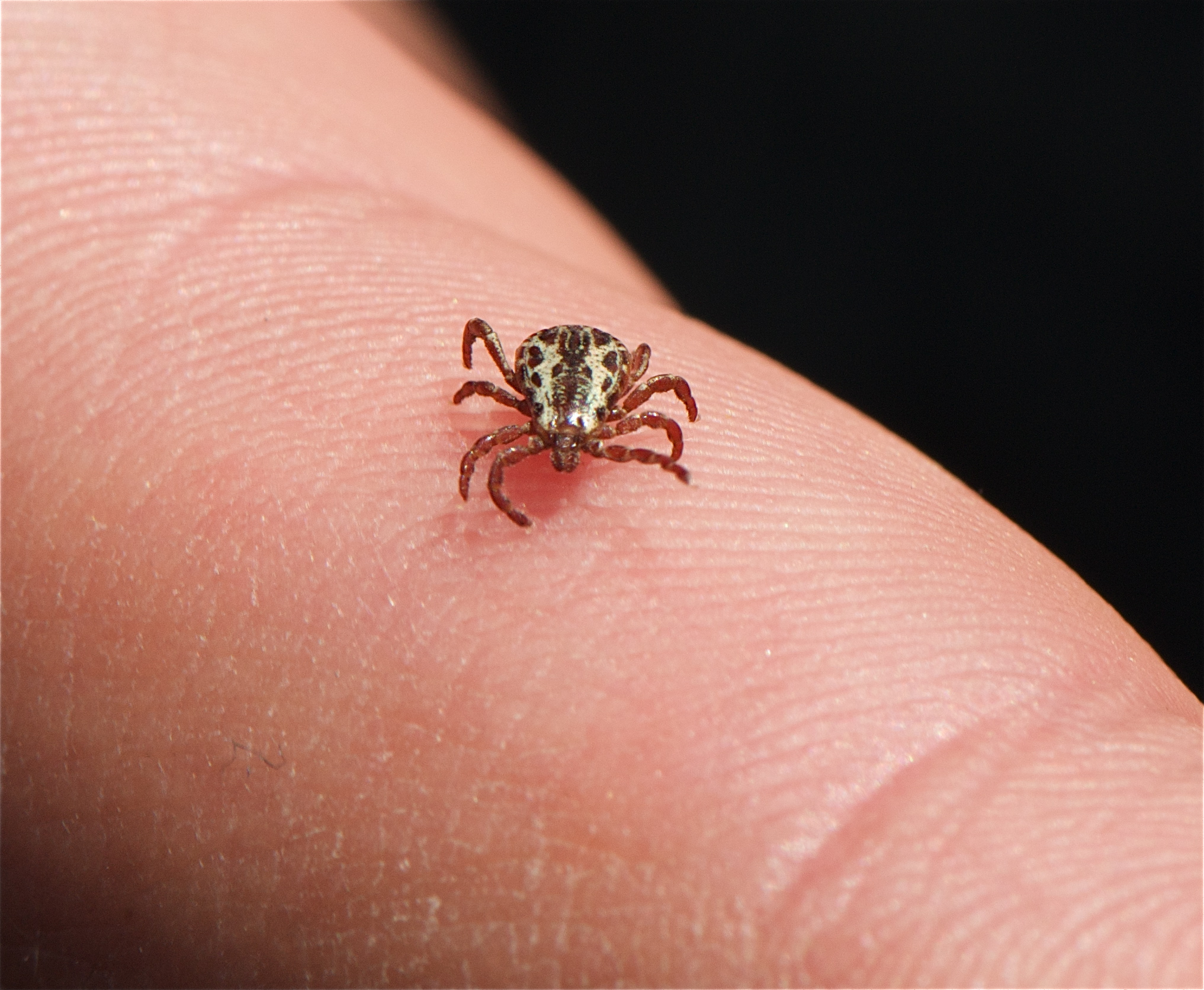
Dermacentor variabilis, vector of Rocky Mountain spotted fever

In 1954, he detailed how ticks of the genus Dermacentor, not haemaphysalis, were the main vectors of Rickettsia rickettsii that caused Rocky mountain spotted fever in humans.

He co-authored a paper that reported that Rickettsia rickettsii could be made avirulent by treatment with PABA.

=== Common cold ===
In 1953, when a cluster of nurses developed a mild respiratory illness, Price took nasal passage samples and isolated the first rhinovirus, which he called the JH virus, named after Johns Hopkins. At the time, the JH virus was the cause of almost one third of cases of the common cold. His findings were published in 1956. According to paediatrician Paul Offit, in his book Vaccinated; One man's quest to defeat the world's deadliest diseases, Price subsequently cultured the virus in the kidney cells of monkeys, added formaldehyde to kill the virus, and then administered it by injection into a hundred local school boys. Over the following two years, he reported that his vaccine reduced the likelihood of catching the common cold by eight-fold. Price did however clarify that "it's absolutely misleading if anyone thinks we are going to have an all-inclusive cure for colds". His findings were published in 1957. It triggered widespread media attention and was acknowledged by virologist George Hirst, who was director of the Public Health Research Institute at the time when he said “the work by Dr. Price on the new JH virus is a promising lead in the attack on the common cold.” Price featured in Life magazine, The Times, The New York Times and Time. However, Price's own supervisor at Johns Hopkins doubted his results. In Offit's book, Maurice Hilleman in the early 1960s, who later became an expert in vaccine research, is said to have disputed Price's data as untrue and saying that "his study was a complete fraud". In Cathy Curtis's biography of Price's second wife, Grace Hartigan, she says that Price was "deceptive", "known for his tall tales" and likely "fabricated" his results. Journalist and author Susannah Cahalan, portrayed Price as "obsessed with finding a cure for the common cold". Price also believed that most people naturally harbored microbes and that environmental factors such as cold weather triggered them to cause illness.

=== Other work ===
At one time, the Department of Defense asked Price to study typhus in the armed forces.

While at Johns Hopkins, Price researched the development of resistance against the Japanese encephalitis (JE) virus in mice and monkeys.

With his group at the Johns Hopkins, Price, injected three virus strains, two of which originated from encephalitis viruses, into monkeys, and reported that this conferred protection against "a whole family of diseases". The New York Times in 1964, reported that Price's work may one day lead to a safe vaccine for encephalitis.

=== Awards ===
In 1954, for his work on Rocky Mountain spotted fever and other rickettsial diseases, he received the Theobald Smith Award. In 1963, he received the Howard Taylor Ricketts Award.

== Personal life ==
His first marriage ended in divorce. As an art collector he met artist Grace Hartigan and they married in 1960; his second marriage and her fourth. In the mid-1960s, he began to self-administer experimental encephalitis vaccines, which led to "impaired judgment, inappropriate responses, memory loss, anxiety and personality changes".

== Death ==
On April 30, 1981, at the age of 58, Price died of meningitis at the Mercy Hospital, Baltimore, Maryland, following a decade-long mental and physical decline, caused by injecting himself with an experimental vaccine against encephalitis.

== Selected publications ==
- Price, Winston H. (1952). "Bacterial Viruses". Annual Review of Microbiology. 6 (1): 333–348. doi:10.1146/annurev.mi.06.100152.002001. ISSN 0066-4227. PMID 13008401.
- Price, Winston H. (1953). "The epidemiology of Rocky Mountain spotted fever: I The Characterization of Strain Virulence of Rickettsia Rickettsii"". American Journal of Epidemiology. 58 (2): 248–268. doi:10.1093/oxfordjournals.aje.a119604. ISSN 1476-6256. PMID 13080263.
- Gilford, J. H.; Price, Winston H. (1955). "virulent-avirulent conversions of Rickettsia Rickettsii in vitro" (PDF). Proceedings of the National Academy of Sciences. Biochemistry. 41 (11): 870–873. Bibcode:1955PNAS...41..870G. doi:10.1073/pnas.41.11.870. ISSN 0027-8424. PMC 534296. PMID 16589763.
- Price, Winston H. (1956). "The isolation of a new virus associated with respiratory clinical disease in humans". Proceedings of the National Academy of Sciences. 42 (12): 892–896. Bibcode:1956PNAS...42..892P. doi:10.1073/pnas.42.12.892. ISSN 0027-8424. PMC 528365. PMID 16589969.
- Price, Winston H. (1957). "Vaccine for the prevention in humans of coldlike symptoms associated with the JH virus". Proceedings of the National Academy of Sciences. 43 (9): 790–795. Bibcode:1957PNAS...43..790P. doi:10.1073/pnas.43.9.790. ISSN 0027-8424. PMC 534328. PMID 16590087.
- Price, Winston H.; Parks, James; O'Leary, Walter; Ganaway, James; Lee, Ralph (1963). "A Sequential Immunization Procedure against Certain Group B Arboviruses". The American Journal of Tropical Medicine and Hygiene. 12 (4): 624–638. doi:10.4269/ajtmh.1963.12.624. ISSN 0002-9637.
