= Grace Hartigan =

American painter (1922–2008)

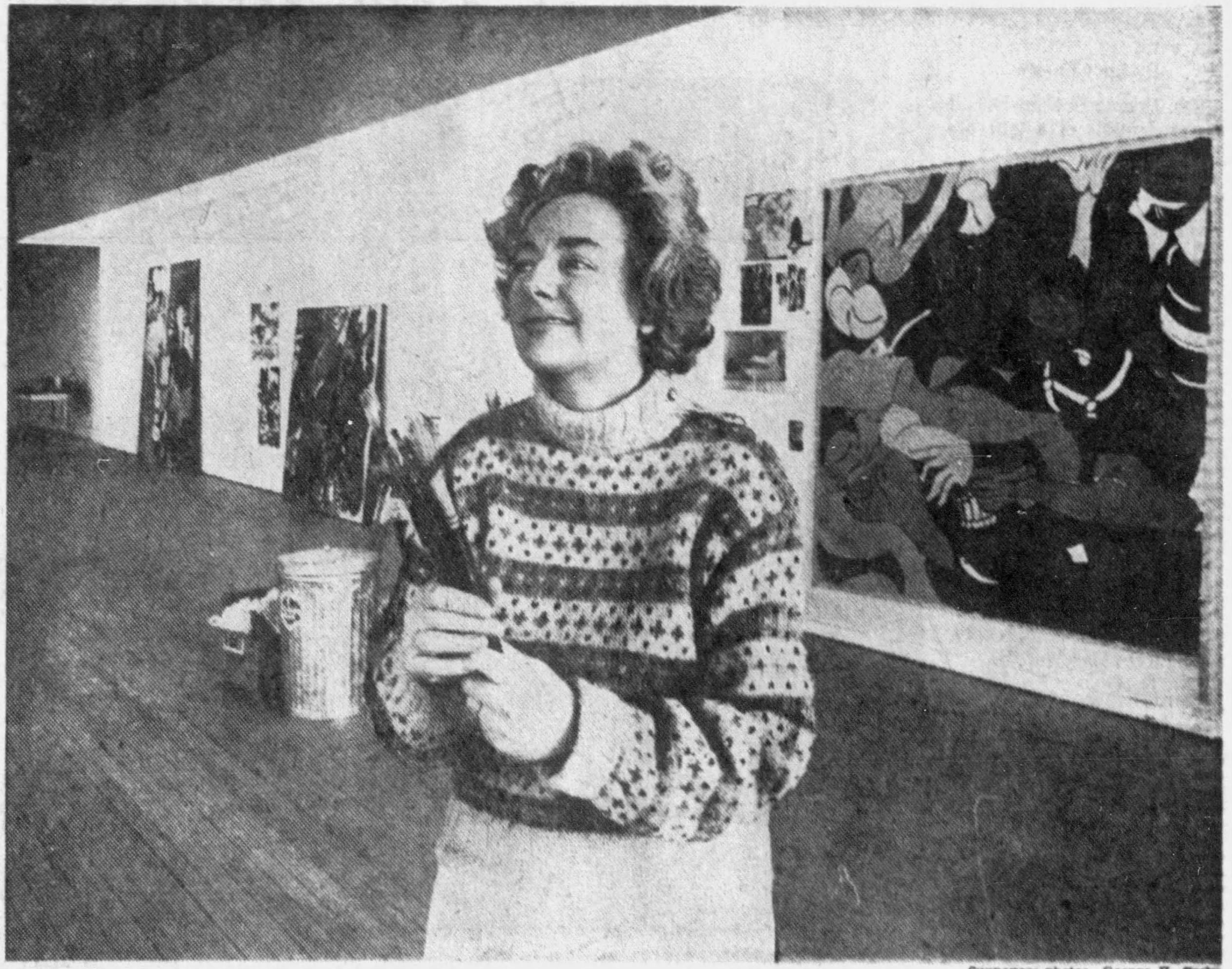
- Hartigan in 1969, photographed by The Evening Sun in Baltimore
- Born: March 28, 1922; Newark, New Jersey, US
- Died: November 15, 2008 (aged 86); Baltimore, Maryland, US
- Known for: Painting
- Movement: Abstract expressionism
- Spouse(s): Robert Jachens (m. 1941) (div. 1947) Harry Jackson (m. 1949) (annulled 1950) Robert Keene (m. 1958) (div. 1960) Winston Price (m. 1960) (died 1981)
- Children: 1 son

Grace Hartigan (March 28, 1922 – November 15, 2008) was an American abstract expressionist painter and a significant member of the vibrant New York School of the 1950s and 1960s. Her circle of friends, who frequently inspired one another in their artistic endeavors, included Jackson Pollock, Larry Rivers, Helen Frankenthaler, Willem and Elaine de Kooning and Frank O'Hara. Her paintings are held by numerous major institutions, including the Museum of Modern Art in New York City. As director of the Maryland Institute College of Art's Hoffberger School of Painting, she influenced numerous young artists.

== Early life ==
Born in Newark, New Jersey, of Irish-English descent, Hartigan was the oldest of four children. Encouraging her romantic fantasies, her father and grandmother often sang songs and told her stories. Her mother, however, disapproved. A resident of Millburn, New Jersey, she graduated from Millburn High School in 1940. At 19, she was married to Robert Jachens. A planned move to Alaska, where the young couple intended to live as pioneers, ended in California, where Hartigan began painting with her husband's encouragement. After her husband was drafted in 1942, Hartigan returned to New Jersey to study mechanical drafting at the Newark College of Engineering. She also worked as a draftsman in an airplane factory to support herself and her son. During this time, she studied painting with Isaac Lane Muse. Through him, she was introduced to the work of Henri Matisse and Kimon Nicolaïdes’s The Natural Way to Draw, which influenced her later work as a painter.

Hartigan said of her foray into painting, "I didn't choose painting. It chose me. I didn't have any talent. I just had genius."

== Career ==
=== Early years ===
In 1945, Hartigan moved to New York City, and became a member of the downtown artistic community. Her friends included Jackson Pollock, Larry Rivers, Helen Frankenthaler, Willem de Kooning and Elaine de Kooning, Frank O'Hara and Knox Martin. Hartigan gained her reputation as part of the New York School of artists and painters that emerged in New York City during the 1940s and 1950s. She was selected by Clement Greenberg and Meyer Schapiro for the New Talent exhibition at Koontz Gallery in New York in 1950. The following year she had her first solo exhibition.

Hartigan was often thought of as a "second generation Abstract Expressionist", being heavily influenced by her colleagues of the time. Her early career was characterized by experiments with total abstraction, as seen in the work Six by Six (1951) currently in the collection of the Frances Lehman Loeb Art Center in Poughkeepsie, NY. Beginning in the early fifties, Hartigan began to incorporate more recognizable motifs and characters into her paintings. Also during this time, she exhibited under the name George Hartigan in an attempt to achieve greater recognition for her work. She started to use Grace as her first name in 1953.

=== 1950s and 1960s ===
In 1952–1953, Hartigan collaborated with her close friend and poet Frank O'Hara on a series of 12 paintings called "Oranges", based on O’Hara's series of poems by the same name. The paintings integrated some of the text of the poems and were exhibited during her third solo show on March 31, 1953, at the Tibor de Nagy Gallery.

On April 18, 1953, Alfred Barr and Dorothy Miller selected The Persian Jacket (1952) for the collection of the Museum of Modern Art. Two months later, Barr secured a patron to buy the painting for $400 and donate it to the museum. Hartigan became the first of the second generation abstract expressionists to have a piece in the museum. In February 1954, she had a sold-out exhibition at Tibor de Nagy Gallery. River Bathers (1953) was purchased by a collector (Alexander Bing) for $1,000 and gifted to the Museum of Modern Art. The Whitney Museum acquired Greek Girl.

In the summer of 1954, Hartigan started to use her first name instead of George. In October 1954, her work was included in the exhibition Paintings from the Museum Collection at the Museum of Modern Art. In 1954, she sold $5,500 worth of work, (compared to Bill de Kooning's $7,000 during that same period).

In 1956, Hartigan's paintings were included in the 12 Americans at the Museum of Modern Art in New York, as well as in The New American Painting, which traveled throughout Europe from 1958 to 1959. She received significant press coverage as she was one of few women at this time to receive this level of exposure. Subsequently, she was featured in Life magazine in 1957 and Newsweek in 1959. Life referred to Hartigan as “the most celebrated of the young American women painters.”

Hartigan's work around this time shifted, and she began creating more transparent paintings and watercolor collages. In an explanation of this change she said, "I have left the groan and the anguish behind. The cry has become a song." Examples of these paintings include Phoenix, William of Orange, and Lily Pond (all completed in 1962). Also in 1962, Hartigan painted Monroe, marking another shift in her work toward more anxiety-laden imagery. The Hunted (1963), Human Fragment (1963), and Mistral (1964) are representations of this mindset and approach to painting. JFK's assassination and the rise of Pop art (a movement Hartigan vehemently opposed) occurred around this time. She said, “The world was ill at ease. Socially and morally as well as culturally, America suddenly seemed a frightening and foreign place." (Mattison 68). In 1965, Hartigan was named director of the Hoffberger School of Painting, a graduate painting program at Maryland Institute College of Art, where she began teaching part-time in 1964 and continued until her death.

Modern Cycle (1967) at the Smithsonian American Art Museum in 2023

More jovial paintings of the ‘60s included Reisterstown Mall (1965) and Modern Cycle (1967), in which she continued to draw from popular culture, but retained her expressive hand.

When the Raven was White (1969), Hartigan’s first memorial painting since Frank O’Hara (1966), foreshadowed future paintings of the 1970s. A memorial to her friend Martha Jackson, the work was also autobiographical. The painting represented hope amidst dark times, that there was a time before "the raven turned black". Concurrently, Hartigan was experiencing trauma in her own life – alcoholism, attempted suicide and the mental and physical decline of her husband.

=== 1970s ===
The 1970s marked a time of autobiographically laden imagery in Hartigan's artwork. She had been influenced by the Cubists since her early education, and the paintings of the '70s heavily reflected that interest. The paintings had crowded compositions, with shallow space, and collections of recognizable subjects. During this decade, Philip Guston became Hartigan's closest artist friend. Their imagery had in common that icons in the work were representations of their respective thoughts and feelings.

Harold Rosenberg, an art critic with whom Hartigan had corresponded with since her split with Greenberg in the 1950s, continued to be a part of Hartigan's life in the 1970s. He argued that “the enemy of art is conformity, not just to the values of values of a totalitarian state or to a society of mass consumption, but to one’s own established style.

Beware of Gifts (1971), Another Birthday (1971), Summer to Fall (1971–72), Black Velvet (1972), Autumn Shop Window (1972), Purple Passion (1973), Coloring Book of Ancient Egypt (1973), I Remember Lascaux (1978)and Twilight of the Gods (1978) were all painted during this period.

Her image is included in the iconic 1972 poster Some Living American Women Artists by Mary Beth Edelson.

=== 1980s and 1990s ===
In the 1980s, Hartigan returned to some of the figurative imagery that was a part of her work early on in her career. Paper dolls, saints, martyrs, opera singers, and queens were subjects in some of these paintings of the 1980s. During this time she also experimented with various painting tools (sticks, wool mitts, rags), which she had done in the 1950s. Hartigan was struggling with alcoholism, and each day, trying to abstain, put much vigor into her arts practice.

In 1992, she was given a solo exhibition at ACA Galleries in New York City. In 1993, Hartigan's work was included in the "Hand-Painted Pop" exhibition at the Whitney Museum.

== Legacy ==
In 2015, Restless Ambition: Grace Hartigan, Painter, a biography by Cathy Curtis was published by Oxford University Press and Reviewed in The Wall Street Journal.

In 2016, her work was included in the exhibition Women of Abstract Expressionism organized by the Denver Art Museum.

In 2017, Hartigan was one of the subjects of the book Ninth Street Women: Lee Krasner, Elaine de Kooning, Grace Hartigan, Joan Mitchell, and Helen Frankenthaler: Five Painters and the Movement That Changed Modern Art by Mary Gabriel.

In 2023, her work was included in the exhibition Action, Gesture, Paint: Women Artists and Global Abstraction 1940-1970 at the Whitechapel Gallery in London.

Grace Hartigan: The Gift of Attention, a solo exhibition was organized by the North Carolina Museum of Art and shown there April 12 – August 10, 2025. It traveled to the Portland Museum of Art, Portland, Maine, October 10, 2025 – January 11, 2026.

== Personal life ==
Hartigan married Robert Jachens in 1941 and had one son, born 1942. They were divorced in 1947. Artist Harry Jackson was Hartigan's second husband. They married in 1949, but the marriage was annulled in 1950. Hartigan married Long Island gallery owner Robert Keene in 1958; they were divorced in 1960.

In 1959, Hartigan met Dr. Winston Price, a research scientist at Johns Hopkins University, whom she married in 1960. Price died in 1981 after a decade-long mental and physical decline that was caused by injecting himself with an experimental vaccine against encephalitis that left him with spinal meningitis.

Hartigan had a close friendship with Frank O'Hara. They had a falling out and did not speak for six years, but eventually reconnected, and were friends until O’Hara's death in 1966. Philip Guston was the artist Hartigan was closest to in the 1970s.

Hartigan died in November 2008, aged 86, of liver failure.

== Public collections ==
- Art Institute of Chicago
- Baltimore Museum of Art
- Buffalo AKG Art Museum
- Carnegie Museum of Art
- Detroit Institute of Arts
- Figge Art Museum, Davenport, IA
- Metropolitan Museum of Art
- Minneapolis Institute of Art
- Museum of Modern Art, New York, NY
- The Nelson-Atkins Museum of Art
- National Gallery of Art
- Philadelphia Museum of Art
- Rhode Island School of Design Museum
- Saint Louis Art Museum
- Smithsonian American Art Museum, Washington, DC
- Solomon R. Guggenheim Museum, New York, NY
- Whitney Museum of American Art
- Worcester Art Museum

== Bibliography ==
- Gabriel, Mary. Ninth Street Women: Lee Krasner, Elaine de Kooning, Grace Hartigan, Joan Mitchell, and Helen Frankenthaler: five painters and the movement that changed modern art. New York: Little, Brown and Company, 2018
- Hirsh, Sharon L., Grace Hartigan: Painting Art History. Carlisle, PA: The Trout Gallery, Dickinson College, 2003.
- LaMoy, William and Joseph McCaffrey (Eds.), The Journals of Grace Hartigan. Syracuse, NY: Syracuse University Press, 2009,
- Mattison, Robert S., Grace Hartigan: A Painter's World. New York: Hudson Hills Press, 1990.
- Marika Herskovic, American Abstract Expressionism of the 1950s An Illustrated Survey, (New York School Press, 2003.) ISBN 0-9677994-1-4. p. 162–165
- Marika Herskovic, New York School Abstract Expressionists Artists Choice by Artists, (New York School Press, 2000.) ISBN 0-9677994-0-6. p. 16; p. 37; p. 174–177
- Marika Herskovic, American Abstract and Figurative Expressionism Style Is Timely Art Is Timeless An Illustrated Survey With Artists' Statements, Artwork and Biographies. (New York School Press, 2009.) ISBN 978-0-9677994-2-1. p. 116–119
