= MAZON: A Jewish Response to Hunger =

- Founded: 1985; 41 years ago
- Tax ID no.: 22-2624532
- Legal status: 501(c)(3) nonprofit organization
- Headquarters: Los Angeles, California, United States
- Services: Partnership grantmaking; education, outreach, and advocacy; strategic initiatives.
- President, Chief Executive Officer: Abby J. Leibman
- Chair: Rabbi Joel Pitkowsky
- Revenue: $10,900,000 (2025)
- Expenses: $11,000,000 (2025)
- Employees: 23 (2023)
- Website: mazon.org

MAZON: A Jewish Response to Hunger is an American nonprofit working to end hunger among people of all faiths and backgrounds in the United States and Israel.

MAZON, which means "food" or "sustenance" in Hebrew, pursues hunger relief through grantmaking, public education, and federal policy advocacy, rooted in the Jewish values of tzedakah (charity) and tikkun olam (repairing the world). The organization focuses on both immediate food assistance and long-term systemic change. MAZON has offices in Los Angeles, California (headquarters) and Washington, D.C.

== Leadership ==
Rabbi Joel Pitkowsky of Teaneck, New Jersey is the current chair of the Board of Directors. The immediate Past Chair is Liz Kanter Groskind of Tucson, Arizona. Other former board chairs include Shirley Davidoff of Dallas, Rabbi Harold Kravitz of Minneapolis, Minnesota, Joel E. Jacob, Eve Biskind Klothen, Theodore R. Mann, David Napell, and Rabbi Arnold Rachlis.

Abby J. Leibman is MAZON's President and Chief Executive Officer. Leibman has held this position since March 2011.

== Inspiration and establishment ==
MAZON was founded in 1985 by Leonard Fein, a Jewish writer, activist, and academic known to friends and family as "Leibel." Fein had previously co-founded Moment Magazine with Elie Wiesel in 1975 and served as a professor of political science at MIT and Brandeis University. Rabbi David Saperstein, director of the Religious Action Center in Washington, described him as "the most influential liberal ideologue in American Jewish life."

The idea for MAZON came to Fein when he learned that party caterers were pulling in half a billion dollars a year from bar mitzvahs, weddings, and other Jewish celebrations. "A light bulb flashed over my head," he told The Times in 1987, "and I started figuring a small percent of that sum could mean a lot of food for hungry people." He asked families to contribute 3 percent of the cost of their celebrations — a figure he called "small enough to be reasonable and large enough to be meaningful." The model drew on an ancient Jewish tradition in which rabbis did not allow celebrations to begin until the community's poor and hungry were fed. Within a year of its founding, MAZON was raising $80,000 a month.

Fein served on MAZON's board from its founding until his death on August 13, 2014, at the age of 80.

== Programs ==
=== Challah for Hunger ===
Challah for Hunger is a campus-based hunger relief program that mobilizes college students to bake and sell challah bread, donating proceeds to hunger relief organizations. Founded in 2004 at Scripps College by Eli Winkelman, it grew into a national network of more than 80 campus chapters across the United States, Canada, the United Kingdom, and Australia, raising more than $2 million for anti-hunger organizations since its founding.

The program operated independently as Challah for Hunger until 2022, when it rebranded as Nazun. In August 2023, Nazun approached MAZON about absorbing the program, citing difficulty sustaining itself as an independent nonprofit. MAZON agreed, and the arrangement took effect on August 4, 2023, with the program reverting to the Challah for Hunger name under MAZON's stewardship.

== Advocacy ==
MAZON maintains a Washington, D.C. office and engages in federal policy advocacy focused on hunger relief programs, particularly the Supplemental Nutrition Assistance Program (SNAP). The organization has opposed proposed cuts to SNAP and other federal nutrition programs, arguing that the charitable sector cannot substitute for robust government safety net programs.

MAZON has coordinated sign-on letters to Congress from Jewish organizations nationwide. In 2025, nearly 200 Jewish organizations joined a MAZON-led letter to Congress opposing proposed cuts to SNAP and Medicaid. The organization also distributes grants to state and local anti-hunger advocacy organizations through its Emerging Advocacy Fund, supporting groups that lobby for expanded access to programs including SNAP, Women, Infants, and Children (WIC), and the Food Distribution Program on Indian Reservations.

== Hunger Museum ==
The MAZON Hunger Museum opened on March 9, 2023. Conceived by MAZON president and CEO Abby J. Leibman, the project took three years to develop.

The museum is entirely virtual, with six galleries chronicling more than a century of hunger and anti-hunger public policy in the United States, from the Civil War through the COVID-19 pandemic. In addition to its galleries, the museum features a virtual auditorium, a SNAP Café where visitors can calculate the cost of meals against a SNAP budget, and a Wishing Tree inspired by Yoko Ono's Wish Tree project.

== See also ==
- Leonard Fein
- Supplemental Nutrition Assistance Program
- Tikkun olam
- Tzedakah
- Challah for Hunger
