= Harry Jackson (artist) =

American painter

Harry Andrew Jackson
- Born: Harry Aaron Shapiro Jr. April 18, 1924; Chicago, Illinois, U.S.
- Died: April 25, 2011 (aged 87); Sheridan, Wyoming, U.S.
- Movement: Abstract expressionism; realism

Harry Andrew Jackson (April 18, 1924 – April 25, 2011), born Harry Aaron Shapiro Jr., was an American artist. He began his career as a Marine combat artist, then later worked in the abstract expressionist, realist, and American western styles.

== Early life and military career ==
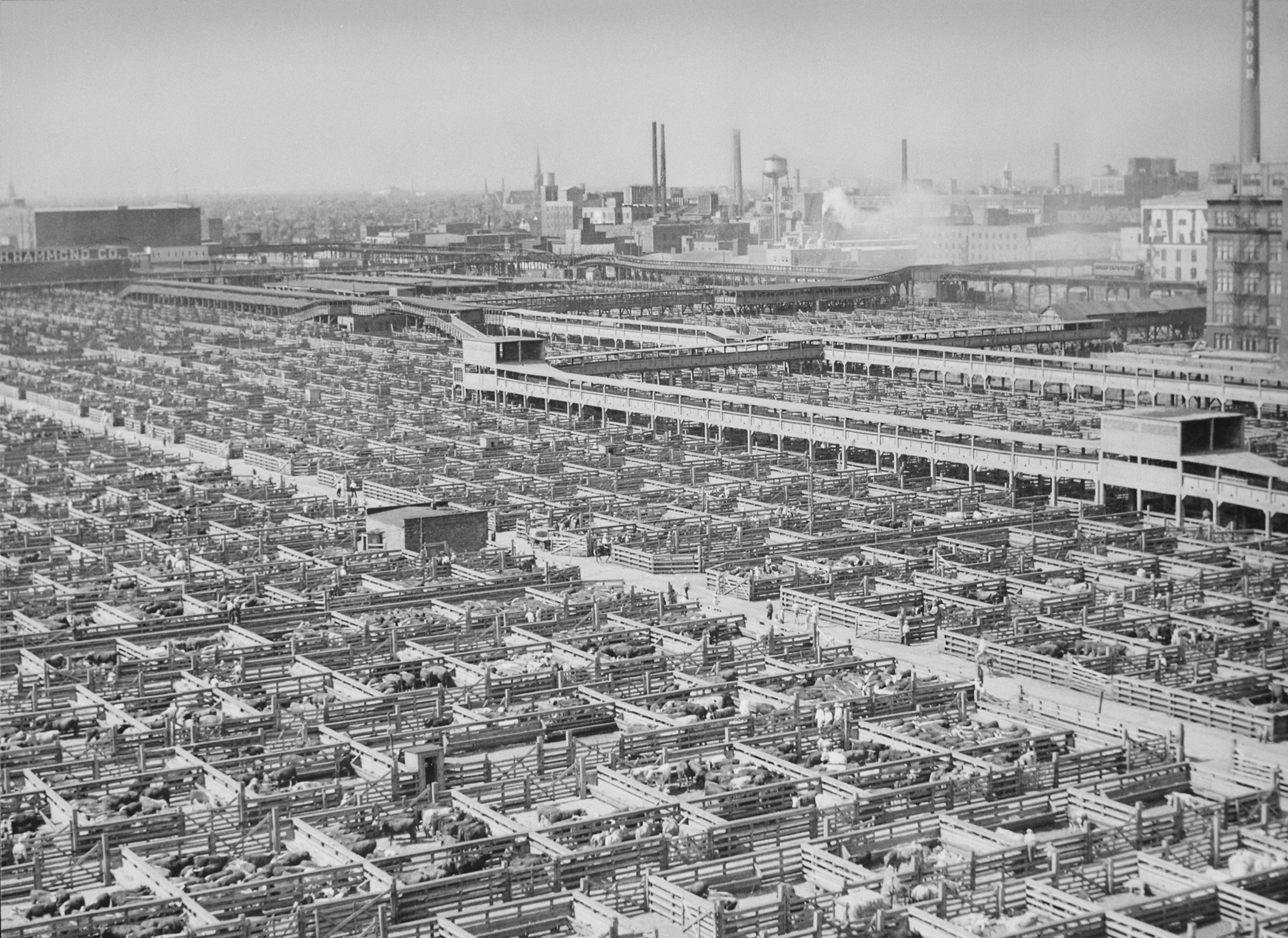
The Union Stock Yards, where Jackson worked in his mother's lunchroom. During his time in the meatpacking district, Jackson was fascinated by the cowboys he met there and developed an interest in the American frontier and Western genre.

Harry Aaron Shapiro Jr. was born to Harry Shapiro and Ellen Jackson in Chicago on April 18, 1924. His name was changed to Harry Andrew Jackson after his parents divorced. As a child, Jackson sometimes skipped classes and wandered the streets of Chicago. He worked in his mother's lunchroom in the Union Stock Yards. Jackson liked the cowboys he met there and developed an interest in the American frontier and Western genre starting at a young age. In his early teens, he began taking Saturday classes at the Art Institute of Chicago after his teacher recognized his artistic abilities and secured a scholarship on his behalf.

Inspired by a February 1937 photo spread in Life about Wyoming's cowboy lifestyle ("Winter Comes to a Wyoming Ranch"), Jackson ran away from home in 1938, at fourteen years old. He hitchhiked to Wyoming, where he worked as a ranch hand in Cody. In 1938 he worked for Earl Martin at the Bradford Ranch on the North Fork, then with Cal Todd on the Pitchfork Ranch near Meeteetse (which he later said was his "spiritual birthplace") in 1939. He eventually became a cowboy. Jackson also began sketching, according to The New York Times, in the ways of Frederic Remington. During each winter season between 1938 and 1942, he returned to Chicago to continue his art education.

In 1942, when he was eighteen years old, Jackson enlisted in the Marines during World War II and became a sketch artist for the Fifth Amphibious Corps. He was wounded during the Battle of Tarawa in November 1943, and later in Saipan. The injuries earned him two Purple Hearts and left Jackson suffering from epileptic seizures, mood disorders, and posttraumatic stress disorder for the rest of his life. In September 1944, Jackson returned to the United States and became the youngest ever Marine Corps combat artist at age twenty. He was stationed in Los Angeles and, in this role, drew and painted "[his] bloodiest close-combat experiences". Jackson was honorably discharged in October 1945. He spent the winter season at Pitchfork Ranch before relocating to New York in May 1946.

== Abstract expressionism to realism ==
Red, Yellow, and Blue (1951)

While in Los Angeles, Jackson's style was strongly influenced by Jackson Pollock's painting The Moon-Woman Cuts the Circle, which he said "shot the first crack of daylight into my blocked-off brain". Jackson recalled, "That single artwork caused me to relive (1943) Tarawa's bloody butchery; I knew that I had to meet Pollock face to face ASAP." He was also influenced by Wassily Kandinsky's work.

During this "artistic conversion", Jackson moved to New York, befriended Pollock, and began painting in the abstract expressionist style. He gained a following after art critic Clement Greenberg and art historian Meyer Schapiro included Jackson in their "Talent 1950" exhibition at the Kootz Gallery. Greenberg said that Jackson produced "the best first show since Jackson Pollock's". For the next few years, he exhibited work at the Tibor de Nagy Gallery, which is closely affiliated with the second generation of abstract expressionism.

Jackson's travels to Europe in the early 1950s influenced him to become a realist artist instead of an abstract expressionist painter. In 1956, Life profiled him in an eight-page photo-essay called "Painter Striving to Find Himself: Harry Jackson Turns to the Hard Way", describing Jackson as an "American painter of surging talent and ambition". Jackson moved back to Wyoming in 1970. By the early 1980s, he was one of the highest-paid American artists.

Jackson later recalled of his time in New York and transition to realism: "After Cézanne a lot of artists made art for art's sake, and when I became an Abstract Expressionist in New York I was among them". He said the New York school was "too removed from man" and "did not speak to the people I was born and raised with. ... John Wayne spoke for these people ... he was a wonderful embodiment of the timeless strength of the rugged individualist, the one-man majority I believe in with my entire being."

From the late 1990s to 2006, Jackson returned to painting. His work harkened back to his abstract expressionist experiments and military experiences, and also include "more peaceful, even transcendental registers of feeling" in the "Quartet" paintings.

== Works ==
The Range Burial (1963)

Among Jackson's combat artworks were Betio Beachhead (1944), Marine in Battle (1944), and Charging Under Fire (1945). One of his first realist works was the large-scale painting The Italian Bar (1956), which depicts a tavern and its patrons on Little Italy's Mulberry Street. The work has been called "one of the most important portrait paintings in American 20th century art".

In 1958, he was commissioned by Ambassador Robert Douglas Coe and the Buffalo Bill Center of the West's Whitney Gallery of Western Art, in Cody, to create the sequential paintings The Stampede (1965) and The Range Burial (1963), which were installed in 1965. Western influences are seen in these works, which depict a longhorn stampede dragging a cowboy off his horse, and his subsequent funeral. Jackson dedicated The Range Burial to Pollock. Both works were loaned to the Atlanta Art Conservation Center in 2009 for conservation; The Range Burial now hangs in the Booth Western Art Museum. The 10-by-21-foot (3.0 m × 6.4 m) paintings were also executed as bronzes and lithographs. In the mid-1960s, Jackson created a portrait of Bob Dylan during a transitional time in the singer's career.

In 1969, Jackson sculpted The Marshal for Time, which depicted Wayne as Rooster Cogburn in the film True Grit, riding a horse and carrying a rifle. Following Wayne's death in 1979, Jackson was commissioned by Great Western Savings & Loan to create a sculpture of Wayne, who had appeared in a series of commercials for the company during his last two years, for the Great Western Savings & Loan building (now Flynt Building) along Wilshire Boulevard in Beverly Hills, California. Prior to The Horseman's debut, the Beverly Hills Architectural Commission requested multiple changes, including the removal of multicolored paint and a motor in its base that would have slowly rotated the sculpture. The 21-foot (6.4 m), 6-tonne (6,000 kg) bronze sculpture was dedicated in 1984. In 1980, the monumental sculpture Sacagawea was dedicated at the Buffalo Bill Center of the West.

Between April 2005 and May 2006, Jackson completed the first six of his "Quartet" paintings, which he said "indicate the blissfully liberating spirit of Kandinsky and Pollock". The first four are featured in the film Harry Jackson Talks About Art, which is about the intersection of Jackson's abstract and realist work. His bronze sculpture Sacajawea Modified II (2005) was the featured work for the 2006 Buffalo Bill Art Show and Sale, for which Jackson was named "Honored Artist".

In 2007, California State University, Northridge opened the Washington Mutual Gallery in the campus' Redwood Hall, showcasing thirty Jackson sculptures on permanent display. The collection's bronzes, valued at $740,000, depict cowboys, Native Americans, and early Western life, and were donated by Washington Mutual in 2006 to commemorate the "profound role Cal State Northridge plays in the cultural life of the region".

== Personal and later life ==
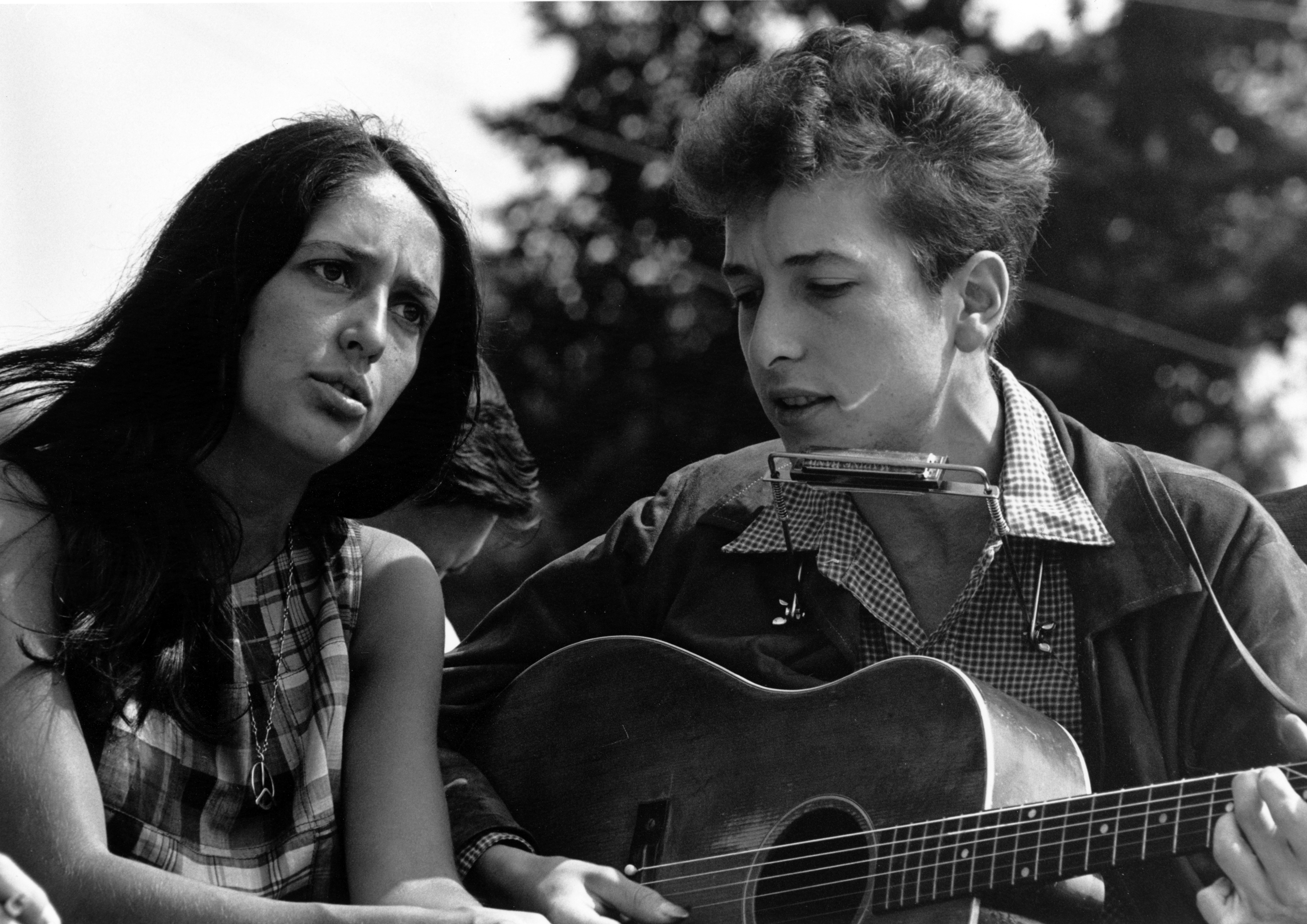
Joan Baez and Bob Dylan in 1963. Jackson performed with both at Carnegie Hall and, in the mid-1960s, created a portrait of Dylan during a transitional time in the singer's career.

Jackson did some acting on Hollywood radio and recorded songs he learned at Pitchfork Ranch for Folkways Records during the 1950s. His album The Cowboy: His Songs, Ballads and Brag Talk was released in 1959. He recorded for Columbia Records in New York during the 1960s, and even sang at Carnegie Hall with Dylan and Joan Baez, and Pete Seeger. His repertory included songs like "The Pot Wrassler" and "Streets of Laredo", and were "all sung in an authentic, unadorned style far removed from popular music or the folk-pop of the period".

In 1954, Jackson purchased a series of 1860 sketches by Paul Cézanne for $80 from someone at Aix-en-Provence who claimed that his father was the artist's caretaker. Jackson tried to sell them in 1962, but they were deemed stolen and confiscated after a Louvre seal was found during the authentication process. He fought for ownership of the sketches for five years and withdrew his claim in 1967. He said, "I was mad. Darn mad. But now I have come full circle and am returning the drawings, which is what I would have done immediately if the FBI had not taken the drawings and I had just been notified by Rewald."

He began a private journal, which eventually grew to more than 100 volumes, in March 1945. Jackson's journal entry about meeting Pollock read:

On Monday Oct 11, 1948, I finally met Jackson Pollock who became my friend and mentor who deeply influenced my entire life's work to this day. A few days after Jack and I bonded, my wild White Figure painting volcanically erupted from my sealed-off blacked-out mind. It was far too revealing, so I didn't show it to anyone until my exhaustive Retrospective at the University of Wyoming Art Museum in 1987.

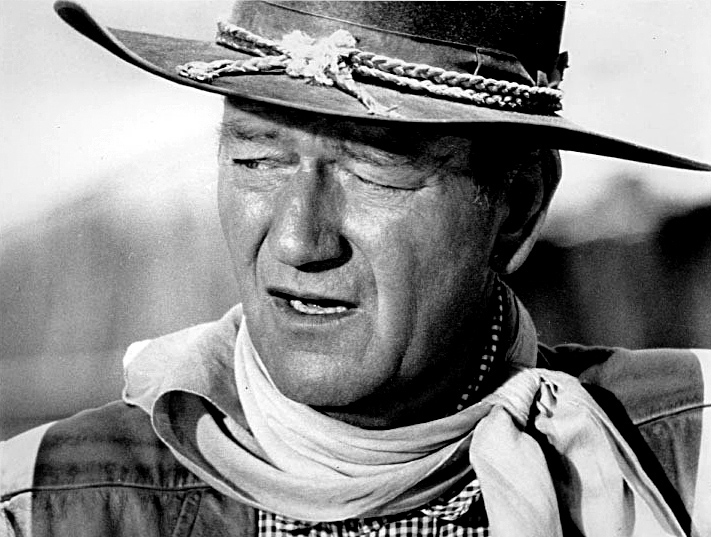
Publicity photo of John Wayne for the 1961 film The Comancheros. Jackson's sculpture The Marshal was created in 1969 for Time and depicted Wayne as Rooster Cogburn in the film True Grit. The two were friends during Wayne's final decade of life.

According to some sources, Jackson was married and divorced as many as six times. However, his official biography on the Harry Jackson Studios website states that he was married four times. One of his marriages was to abstract expressionist painter Grace Hartigan, which lasted for a year.

After leaving New York, Jackson lived in Wyoming and Camaiore, Italy, where he had a foundry and studio. According to the Buffalo Bill Center of the West, Jackson also resided in Meeteetse and Lost Cabin, Wyoming in his lifetime.

Jackson was reportedly "fiercely loyal to his friends" and often worked with others he deemed were "fellow mavericks". He and John Wayne became friends in the final decade of Wayne's life. In addition to the brain injuries inflicted during his military service, he was allegedly diagnosed with narcissistic personality disorder and, according to his son, "treated everyday like a life and death battle".

== Death and legacy ==
Jackson died at the Veterans Health Administration's medical center in Sheridan on April 25, 2011, at the age of 87, following several health issues during his final year. He was survived by three sons, two daughters, and four grandchildren. His oldest son, Matt, manages the Jackson collection and estate in Cody. In August 2013, the Wyoming Arts Council began developing a plan to preserve Jackson's work, which included the participation of the Buffalo Bill Center of the West, Nicolaysen Art Museum, and the University of Wyoming Art Museum. Matt continued efforts to fundraise the $5 million needed to maintain the collection and found an institution, and he also organized traveling exhibits to showcase his father's work. His goal was to keep the collection together, preferably within Wyoming, but the trust had to begin selling pieces after no offers to fund the preservation of the entire collection were received. Reno's Coeur d'Alene Art Auction sold a series of his artworks on July 23, 2011.

In 2014, after spending three years assembling and surveying their father's work following his death, Jackson's children searched for an institution to house the collection of more than 5,000 drawings, paintings, and sculptures Jackson had stored and displayed in his home in Cody and foundry in Italy. One of his sons, who serves as trustee of the Harry Jackson Trust, said: "Harry Jackson's body of work can only be fully examined now that he has passed away and stopped creating. The collection tells the full story of an unparalleled artist's life, and it's unlike any other ... [The collection is] something the art world has never had the chance to fully examine, and now that he is absent, we're learning so much more about his invaluable contribution to American art." The collection also included brushes, home videos, photographs, props, reference books, tools, Jackson's business and personal records, and more than 100 volumes of his journals.

The Nicolaysen Art Museum exhibited The Big Picture: A Look at the Life and Art of Harry Jackson from May to August, 2014. In 2015, Harry Jackson Studios exhibited Betio: Light and War, which consists of 56 paintings, for the first time and in conjunction with the Buffalo Bill Center of the West "Rendezvous Royale" fundraiser. Artist and critic Gordon McConnell, who was a curator for the Yellowstone Art Museum, described the exhibit as a "monumental masterpiece" that "deserves a place among the important paintings of our time." Also showcased were sculptures formerly stored at Jackson's foundry in Italy, along with dozens of other drawings, paintings, and sculptures.

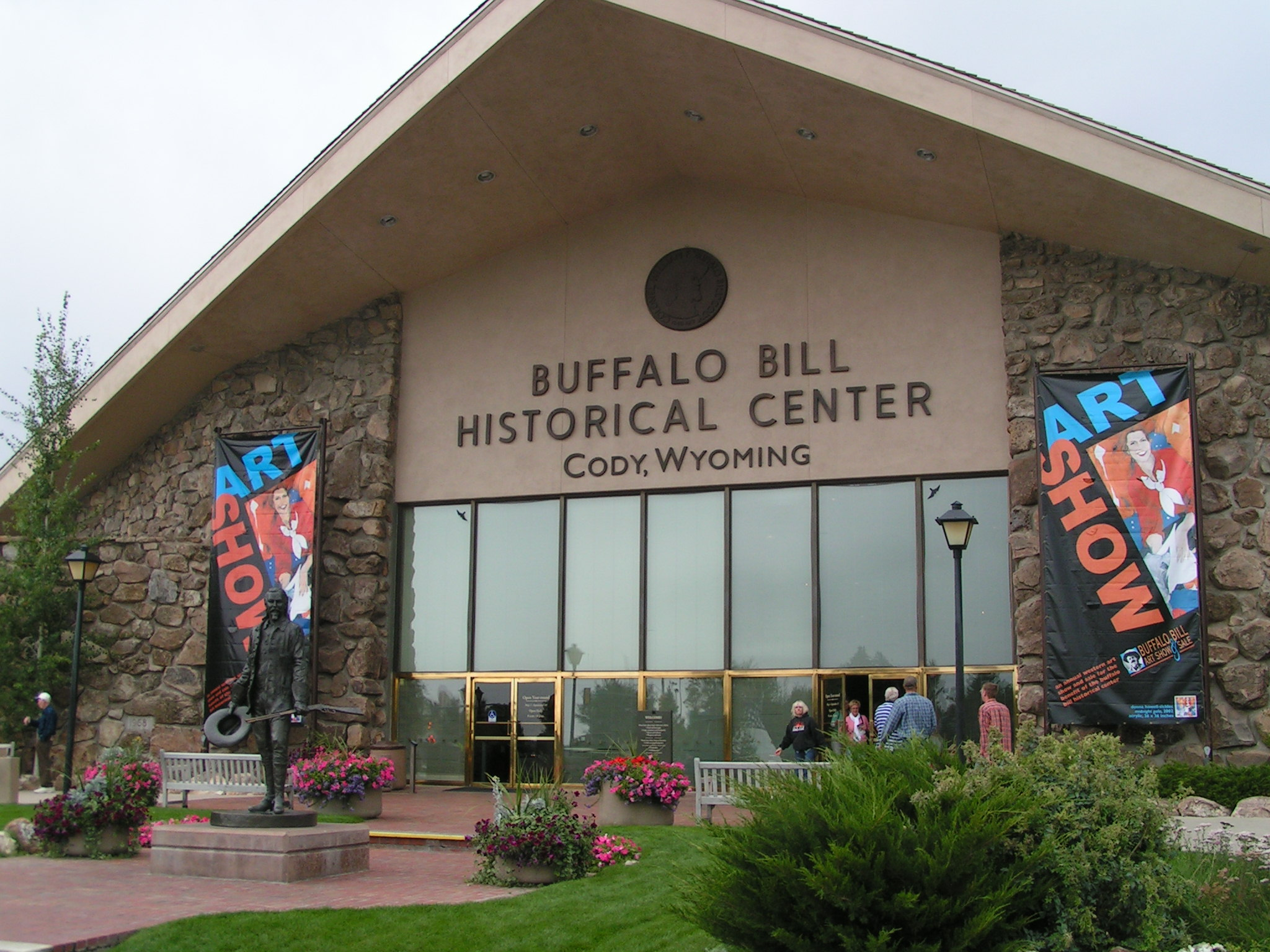
The Buffalo Bill Center of the West, which commissioned Jackson to create the sequential paintings The Stampede and The Range Burial in the 1960s, houses the largest museum collection of the artist's work in the United States.

Institutions with works by Jackson include the American Museum in Britain, Amon Carter Museum of American Art, Denver Art Museum, Gilcrease Museum, Lyndon Baines Johnson Library and Museum, Metropolitan Museum of Art, Ronald Reagan Presidential Library, and Smithsonian American Art Museum. His work is in the private collections of the House of Saud, Italian Federal Government, Queen Elizabeth II, and the Vatican. The Buffalo Bill Center of the West houses the largest museum collection of Jackson's work in the United States. Other Wyoming institutions with works by Jackson include the Meeteetse Museum, University of Wyoming, and the Wyoming State Museum, among other public and private collections.

== Reception ==
Jackson became most known for his abstract art and paintings and bronze sculptures of cowboys and Indians. He has also been credited for mastering the lost-wax method of bronze casting and reviving polychrome sculpture.

In 1980, The New York Times art critic Hilton Kramer said that Jackson's Western-inspired works were "unlike any other in the recent history of American art". Furthermore, Kramer said that the evolution of Jackson's style "has turned a well-known and highly praised but penurious young artist into one of the wealthiest 'unknown' artists in America — an artist unknown, that is, to the art world where his first reputation was made 30 years ago." Jackson received the Wyoming Arts Council Governor's Arts Award in 1990.

In Jackson's obituary, The New York Times described him as an "artist who captured the West". In 2013, National Geographic contributor Jordan Carlton Schaul described Jackson as the "preeminent Western artist of his time" and "one of the most distinguished American sculptors and painters in history".

Lyndon Johnson, Gerald Ford, and Ronald Reagan each appreciated and displayed Jackson's works, and selected his sculptures as gifts to heads of state. In 1976, Ford gave Queen Elizabeth II a sculpture called Two Champs, which depicts Clayton Danks hanging onto Steamboat, the stallion from Bucking Horse and Rider seen on Wyoming's vehicle registration plates, to celebrate the United States Bicentennial. Reagan kept eight bronzes in the White House.

== Selected list of works ==
The Marshal, Painted (1970)

=== Albums ===
- The Cowboy: His Songs, Ballads and Brag Talk (1959, 1965), Folkways Recordings

=== Drawings ===
- Tarawa-Betio (1940s), part of the collection of the National Museum of the Marine Corps

=== Exhibitions ===
- Well-Aimed Lighting: The Abstract Art of Harry Jackson (1953), Ucross Foundation Art Gallery (2012)
- The Big Picture: A Look at the Life and Art of Harry Jackson (2014), McMurry Gallery, Nicolaysen Art Museum
- Betio: Light and War (2015), consists of 56 canvases that together measure 14 feet (4.3 m) tall by nearly 50 feet (15 m) wide

=== Lithographs ===
- The Range Burial, based on his 1963 painting of the same name
- The Stampede, based on his 1965 painting of the same name

=== Monotypes ===
- "Random Monotypes", a series of 49 monotypes created by blotting dripped paint during the creation of La Fiesta, Mexican Composition, and Toro Rojo del Sol (1949)

=== Paintings ===
- Cowboy Harry, Self Portrait at 12 (1936)
- Tarawa-Betio (1944), part of the collection of the National Museum of the Marine Corps
- Untitled (1948), oil with sand on canvas
- White Figure (1948), abstract expressionist
- Collage (1949), abstract expressionist
- La Fiesta (1949), abstract expressionist, one of three completed in San Miguel de Allende, Mexico, after marrying Grace Hartigan
- Mexican Composition (1949), abstract expressionist, one of three completed in San Miguel de Allende, Mexico, after marrying Grace Hartigan
- Random Monoprint (1949), abstract expressionist
- Toro Rojo del Sol (1949), abstract expressionist, one of three completed in San Miguel de Allende, Mexico, after marrying Grace Hartigan
- The Italian Bar (1956)
- The Range Burial (1963), oil on canvas
- The Stampede (1965), oil on canvas
- Crucifixion at Betio (2002), abstract expressionist
- Quartet 1 (2005), abstract expressionist

=== Sculptures ===
- The Range Burial (late 1950s), based on his 1963 painting of the same name
- Trail Boss (1958), bronze, part of the collection of the Smithsonian American Art Museum
- Bronc Stomper (1959), bronze
- The Stampede, or simply Stampede (1959), based on his 1965 painting of the same name
- Lone Hand (1961), bronze
- Cowboy's Meditation, or Cowboy Meditation (1964)
- Where the Trail Forks (1964), bronze, part of the collection of the Smithsonian American Art Museum
- Gunsil, or The Gunsil (1964 or 1966), patinated bronze
- Iroquois Guide (1967), polychrome bronze
- Pony Express (1967), polychrome bronze, and Pony Express (1969), patinated bronze
- Trapper Study (1968), bronze
- The Marshal, or The Marshal (John Wayne as Rooster Cogburn) (1969–1970), painted bronze, part of the collection of the Metropolitan Museum of Art
- Trapper (1970), bronze
- Algonquin Chief, bronze
- Algonquin Chief and Warrior (1971), bronze
- Algonquin Chief Bust (1971), patinated bronze
- Algonquin Chief and Warrior (1971)
- Two Champs (1974) and Two Champs, Five Foot, patinated bronze
- Two Champs II (1977), bronze
- Chief Washakie – First Working Model (1978), bronze
- Marshall II (1979), bronze and Marshall III, polychromed bronze
- Pony Express III (1979), painted bronze
- Sacagawea, Study for a Monument (1979), bronze with brown patina
- Sacajawea, First Working Model for a Monument (1979), bronze
- Pony Express II (1980), patinated bronze, part of the Art in Embassies Program
- In the Wind, or In the Wind (Sacagawea) (1980)
- Iroquois Guide II (1980), polychrome bronze
- Sacagawea (1980), painted bronze, part of the collection of the Buffalo Bill Center of the West
- Sacagawea II (1980), polychrome bronze and Sacajawea II (1980), polychromed bronze
- The Horseman, or John Wayne: The Horseman (1984), bronze equestrian statue depicting John Wayne, installed at the Great Western Savings & Loan building (now Flynt Building) along Wilshire Boulevard, Beverly Hills
- Foreman (1981), painted bronze
- John Wayne: First Unfinished Model for Monument (1981), bronze
- Ol' Sabertooth (1981)
- Ropin' a Star (1982), bronze
- Safe and Sound (1982), bronze, and Safe and Sound (1982), polychrome bronze
- Trapper II (1982), bronze
- Dog Soldier (1983), bronze, and Dog Soldier (1985), bronze, sold for $15,000 in 2011
- The Flag Bearer, or The Flagbearer, polychrome bronze, or Flagbearer (1983)
- Safe and Sound Blizzard (1983), painted bronze
- Washakie II Sunset (1986), painted bronze
- Dog Soldier II (1991), painted bronze
- The Victor (1991), polychrome bronze
- The Flag Bearer II (1992)
- Cosmos (1996–1997), bronze, egg tempera
- Sacajawea Modified II (2005)
