= Nadine Epstein =

American journalist

- Born: Nadine Deborah Epstein; Deal, New Jersey, U.S.
- Education: University of Pennsylvania.
- Occupations: Journalist, writer, editor-in-chief of Moment Magazine
- Notable credit(s): The New York Times, The Washington Post, The New York Times Magazine, Slate
- Website: https://www.momentmag.com/author/nepstein/

Nadine Epstein is an American journalist and author.

== Career ==
She is the editor-in-chief and CEO of Moment magazine. She also is founder and executive director of the Center for Creative Change. Epstein frequently writes and speaks on a variety of topics including American Jewry, antisemitism and Israel. She founded Moment's Daniel Pearl Investigative Journalism Initiative, which honors the memory of Daniel Pearl, an American Jewish journalist slain by terrorists in Pakistan, and was created for young journalists to write on antisemitism and other prejudices globally.

Epstein previously was a full-time stringer at the Chicago bureau for The New York Times and a general assignment reporter at The City News Bureau of Chicago. She was a 1990 Knight-Walker Fellow at the University of Michigan, Ann Arbor, where she later taught science and feature writing for the Master of Journalism program.

== Books ==
Epstein is the author of several books. Most recently, in collaboration with the late Justice Ruth Bader Ginsburg, she wrote RBG's Brave & Brilliant Women: 33 Jewish Women to Inspire Everyone (Random House, 2021) with the introduction and selection by Justice Ginsburg. With Rosita Arvigo, she co-wrote Spiritual Bathing: Healing Rituals and Traditions from Around the World (Echo Point Books & Media, 2018), exploring religious and spiritual traditions since ancient times, and Rainforest Home Remedies: The Maya Way To Heal Your Body and Replenish Your Soul (HarperCollins, 2001), focusing on natural remedies used by the Mayan. She has contributed to anthologies including "The Late Great Mexican Border"(Cinco Puntos Press, 1996) and "Racing in the Street: The Bruce Springsteen Reader" (Penguin Books, 2004). Epstein also edited Elie Wiesel, An Extraordinary Life and Legacy: Writings, Photographs and Reflections, which brought together Wiesel's friends, colleagues, and mentees who shared their memories of Wiesel. Contributors to the book include Ben Kingsley, Oprah Winfrey, and Rabbi Lord Jonathan Sacks.

== Awards ==
For her profile of The Beatles' manager Brian Epstein (no relation to author), Epstein was awarded 'The David Frank Award for Excellence in Personality Profiles' by the American Jewish Press Association in 2013.
