= Carol Brown Goldberg =

American artist

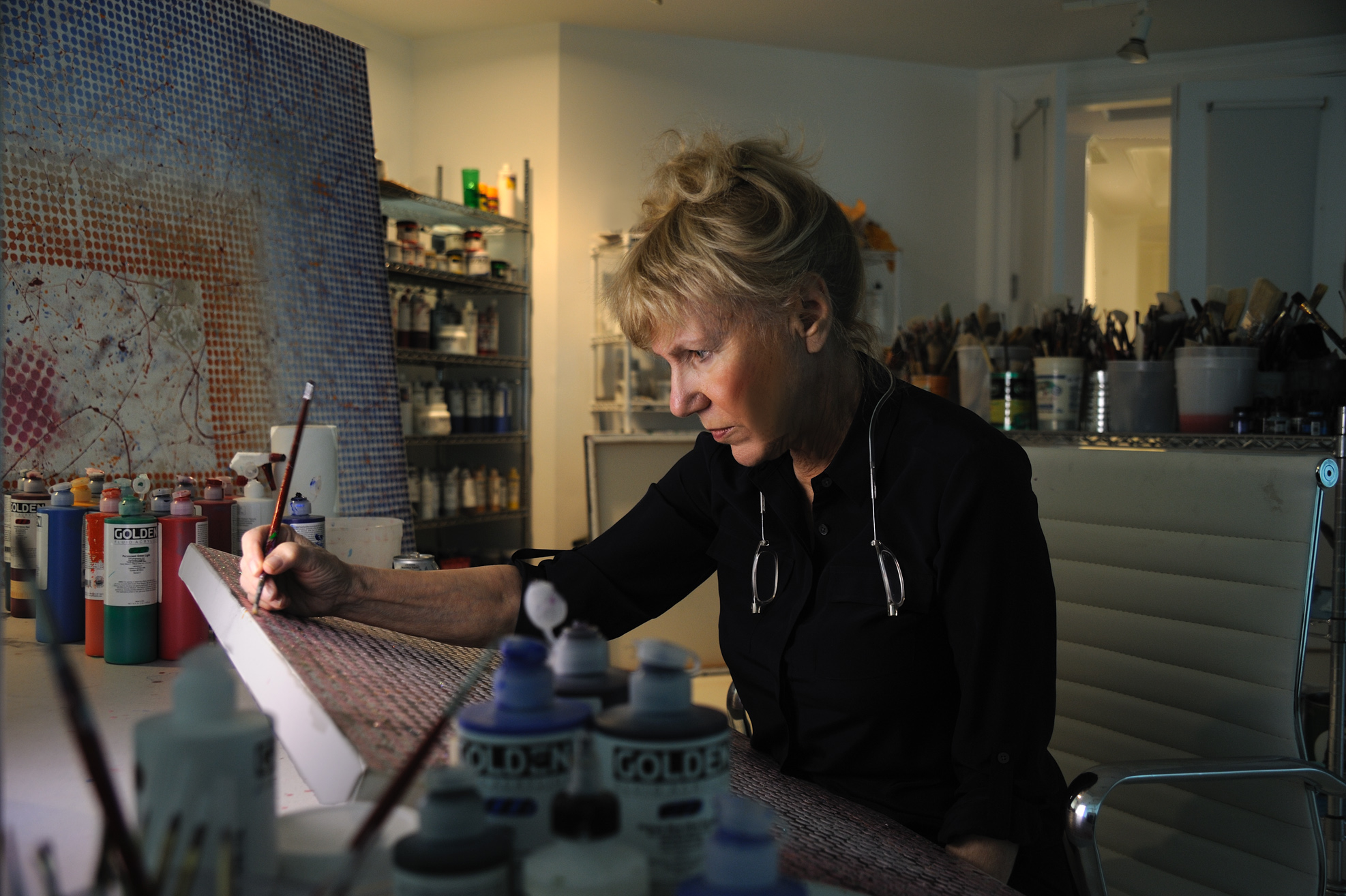
Carol Brown Goldberg in her studio (2013)

Carol Brown Goldberg (born 1940) is an American artist working in a variety of media. While primarily a painter creating heavily detailed work as large as 10 feet by 10 feet, she is also known for sculpture, film, and drawing. Her work has ranged from narrative genre paintings to multi-layered abstractions to realistic portraits to intricate gardens and jungles.

Of the latter work, in 2018 Robert S. Mattison wrote, "Over the past two years, Carol Brown Goldberg has created an extraordinary body of new work: the series Entanglement. On the one hand, these complex and stunningly beautiful paintings and drawings embody Goldberg's profound meditations on the creative process and the origins of art-making. On the other, they personify the artist's intuitive feeling for the biological world, as well as her continuing investigations of the advanced sciences of our age. These large paintings and smaller drawings propose a procreative and fecund connectedness between nature's forces and artistic activity." Mattison is the Marshall R. Metzgar Professor of Art History at Lafayette College.

Carol Brown Goldberg is represented by Addison/Ripley Fine Art in Washington, D.C., and by C. Grimaldis Gallery in Baltimore, MD.

== Early life and education ==
Carol Brown Goldberg was born in Baltimore, Maryland. She received a B.A. in American Studies from the University of Maryland, then moved to Washington, D.C., and further

Her first group exhibition was at the Washington Project for the Arts (WPA) Options Exhibition for Emerging Artists. This was soon followed by her first solo exhibition at the Osuna Gallery. She remained with Osuna until 2011.

== Career ==
Carol Brown Goldberg's work has been described as "intricate works of science and nature, windows into imagined cosmos, explosions of symbols and letters, and wobbly story book scenes," as well as "a carnival of color, form and motion, with each painting revealing different elements depending on where in the room you stand to view it."

Writes Jack Rasmussen, director and curator of the American University Museum at the Katzen Arts Center in Washington, D.C., "Carol is deeply and tirelessly engaged in the pursuit of her muse. She is busy painting, sculpting, drawing, printing, photographing, filming, videotaping, and writing. Her art spans the legacy of the Washington Color School and the figurative tradition of American University, where she taught for many years. She has the hand of a Victorian engraver, the wit and pathos of Dada, and the physical gesture of Post-Impressionists and Abstract Expressionists. Throw in some Pop and Op and you still have not satisfactorily described her gifts or her influences, for she is as influenced by physicists, astronomers, neuroscientists, neurobiologists as she is by artists or movements."

In 2018, Carol Brown Goldberg was honored by Moment Magazine as "visionary artist" alongside Ruth Bader Ginsburg and Jane Mayer as part of the Year of the Woman.

She has taught at American University and University of Maryland, was Artist in Residence at Chautauqua Institute, and is a recipient of the Maryland State Arts Award.

She has served on the board of The Phillips Collection in Washington, D.C., and on the Collector's Committee of the Reading Public Museum.

=== Exhibitions ===
Brown Goldberg's work has been the subject of multiple solo and group exhibitions at museums and galleries in the United States as well as in Paris, Berlin, Moscow, Monterrey, Mexico and Mexico City.

In Washington, D.C., CBG's solo exhibits span from The Phillips Collection (where she was paired with Henri Matisse), to Addison/Ripley Fine Art and the Washington County Museum of Fine Art. Other solo exhibits include The Frost Art Museum in Miami, Florida, C. Grimaldis Gallery in Baltimore, MD, and on Martha's Vineyard, MA, at the Martha's Vineyard Playhouse, Chilmark Public Library, and Featherstone Center for the Arts.

From 2014 to 2016 her paintings and sculpture were on tour, appearing in the Vero Beach Museum of Art, Vero Beach, Florida, the Foosaner Art Museum in Melbourne, Florida, the South Dakota Art Museum in Brookings, South Dakota, and the Lake Charles Cultural Center in Lake Charles, Louisiana. In 2021 she was chosen to be one of 12 Mid-Atlantic women abstract artists in the exhibition Fields and Formations, organized by Kristen Hileman.

In addition to the museums and institutions holding her work (listed below), CBG's sculptures are part of permanent outdoor exhibits at Reading Public Museum in Reading, Pennsylvania; Johns Hopkins University Hospital in Baltimore, Maryland; The Chautauqua Institute in Chautauqua, New York; Montclair State University in Montclair, New Jersey; in DC at American University; George Washington University, the Kreeger Museum, and Martha's Table; and in Spain at the Medina del Campo Sculpture Park.

=== Projects ===
Special projects include a work celebrating the Black Student Fund's 25th anniversary in 1989, The Poetry of Justice for Amnesty International's Human Rights Day in 1990, and in 1996, Solar Night for the Bosnian Human Rights Group of Oxford, England to encourage women's entrepreneurship in Bosnia.

Additional notable projects include the 38-foot photographic mural on permanent display at the Katzen Arts Center at American University; Washington, D.C., in 2016, called "The Studio: A Place of Transformation, and a 22 × 6–foot wall mural in collaboration with students, faculty, and staff at Florida International University in 2017.

CBG produced two movies exploring the relationship between art and memory, the 1993 film, Concertina, which received the AMANA Award, and the 2013 eleven-minute film, The Color of Time. See below for recognition.

== Connecting art and science ==
In the late 1980s, CBG began examining the relationships between art and science, leading to a 14-part lecture series, "Voices of Our Time," CBG produced and curated in 1990 and 1991 at the Strathmore Hall Arts Center in Bethesda, Maryland. Expanding on this relationship, her work has been exhibited at the American Center for Physics, and other science related institutions. Science is often reflected in her work and are included in her lectures and talks.

In 2012, she and neuroscientist Dr. Partha Mitra, participated in Fré Ilgen's panel discussion, Checkpoint Ilgen #9, in Berlin, Germany, focused on creativity and the brain.

This focus continues to illuminate CBG's work, as art critic and poet Donald Kuspit writes in an International Arts and Artists' volume on the artist. "Goldberg's new abstract paintings are scientifically grounded, indicating that spiritual consciousness is not a groping toward the unknown—blindly mystical as it were—but enlightened cognition of scientifically known reality. If science is mysticism satisfied—what seems beyond comprehension made comprehensible—then Goldberg's abstract paintings show that the seemingly mystical, incomprehensible implicate order is scientifically comprehensible."

== Books ==
- 2007, "Carol Brown Goldberg Catalog”
- 2011, "Painting & Sculpture”
- 2014, "Recent Works”
- 2018, "Entanglement"
- 2019, "Mirror Universe: Recent Works by Carol Brown Goldberg”

== Awards and honors ==
- 2020 "Distinguished Terrapin Award," The University of Maryland College of Arts and Humanities; College Park, Maryland
- 2019 "Transformer 16th Annual Silent Auction," Corcoran School of Art and Design; Washington, D.C.
- 2019 "Daryl Reich Rubenstein Award," Sidwell Friends School; Washington, D.C.
- 2018 "Year of the Woman" Gala Honoree, Moment Magazine; Washington, D.C.
- 2016 Juror's Award, "Making Sense: See, Smell, Hear, Taste, Touch," McLean Project for the Arts; McLean, Virginia
- 2014 The Color of Time film presented in short film festivals in Hudson Valley, and Warwick, NY as well as ShortD3:F9 Film Selection, YouTube
- 2013 Third Prize; International Sculpture Competition; Parque de Levante; Murcia, Spain
- 2013 FilmColumbia 2013; The Color of Time
- 2012 Best Experimental Film; London Film Awards; The Color of Time
- 2012 Award of Excellence, La Jolla Short Film Festival; Best Shorts Competition; The Color of Time
- 2010 Maryland State Arts Council: Individual Artist Award; Baltimore, Maryland
- 1994 AMANA Award; "Concertina"; video
- 1987 Outdoor Sculpture Honorariums: City of Rockville; Rockville, MD and Martin Luther King Park; Montgomery County, Maryland
- 1976 Eugene M. Weisz Memorial Award; Corcoran School of Art; Washington, D.C.

== Selected collections ==
- National Museum of Women in the Arts; Washington, D.C.
- George Washington University; Washington, D.C.
- American University; Washington, D.C.
- The Kreeger Museum; Washington, D.C.
- The Gabarrón Foundation Museum; Valladolid, Spain
- National Institutes of Health; Bethesda, Maryland
- Amnesty International; Washington, D.C.
- University of Maryland; College Park, Maryland
- New Orleans Museum of Art; New Orleans, Louisiana
- The Frances Lehman Loeb Art Center; Vassar College; Poughkeepsie, New York
- Fannie Mae Organization; Washington, D.C.
- Art in Embassy Program
- DC Commission on the Arts and Humanities; Art Bank 2006, 2009; Washington, D.C.
- South Dakota Art Museum; Brookings, South Dakota
- Vero Beach Museum of Art; Vero Beach, Florida
- ArtBank; Washington, D.C.
- Reading Public Museum; Reading, Pennsylvania
- Academy Art Museum; Easton, Maryland
- The Suzanne H. Arnold Gallery; Lebanon Valley College; Annville, Pennsylvania
- Museum of Arts and Sciences; Daytona Beach, Florida
- Deland Museum of Art; Deland, Florida
- Foosaner Art Museum (formerly Brevard Art Center and Museum); Melbourne, Florida
- Museum of the University of Central Florida; Orlando, Florida

== Exhibitions ==
=== Selected solo exhibitions ===
- 2022 "...On the Other Hand"at The Chilmark Library; Washington, D.C.
- 2021 "...On the Other Hand" Addison/Ripley Fine Art; Washington, D.C.
- 2020 "Entanglement" C. Grimaldis Gallery, Baltimore, Maryland
- 2019 "Mirror Universe" Martha's Vineyard Playhouse; Vineyard Haven, Maryland
- 2019 "Summer Selections" Addison/Ripley Fine Art; Washington, D.C..
- 2018 "Carol Brown Goldberg: Recent Works" Mirror Universe: Recent Works by Carol Brown GoldbergHagerstown, Maryland
- 2018 "Carol Brown Goldberg: Extravagant Eden" Chilmark Public Library; Chilmark, Massachusetts
- 2018 "Carol Brown Goldberg: Entanglement" Featherstone Center for the Arts; Oak Bluffs, Maryland
- 2018 "Entanglement" Katzen Arts Center at American University; Washington, D.C.
- 2018 "Carol Brown Goldberg: Recent Works" Katzen Arts Center at American University; Washington, D.C.
- 2017 "Tangled Nature" Frost Art Museum; Miami, Florida
- 2016 "Extravagant Edens" Addison Ripley Fine Art; Washington, D.C.
- 2016 "Carol Brown Goldberg: Recent Works" Lake Charles Cultural Center, Lake Charles, Louisiana
- 2015 "Carol Brown Goldberg" A Gallery; Oak Bluffs, Maryland
- 2015 "One on One: Carol Brown Goldberg/ Henri Matisse" The Phillips Collection: curator, Klaus Ottmann; Washington, D.C.
- 2015 "Carol Brown Goldberg: Recent Works" South Dakota Art Museum; Brookings, South Dakota
- 2015 "Carol Brown Goldberg: The Color of Time" Denise Bibro Fine Art, New York, New York
- 2014 "Carol Brown Goldberg: Recent Works" Vero Beach Museum of Art; Vero Beach, Florida
- 2014 "Carol Brown Goldberg: Recent Sculpture" Foosaner Art Museum; Melbourne, Florida
- 2014 "Carol Brown Goldberg: Sculpture" Cosmos Club; Washington, D.C.
- 2013 "The Circle of Time" Reading Public Museum; Reading, Pennsylvania
- 2013 "Color in Space" David Richard Gallery; Sante Fe, Nwe Mexico
- 2012 Art Santa Fe; Osuna Art; Santa Fe, New Mexico
- 2012 Katzen Art Center at American University; Washington, D.C.
- 2012 "Flow and Fluctuation" American Center for Physics; College Park, Maryland
- 2012 "Abstract Realities" The Gabarrón Foundation, New York, New York
- 2012 "Sculpture and Works on Paper" Luther Brady Gallery, George Washington University; Washington, D.C.;
- 2011 & 2012 Addison/Ripley Fine Art; Washington, D.C.
- 2011 "Painting and Sculpture" George Segal Gallery, Montclair State University; Montclair, New Jersey
- 2010 Fundación Sebastian A.C.; Mexico City, Mexico
- 2010 The Suzanne H. Arnold Gallery; Lebanon Valley College; Annville, Pennsylvania
- 2010 Galería Emma Molina; Monterrey, Mexico
- 2009 Centro de las Artes CONARTE Museum; Monterrey, Mexico
- 2009 Osuna Gallery; Washington, D.C.
- 2009 Casa de Vacas, Buen Retiro Park; Madrid, Spain
- 2009 Sala de Exposiciones Molinos de Río; Murcia, Spain
- 2008 The Gabarrón Foundation Museum; Valladolid, Spain
- 2008 The National Arts Club (Gramercy Park); New York, New York
- 2007 Osuna Gallery; Washington, D.C.
- 2007 American University, Katzen Arts Center; Washington, D.C.
- 2006 Pyramid Atlantic Gallery; Silver Spring, Maryland
- 2005 Art Santa Fe; Osuna Art; Santa Fe, New Mexico
- 2005 Osuna Art; Washington, D.C.
- 2004 Cosmos Club; Washington, D.C.
- 2003 The John and Esther Clay Fine Arts Gallery; Cheyenne, Wyoming
- 2002 Chautauqua Institute; Chautauqua, New York
- 2002 Anton Gallery; Washington, D.C.
- 2000 Cosmos Club; Washington, D.C.
- 1996 Compass Bank; Chilmark, Massachusetts
- 1995 APA; Washington, D.C.
- 1995 Troyer Fitzpatrick Lassman Gallery; Washington, D.C.
- 1995 Art Santa Fe; Osuna Gallery; Santa Fe, New Mexico
- 1993 "Concertina" (Multi-Media); Maryland Art Place, Baltimore, Maryland
- 1992 Osuna Gallery; Washington, D.C.
- 1990 Amnesty International; Peat Marwick Main & Company; Washington, D.C.
- 1987 -1990 Osuna Gallery; Washington, D.C.
- 1987 Virginia Polytechnic Institute; Squires Gallery; Blacksburg, Virginia
- 1986 Strathmore Hall Arts Center; Rockville, Maryland
- 1986 Osuna Gallery; Washington, D.C.
- 1985 The G. Sander Gallery; Daytona Beach, Florida
- 1983 FIAC Grand Palais; Osuna Gallery; Paris, France
- 1982 Washington Hebrew Congregation; Washington, D C
- 1982 Osuna Gallery; Washington, D.C.

=== Selected group exhibitions ===
- 2022 Art Miami, C. Grimaldis Gallery
- 2022 Summer '22 exhibition at C. Grimaldis Gallery; Baltimore, Maryland
- 2022 Fields and Formations at The Delaware Contemporary / AU Katzen
- 2021 Objects from the Studio: The Sculptor's Process at The Kreeger Museum; Washington, D.C.
- 2021 Pink Rings on view in the exhibition Fleeting, Fled at Glen Echo Park; Glen Echo, Maryland
- 2021 "The Long Sixties" Katzen Arts Center at American University; Washington, D.C.
- 2021 "Fleeting, Fled" Glen Echo Park; Glen Echo, Maryland
- 2020 ARTINA 2020: LIGHT: A Sculptural Solar Dance exhibition at Sandy Spring Museum; Sandy Spring, Maryland
- 2020 "Women and Nature" Maryland State Arts Council Virtual Juried Exhibition
- 2020 "Summer '20," C. Grimaldis Gallery; Baltimore, Maryland
- 2020 ARTINA 2020, "LIGHT: A Sculptural Solar Dance," Sandy Spring Museum; Sandy Spring, Maryland
- 2020 "Celebrating 100 Years of Women Artists," Washington County Museum of Fine Arts; Hagerstown, Maryland
- 2020 "Objects from the Studio: The Sculptor's Process," The Kreeger Museum; Washington, D.C.
- 2019 "The Feminine Sublime," Georges Berges Gallery; New York, New York Curated by Donald Kuspit
- 2018 "Recollection: Celebrating 15 Years of Exhibitions at BlackRock Center for the Arts" BlackRock Center for the Arts; Germantown, Maryland
- 2018 "Full Circle: Hue and Saturation in the Washington Color Schoo," The Luther W. Brady Art Gallery at George Washington University; DC
- 2018 "Another Dimension," Nano Gallery at the District of Columbia Arts Center; curators, Philip Barlow and Chandi Kelley; Washington, D.C.
- 2017 "Being Sentient/Sentient Being." 18th Annual Wills Creek Exhibition at Allegany Arts Council; juror, Aneta Georgievksa-Shine; Cumberland, Maryland
- 2017 "Drawn From: 15 Years of Exhibitions at the Luther W. Brady Art Gallery" The Luther W. Brady Art Gallery at George Washington University; DC
- 2016 "MAP 35th Anniversary Exhibition" Maryland Art Place, Baltimore, Maryland
- 2016 "Making Sense: See, Smell, Hear, Taste, Touch," McLean Project for the Arts; juror, Nora Atkinson; McLean, Virginia
- 2015 "Micro-Monuments" from the Washington Sculptors Grou, Salzlandmuseum; Schönebeck, Germany and the Center for Hellenic Studies; DC.
- 2015 "Rain or Shine: Art in Nature, Nature in Ar," The Luther W. Brady Art Gallery at George Washington University; Washington, D.C.
- 2015 "Cosmos at the Cosmos," The Cosmos Club; curator, Lenore Miller: Washington, D.C.
- 2014 "Sculpture Now 2014 – 30th Anniversary, Wash. Sculptors Group" Katzen Arts Center at American University, curator: Jack Rasmussen; DC
- 2014 "Survival" Cosmos Club, Washington, D.C.
- 2014 "Washington Color Abstraction" The Gabarron Foundation; curator, Donald Kuspit; New York, New York
- 2013 "Washington Art Matters" Katzen Arts Center at American University; Washington, D.C.
- 2013 & '15 "Alchemical Vessels" Smith Center for Healing and the Arts; Washington, D.C.
- 2012 "Signals" DC Arts Center; curator: J.W. Mahoney; Washington, D.C.
- 2012-'13 "Fall for the Arts" Katzen Arts Center at American University; Washington, D.C.
- 2012 "Select 2012" Washington Project for the Arts; Washington, D.C.
- 2011 National Museum of Women in the Arts; Washington, D.C.
- 2011 "Catalyst" Washington Project for the Arts, American University; curator: J.W. Mahoney; Washington, D.C.
- 2010 Juried "Call for Artists Show" BlackRock Center for the Arts; Germantown, Maryland
- 2010 "Gaps" Greater Reston Art Center; curator: Vesela Sretenovic, Reston, Virginia
- 2010 "Cream" Washington Project for the Arts; curator: Mera Rubbell, The American University; Washington, D.C.
- 2008 "Personal Geometry" Emerson Gallery; Mclean, Virginia
- 2007 "Washington Women in the Arts: A Selection" Osuna Gallery; Washington, D.C.
- 2006 "On the Verge" American Center for Physics; College Park, Maryland
- 2006 "Pulse 2006" Hillyer Art Space; Washington, D.C.
- 2005 "Faces of the Fallen" Women's Military Museum; Arlington, Virginia
- 2002-'04 Chautauqua Institute; Chautauqua, New York
- 2002 "Math=Art" Frostburg College; Frostburg, Maryland
- 2001-'02 Anton Gallery; Washington, D.C.
- 2000 American University; Vaughn Associate; New York, New York
- 1999 "International Visions" Artists for Amnesty International; Washington, D.C.
- 1999 Emerson Gallery; McLean, Virginia
- 1997 "Flowers" Osuna Gallery; Washington, D.C.
- 1997 Maryland Art Place; Baltimore, Maryland
- 1995 "Three Visions" Washington Project for the Arts; Washington, D.C.
- 1995 "Artist to Artist" Rock Creek Gallery; Washington, D.C.
- 1995 AFTA: Embassy of Federal Republic of Germany; Washington, D.C.
- 1995 "Collaboration at its Best" George Mason University; Fairfax, Virginia
- 1995 "Portraits" George Washington University; Washington, D.C.
- 1995 "Prints 1995" Baltimore Museum of Art; Baltimore, Maryland
- 1984 '94 Auction; Washington Project for the Arts; Washington, D.C.
- 1994 A New Nature" Emerson Gallery; McLean, Virginia
- 1993 "NNDG" Emerson Gallery; McLean, Virginia
- 1992 St. John's College; Collegeville, Minnesota
- 1992 "Alumni" Corcoran Gallery of Art; Washington, D.C.
- 1992 "WPA Show" Corcoran Gallery of Art; Washington, D.C.
- 1991 "The Critic's Choice" Watkins Gallery, The American University; Washington, D.C.
- 1991 "Collector's Favorites" RAP; Rockville, Maryland
- 1991 "Washington Print Show" Brody Gallery/Gallery K; Washington, D.C.
- 1990 "Moscow/Washington, D.C. Exchange" Moscow, USSR
- 1990 "Art Against Aids" Washington Projects Arts; Washington, D.C.
- 1990 "Metaphoric Messages" Strathmore Hall Arts Center; Rockville, Maryland
- 1990 Rockville Arts Place; Rockville, Maryland
- 1988 "Four Sculptors" Washington Square; Washington, D.C.
- 1987 "Paintings and Sculptures" Osuna Gallery; Washington, D.C.
- 1987 "Figurative Show" Washington Square; Washington, D.C.
- 1986 Driscoll Gallery; Denver, Colorado
- 1986 "Art and Function" Painted sculpture; Washington Square; Washington, D.C.
- 1986 "Select Sculpture" G. Sander Fine Art Gallery; Daytona Beach, Florida
- 1986 "Disquieting Figure" Osuna Gallery; Washington, D.C.
- 1986 "Garden of Earthly Delights" Gallery Ten; Washington, D.C.
- 1985 "Artists' Self Portrait" Jane Haslem Gallery; Washington, D.C.
- 1985 "The Washington Show" Corcoran Gallery of Art; Washington, D.C.
- 1984 "Washington Galleries" Strathmore Hall Arts Center; Washington, D.C.
- 1982 "Summer Exhibit" Osuna Gallery; Washington, D.C.
- 1981 "Hanover Place" Osuna Gallery; Washington, D.C.
- 1981 "OPTIONS '81" Washington Project for the Arts; Washington, D.C.
- 1977 "Summertime" Pyramid Gallery; Washington, D.C.
- 1976 "Summer Exhibit" Pyramid Gallery; Washington, D.C.

== External links and selected media ==
- Carol Brown Goldberg: Recent Works
- Carol Brown Goldberg
- Sitting in Uncertainty: Fields and Formations at the Katzen Arts Center: https://bmoreart.com/2022/05/sitting-in-uncertainty.html
- https://www.washingtonpost.com/arts-entertainment/2022/03/02/american-university-museum-positive-fragmentation-fields-and-formations/
- https://www.theartblog.org/2021/12/powerful-show-of-art-by-women-and-non-binary-artists-working-in-the-region-today-at-the-delaware-contemporary/
- https://www.washingtonpost.com/entertainment/museums/art-gallery-shows-dc-region/2021/05/06/659ee1aa-ac4e-11eb-ab4c-986555a1c511_story.html
- Interview: https://sites.google.com/terpmail.umd.edu/umd-art-history-museum-world/artists/carol-brown-goldberg?authuser=0&pli=1
- https://www.mvtimes.com/2018/08/15/carol-brown-goldberg-unearths-world-foliage/
- Donald Kuspit on Entanglements: https://whitehotmagazine.com/articles/brown-goldberg-s-entanglement-series/3942
- https://vineyardgazette.com/news/2017/08/03/finding-herself-through-art-guided-intuition
- https://www.artfixdaily.com/artwire/release/7123-frost-museum-exhibition-explores-the-metaphysical-relationship-be
- https://www.sciartmagazine.com/blog/review-tangled-nature-at-the-frost-art-museum
- https://newsarchives.fiu.edu/2017/03/frost-super-murals-a-collaboration-of-hundreds
- https://gwtoday.gwu.edu/artist-creates-outdoor-sculpture-university
- https://patch.com/new-jersey/montclair/the-cosmic-everyday-carol-brown-goldberg-painting-sculpture
- https://vlex.com.mx/vid/guadalupe-loaeza-caos-belleza-80694843
- https://www.abc.es/espana/madrid/abci-opcion-bello-200908080300-923177295158_noticia.html
- https://www.elnortedecastilla.es/20081008/cultura/orden-musical-20081008.html
- https://www.washingtonpost.com/archive/lifestyle/1992/02/08/galleries/4a463fcd-fe07-42b6-972d-34f3ece03f30
- https://www.washingtonpost.com/archive/lifestyle/1982/04/29/carol-goldberg-outlines/f11d3f47-fb19-4c94-8fc4-d1a349d8518b
