= Religion News Association =

American professional association (1949-)

The Religion News Association (RNA), formerly the Religion Newswriters Association, is an American non-profit professional association which seeks to promote better reporting on religion in the news media and to provide help and support to journalists who cover religion.

== History ==
The RNA was founded in 1949 and in 2007 had 570 members and subscribers. Membership in the RNA is open to journalists who regularly report on religion in the secular print and broadcast media. Since 2006, the RNA has been associated with the Missouri School of Journalism at the University of Missouri in Columbia, Missouri. In 2016, RNA members approved a proposal to change the name from the "Religion Newswriters Association" to the current name.

RNA awards scholarships for full-time journalists who wish to take college courses on religion, gives awards and scholarships to college journalists, sponsors seminars and conferences, and publishes a primer for religion reporters and an online style guide, as well as other resources for journalists. RNA is funded by membership dues, donations, and Religion News Foundation support.

In 1999, former RNA executive director Debra Mason said in an interview that the topic of religion is very complex and requires extensive research, something which newspaper editors don't always appreciate. In 2005, Steve Buttry writing at Poynter Online said, "The Religion Newswriters Association does a tremendous job helping reporters learn the beat." RNA was cited by Kenneth G. C. Newport and Crawford Gribben in their 2006 book Expecting the End: Millennialism in Social and Historical Context for helping reporters get in touch with credentialed scholars on religion, leading to better public understanding of religious issues.

Since the 1970s, RNA has published an annual list of the top ten religion-related news stories of the previous year. In 1999, RNA was criticized by the Islamic organization the Wisdom Fund for listing a story on a special "Top 10 Stories of The Millennium" list which gave inaccurate information on the history of Islam in India. In the same year, RNA also published a list of the top ten religious news stories of the Twentieth century, with the Holocaust being the most important event.

In 2006, representatives from the Church of Jesus Christ of Latter-day Saints and the Church of Scientology spoke to the annual RNA conference and discussed issues concerning their respective faiths.
