= Challah for Hunger =

American Jewish student hunger-relief organization

- Formation: October 1, 2004
- Type: Nonprofit organization
- Headquarters: Philadelphia, Pennsylvania, United States (program now operated by MAZON)
- Key people: Eli Winkelman (founder)
- Website: challahforhunger.org

Challah for Hunger is an American nonprofit organization that mobilizes college students to bake and sell challah bread, donating the proceeds to hunger relief organizations. Founded in 2004 at Scripps College in Claremont, California, it grew into a national network of more than 80 campus chapters across the United States, Canada, the United Kingdom, and Australia. Since 2004, Challah for Hunger chapters have raised more than $2 million for anti-hunger organizations. The organization is currently operated as a program of MAZON: A Jewish Response to Hunger.

== Founding ==
Challah for Hunger was founded in October 2004 by Eli Winkelman, then a first-year student at Scripps College. Winkelman began baking challah with friends as a way to connect with Jewish traditions and her community. When other students kept returning and buying the bread, she recognized an opportunity. "Something clicked," she later wrote. "People liked learning to bake challah; others wanted to buy the loaves." The group began donating proceeds from challah sales to social justice causes. The first chapter spread by word of mouth to the University of Texas, then UCLA, and eventually to campuses worldwide.

The organization became a registered 501(c)(3) nonprofit in 2009 and relocated its headquarters to Philadelphia in 2013.

== Model ==
Each Challah for Hunger chapter operates independently, baking and selling challah on a regular basis and donating proceeds to hunger relief. Half of each chapter's proceeds go to MAZON, a national Jewish hunger relief organization, with the other half going to a local hunger relief partner of the chapter's choosing. Chapters also engage in educational programming on food insecurity and participate in national advocacy campaigns.

Roughly 25 percent of participants identify as non-Jewish, reflecting the organization's explicitly cross-cultural approach to Jewish tradition.

== Recognition ==
Challah for Hunger received national recognition when Bill Clinton cited founder Eli Winkelman's work at the Clinton Global Initiative, describing it as "Jewish girls breaking Jewish bread saving Muslim kids' lives in Africa that have been overlooked by other people." The organization was also featured in Clinton's book Giving: How Each of Us Can Change the World.

The original Challah for Hunger sales at Scripps raised money for Sudanese refugees affected by the Darfur genocide.

Winkelman was a Joshua Venture Fellow, an alumna of the PresenTense Global Summer Institute, and a member of the ROI Community from 2007. Challah for Hunger had been founded three years before Winkelman's participation in the PresenTense program. She also served as staff at the Jewlicious Festival.

Challah for Hunger was listed in the Slingshot Fund's annual guide to innovative Jewish organizations.

== Leadership transition ==
Winkelman served as the organization's chief executive, using the title "Challah Enthusiasm Officer," for nine years before transitioning to the board in 2013.

== Rebrand as Nazun and dissolution ==
In January 2022, the organization rebranded as Nazun, a Hebrew word meaning "we will nourish," to reflect an expanded mission beyond challah baking into leadership development, advocacy, and community building. The rebrand was driven by feedback from students that the Challah for Hunger name did not fully capture the scope of the organization's work.

In August 2023, Nazun approached MAZON: A Jewish Response to Hunger about absorbing its flagship Challah for Hunger program, citing the organization's difficulty sustaining itself as an independent nonprofit. MAZON agreed, and the arrangement took effect on August 4, 2023. Nazun dissolved as an independent organization, transferring the Challah for Hunger program, its trademarks, and the Nazun name to MAZON. The program reverted to the Challah for Hunger name under MAZON's stewardship.

== See also ==
- MAZON: A Jewish Response to Hunger
- PresenTense Group
- Tikkun olam
- Tzedakah
- Scripps College
