= Robert Mattison =

Robert S. Mattison
- Education: Middlebury College (BA); Williams College (MA); Princeton University (MFA, PhD)
- Known for: Studies on Abstract Expressionism, Robert Motherwell, Grace Hartigan, and Franz Kline
- Scientific career
- Fields: Art history
- Workplaces: Lafayette College
- Thesis: The Art of Robert Motherwell during the 1940s (1985)

Robert S. Mattison is an American academic, art historian, curator, and author who is the Marshall R. Metzger Emeritus professor of art history at Lafayette College in Easton, Pennsylvania. He is known for his authorship on abstract expressionism, especially the painters Robert Motherwell and Franz Kline.

== Biography ==
Mattison earned his BA in art history from Middlebury College in Midddlebury, Vermont and his MA from Williams College in Williamstown, Massachusetts, where he studied with George Heard Hamilton and Julius Held. He received MFA and PhD from Princeton University in Princeton, New Jersey, where he studied with Sam Hunter. Mattison's doctoral dissertation at Princeton became his first book "Robert Motherwell: The Formative Years" (UMI Research Press 1987).

His second book was "Grace Hartigan: A Painter’s World" ([Hudson Hills Press 1990). In 1995, he authored "Masterworks in the Robert and Jane Meyerhoff Collection : Jasper Johns, Roy Lichtenstein, Robert Rauschenberg, Ellsworth Kelly, and Frank Stella. In 2004, this book was followed by "Robert Rauschenberg: Breaking Boundaries" published by Yale University Press. In 2010, Mattison published "Arshile Gorky: Works and Writings" (Ediciones Poligrapha). Subsequently, Mattison wrote the monograph "Ronald Bladen: Sculpture (Abbeville Press, 2019).

Mattison directed and authored the online Catalogue Raisonne "Franz Kline Paintings: 1950-1962" for the Hauser & Wirth Institute. Previous to this, in 2012–13, Mattison curated the exhibition and wrote the catalog for "Franz Kline: Coal and Steel" at the Allentown Art Museum in Allentown, Pennsylvania and Baruch College, New York City.

In 2024 Mattison authored the chapter "Francine Tint: In the Studio” in the volume "Francine Tint Paintings" (Denmark, 2024).
