= Gretchen Schoeninger Corazzo =

American artist (1913–2016)

- Born: 18 December 1913; Highland Park, Illinois, US
- Died: January 11, 2016 (aged 102); Jackson Township, Porter County, Indiana, US
- Known for: Sculpture, assemblages
- Spouse: Alexander Corazzo

Gretchen Schoeninger Corazzo (1913–2016) was an American sculptor and artist.

== Early life and education ==
Corazzo was born on December 18, 1913 in Ravinia, a small community in Highland Park, Illinois, near Chicago. Her artistic talents were encouraged from an early age. Her mother, Hester B. Hall, was a teacher and her father, Joseph Schoeninger, was a businessman who specialised in printing. Her parents moved several times, often to provide more progressive schooling for their children. She attended the Francis W. Parker School (Chicago) and in 1922, she and her siblings boarded at the Heidehoff Schule near Stuttgart in Germany, as their father was negotiating the purchase of a rotogravure printing process. Still in Germany in 1923, the family stayed in the home of Anton Lang, a sculptor and actor who had played the part of Jesus Christ in the decennial Oberammergau Passion Play in 1900, 1910 and 1922. Lang gave her clay to model and she said that from then, "I always had a piece of mud in my hands, making something."

The family returned to Chicago, where her father set up his new printing press and his daughter attended a school in Chicago. In art classes she could do what she wanted and she created large posters of Heracles and other Greek mythological figures. On summer holidays, her mother encouraged her artistic leanings by attaching wallpaper to the walls of the barn for the children to draw on. In 1925 the family moved to Carmel-by-the-Sea, California, an artistic colony where she would meet people such as the author, John Steinbeck, the photographer Edward Weston, the poet Robinson Jeffers, the marine biologist, Ed Ricketts, the avant- garde composer, John Cage and his future wife, also an artist, Xenia Cage. However, despite the attractions of Carmel, her mother was unhappy with the schools and educated her children herself. Her daughter then entered Monterey High School (Monterey, California), where she found the art lessons to be too academic. For a time, she wanted to become a veterinarian.

After leaving high school, Corazzo produced posters for local organizations. She also did the scenic design for a play by the Carmel Arts & Crafts Clubhouse, which was performed in a Los Angeles theatre. In her early twenties she attended the Chouinard Art Institute, but became disillusioned by its commercial approach. She then provided monochrome linocut illustrations for a local newspaper, the Pacific Weekly, published by Lincoln Steffens, who also lived in Carmel. She also worked as a nanny for Jacob Zeitlin, owner of a well-known bookstore in Los Angeles, who was the first person to buy one of her paintings.

She then moved to the Institute of Design at the Illinois Institute of Technology, which took its inspiration from the Bauhaus in Germany, which had been closed by the Nazis, and was sometimes known as the "New Bauhaus." This had been founded by a former Bauhaus instructor and artist László Moholy-Nagy and former Bauhaus student Hin Bredendieck. At the institute she studied woodworking techniques, sculpture, physics, semantics, and photography. Working with clay, she studied sculpture with Alexander Archipenko, the Ukrainian born cubist sculptor. Moholy-Nagy's photography course strengthened her interest in abstraction and shadows and the same teacher also taught her about creating sculptures for the blind.

== Career ==
A fellow student at the Institute was Alexander Corazzo, an abstract painter who had moved to the US from France when he was 20. They married in 1939 and lived on Cermak Road and in Hyde Park. After they left the institute, he became an artist under the Works Progress Administration, one of president Franklin D. Roosevelt's New Deal agencies, while she sculpted in clay, from which she produced plaster casts, at the same time working for a company that produced dioramas for museums. In 1942 they had a joint exhibition at the San Francisco Museum of Modern Art. In 1941, John and Xenia Cage lived with the Corazzos in Chicago and introduced her to Peggy Guggenheim. This led to her being invited to exhibit at the Exhibition by 31 Women held at Guggenheim's Art of This Century gallery in New York. She was one of only three sculptors alongside Xenia Cage and Louise Nevelson.

Her husband joined the army in 1943 and was posted to Burma while she moved back to Carmel, staying with her mother and working as a gardener. This influenced her later work that involved the painting of seeds. On her husband's demobilization they moved back to Chicago. He attended the Illinois Institute of Technology to study architecture, while she continued to create her abstract sculptures. During this period, they were friends with the architect, Ludwig Mies van der Rohe, and his daughter Waltraut, who worked at the Art Institute of Chicago. Corazzo's husband later worked for Mies van der Rohe. After their two daughters were born they moved to a farm in Chesterton, Indiana, which had a thriving artistic community. There she began collecting seeds and creating pictures using these.

Her husband died from a heart attack in 1971. During the following years she took up silk screen printing, in the 1980s returned to sculpture, and also creating assemblages. She used her garden to exhibit, with large abstract works being displayed in the landscape. Her daughters both became artists, with Nina becoming professor of fine art at Valparaiso University in Indiana. That university's Brauer Museum of Art purchased a found-object collage by Corazzo in 1987, and its Christopher Center Gallery exhibited her work in 2007 and 2008. Her photograph, Negative Exposure, was exhibited in 2009 as one of the Art Institute of Chicago's "Modern Treasures," and continues to be held by the institute. In 2017 her work was exhibited, together with that of her husband and two others, at the Ukrainian Institute of Modern Art in Chicago in an exhibition inspired by the "New Bauhaus", called Cubism Collage Cybergrams Concrete: 4 Artists from Moholy-Nagy's School. As well as continuing to create, she also taught children at Michigan City neighborhood centers.

In 2013 a retrospective of her work celebrated her 100th birthday, when she was still working to produce collages. The exhibition was held at the Box Factory for the Arts in St. Joseph, Michigan.

== Death and legacy ==
Corazzo died on January 11, 2016 in Jackson Township, Porter County, Indiana.

John Cage had written poems about her, and also a six-minute piece of music, entitled Alex and Gretchen Corazzo in 1979. Throughout her life, Corazzo had created art in various formats and styles, leaving a legacy of both innovation and of collaboration with other artists. Her works and papers are held at the Art Institute of Chicago.
