= Hedda Sterne =

Romanian-American artist (1910–2011)

- Hedda Sterne 1947 photograph by Margaret Bourke-White
- Born: Hedwig Lindenberg; August 4, 1910; Bucharest, Romania
- Died: April 8, 2011 (aged 100); New York City, U.S.
- Known for: Painting, drawing, printmaking, collage
- Notable work: New York VII (1954); Machine 5 (1950); Third Avenue El (1952–53); New York, N.Y., 1955 (1955); New York (1956); Alaska I (1958)
- Movement: Surrealism and Abstract Expressionism
- Spouses: Friederich Stern (m. 1932; div. 1944) Saul Steinberg (m. 1944; sep. 1960)

Hedda Sterne (August 4, 1910 – April 8, 2011) was a Romanian-born American artist who was an active member of the New York School of painters. Her work is often associated with Abstract Expressionism and Surrealism. She was also the only woman to appear in a notable photograph of abstract expressionist artists dubbed The Irascibles, although the group included other women, and Sterne herself later said she had actually not been an Irascible.

== Early life and education ==
Sterne was born as Hedwig Lindenberg in Bucharest, Romania, on August 4, 1910. She was the daughter of Jewish parents Eugenie (née Wexler) and Simon Lindenberg, a language teacher. Her older brother and only sibling, Edouard Lindenberg (1908–1973), would become a prominent conductor in Paris.

As a young child, Sterne and her brother were educated in music and languages. In addition to Romanian, Sterne was taught to read German, French, and English. She would recall the importance of German philosophy texts and art history books in her development as an artist. Initially encouraged to study piano, Sterne eventually succeeded in convincing her parents to allow her to study art instead. With the encouragement of Max Hermann Maxy, whom Sterne recalled as a student of her father's, she began formal training in 1918. Sterne's first art teacher was Maxy's former professor at the Bucharest National University of Arts, the sculptor Frederic Storck.

In 1919, Sterne's father Simon died and her mother remarried. By 1921, Sterne was attending the Institutul de Domnişoare Choisy-Mangâru, a private girls' school in Bucharest.

In the late 1920s, Sterne traveled regularly to Vienna, where she took classes in ceramics at the Kunsthistorisches Museum. In 1929 she enrolled at the University of Bucharest where she studied art history and philosophy with various notable intellectuals, including Tudor Vianu, Mircea Florian, and Nae Ionescu. In 1932, she married Friederich (Fritz) Stern (1905–1982; later known as Frederick (Fred) Stafford) and discontinued her formal education.

== Early career and Surrealism ==
In addition to her early work in the studio of Frederic Storck, Sterne was one of several young artists in Bucharest working in the studio of Dada-cofounder and Surrealist painter Marcel Janco, who had returned to Bucharest from Switzerland and France in 1921. Sterne became an active member of Bucharest's thriving avant-garde communities of artists and writers, and in this way, as she would recall, she "grew up with Surrealism". Among her closest friends were Constructivist and Surrealist artist Victor Brauner, his brother Théodore Brauner and their family; painters Jules Perahim and Medi Wexler, and Wexler's future husband, the surrealist poet Gheorghe Dinu.

Beginning in the late 1920s and following her marriage to Fritz Stern in 1932, Sterne traveled frequently between Bucharest and Paris, where she studied briefly in the ateliers of Fernand Léger and André Lhote, and at the Académie de la Grande Chaumière. Often reconnecting with Victor Brauner in Paris in the 1930s, Sterne closely followed developments in Surrealism and attended exhibitions. She was particularly drawn to the Surrealist practice of automatism and by the late 1930s had developed her own unique method of constructing automatic collages. Some of these works were included in the Association Artistique Les Surindépendants' 11th Exposition du Salon des Surindépendants at the Porte de Versailles, where they drew the attention of Hans Arp. The following year, her work was shown in the Société des Artistes Indépendants' 50th annual Salon des Indépendants.

== World War II and emigration ==
In the summer of 1939, Sterne and her husband returned to Bucharest from France for the last time. With the outbreak of World War II in September, the couple began to prepare to leave Europe for the United States. However, Sterne did not accompany her husband in the spring of 1940 when Fritz Stern left for New York. Instead, she remained in Bucharest with her family, where in January 1941 she was witness to the Bucharest pogrom and increasing political unrest. After trying for several months to acquire all the necessary visas to leave Romania for the U.S., Sterne finally departed Lisbon for New York aboard the S.S.Excambion on October 17, 1941.

== Arrival in New York ==
Hedda Sterne arrived in New York in late October 1941, where she was reunited with her estranged husband. The couple soon after changed their last name from Stern to Stafford. However, by late 1942 she was exhibiting her work under the name "Hedda Sterne". By adding an "e" to the end of her former married name, she maintained a connection to the name she had exhibited under in Europe.

In late 1941, Sterne established a studio and apartment on East 50th Street, nearby Peggy Guggenheim's home on Beekman Place. The two became close friends, and through Guggenheim, Sterne met and became reacquainted with many of the Surrealist artists she had known in Paris, including André Breton, Marcel Duchamp, and Max Ernst. Around this time Sterne also met and became close friends with the author Antoine de Saint-Exupéry. She would later play a critical role in advising Saint-Exupéry to use his own drawings to illustrate his book The Little Prince.

In 1942, Sterne was included in the seminal exhibition The First Papers of Surrealism, which opened on October 14 at the Whitelaw Reid Mansion in midtown Manhattan. By 1943, Sterne was regularly shown at Peggy Guggenheim's Art of This Century gallery in New York, including the 1943 Exhibition by 31 Women.

In February 1943, Sterne met fellow artist and Romanian refugee Saul Steinberg, whom she would marry on October 11, 1944, after her divorce from Stafford was finalized. By the end of 1943, Sterne had also begun her nearly 40-year collaboration with gallerist Betty Parsons, who gave Sterne her first solo exhibition in the U.S. at Wakefield Gallery in November. When the Betty Parsons Gallery opened in 1947, Sterne was among the first group of artists represented.

== The New York School and the "Irascibles" ==
Hedda Sterne was included in many major exhibitions of the New York School in the 1940s and 1950s, including Stable Gallery's Third Annual Exhibition of Painting and Sculpture. During the 1950s, Sterne's notable contribution to Abstract Expressionism came in the form of her use of commercial spray paint to depict motion and light in her abstract renderings of roads, highways, and cityscapes. In 1950, Sterne was a key participant in the "Artists' Sessions at Studio 35," a discussion about the modern art scene in New York and the aims of the artists. In addition to Sterne, speakers included Robert Motherwell, Mark Rothko, Barnett Newman, Ad Reinhardt, Willem de Kooning, Hans Hofmann, Adolph Gottlieb, David Hare, Louise Bourgeois, and David Smith, among others. Following the two-day session, on May 20, 1950, Sterne was among 18 painters and ten sculptors who signed an open letter to the president of The Metropolitan Museum of Art to protest aesthetically conservative group-exhibition juries.

The subsequent media coverage of the open letter to the president of The Metropolitan Museum of Art, and a now iconic group photograph, gave notoriety to a group of artists including Sterne. After the publication of the letter in the New York Times on May 22, 1950, an editorial in The Herald Tribune of May 23, 1950, dubbed the group the "Irascible 18" and attacked the artists for "distortion of fact" in claiming the Metropolitan had "contempt" for modern painting. Life magazine's coverage of the protest in their January 15, 1951, edition included a photograph by Nina Leen. 15 of the letter's 28 signees arrived for the photo shoot: Theodoros Stamos, Jimmy Ernst, Barnett Newman, James Brooks, Mark Rothko, Richard Pousette-Dart, William Baziotes, Jackson Pollock, Clyfford Still, Robert Motherwell, Bradley Walker Tomlin, Willem de Kooning, Adolph Gottlieb, Ad Reinhardt, and Hedda Sterne.

Although the sculptors Louise Bourgeois and Mary Callery were among the signers of the letter, Hedda Sterne was the only woman in the photograph. This singularity made her name known to many who were unfamiliar with her work; as she remarked near the end of her life, "I am known more for that darn photo than for 80 years of work." "If I had an ego, it would bother me." Plus, she said, "it is a lie.”"Why? "I was not an Abstract Expressionist. Nor was I an Irascible."

== Mature career ==
In 1963, Sterne was granted a Fulbright Fellowship in painting, and spent more than a year working in Venice. Returning to New York in 1964, Sterne eschewed pressure to create a consistent and "marketable" style of artwork. She would express aversion to the idea of creating a "career" as an artist, preferring instead to follow her own path of expression and discovery. Her work of the 1960s and forward is often regarded as a progression of "series," following Sterne's ongoing and developing interests in visual perception, semiotics, existentialism, and meditation.

Though Sterne began to disengage socially from the art world and lead an increasingly private life in the 1960s, she continued to be involved in many exhibitions with Betty Parsons Gallery, CDS Gallery, and others. In 1977, her first retrospective exhibition was held at the Montclair Art Museum. In 1985, her second retrospective, "Hedda Sterne: Forty Years" was held at the Queens Museum. In November 1992, she met the art dealer Philippe Briet, and began a sustainable friendship which led to several projects until his death in February 1997. In October 1994, Briet introduced writer Michel Butor to Hedda Sterne, which began their collaboration on a book published in September 1995, La Révolution dans l'Arboretum. In 2006, her third retrospective exhibition, "Uninterrupted Flux: Hedda Sterne; A Retrospective" was held at the Krannert Art Museum.

Sterne was a prolific artist who maintained a daily practice of art-making throughout much of her career. She continued to create new work in her 80s and 90s, even while affected by macular degeneration. By 1998, she could no longer paint, but continued to draw. Between 2004 and 2008, Sterne suffered two strokes, which progressively affected her vision and movement. Hedda Sterne died on April 8, 2011, at the age of 100.

== Relationship with Saul Steinberg ==
Hedda Sterne and Saul Steinberg met in February 1943. Both were Romanian Jews and recent emigrants from Bucharest, though they had not known each other in Europe. Soon after their meeting, Steinberg left New York as an ensign in the US Naval Reserve. He spent the remainder of 1943 and much of 1944 stationed in China, India, North Africa and Italy, providing pictorial propaganda, primarily for the OSS's division of Morale Operations.

Sterne and Steinberg maintained correspondence while Steinberg was stationed abroad, much of which has been archived in the Hedda Sterne Papers at the Smithsonian's Archives of American Art and in the Saul Steinberg Papers at Yale University's Beinecke Rare Book and Manuscript Library. In 1944, Sterne agreed to marry Steinberg on his return and traveled to Reno, Nevada, to secure a divorce from her first husband. Sterne and Steinberg were married in New York on October 11, 1944.

Life Magazine featured a profile of the couple in their August 27, 1951, issue, titled "Steinberg and Sterne: Romanian-Born Cartoonist and Artist-Wife Ambush the World with Pen and Paintbrush".

Sterne and Steinberg lived together in New York until 1960, when they separated. Although they maintained a close friendship and remained married until Steinberg's death in 1999, she once remarked that their marriage license was "the first of Saul's phony documents, maybe."

== Death ==
Sterne died in 2011 and was buried in Green-Wood Cemetery in Brooklyn, New York.

== Awards ==
Sterne was awarded second prize at the Art Institute of Chicago Annual in 1957. In 1963, she was granted a Fulbright Fellowship, and studied in Venice. In 1967, her work won first prize at the Art Institute of Newport Annual. The American Academy of Arts & Letters awarded her a "Childe Hassam Purchase Award" in 1971, and a "Hassam and Speicher Purchase Fund Award" in 1984. In 1999, the French Minister of Culture awarded Sterne Chevalier of the Ordre des Arts et des Lettres.

== Artistic style ==
Sterne never liked to define her art or herself into any group socially or artistically. In Eleanor Munro's book Originals: American Women Artists, Sterne remarked:

I believe ... that isms and other classifications are misleading and diminishing. What entrances me in art is what cannot be entrapped in words.

Grace Glueck wrote:

Hedda Sterne views her widely varied works more as "in flux" than as definitive statements. She has maintained a stubborn independence from styles and trends, including Surrealism and Abstract Expressionism ... Although she never developed a signature style, Ms. Sterne's explorations have produced a small universe of evocative images.

== Legacy ==
Sterne has been often overlooked in art historical narratives of the post-war American art scene. At the time of her death, possibly the last surviving artist of the first generation of the New York School, Hedda Sterne viewed her widely varied works more as in flux than as definitive statements.

In 2006, the art historian Josef Helfenstein wrote:

From the very beginning of her career, Sterne maintained an individual profile in the face of Jackson Pollock, Willem de Kooning, Mark Rothko, and Barnett Newman, all of whom she knew personally. Her independence reflected artistic and personal integrity. The variety of Sterne's work, spanning from her initial appropriation of surrealist techniques to her investigation of conceptual painting, as well as her unprecedented installations in the 1960s, exemplify her adventurous spirit. Yet, the heterogeneity of her styles and her complete disinterest in the commercially driven art world have contributed to her exclusion from the canon. When the heroic male narratives of modernism begin to fade, we may, eventually, be ready to recognize her idiosyncratic body of work. Sterne's art is, indeed, a manifesto in favor of the untamable forces of the mind and the continually changing flux of life."

In 2016 her biography was included in the exhibition catalogue Women of Abstract Expressionism organized by the Denver Art Museum.

In 2016, Sterne's work was exhibited at Van Doren Waxter under the title "Machines 1947-1951". The New York Times wrote:

"Her first show at the gallery, it features paintings and monotype prints that were made at the same moment: the decade after Ms. Sterne arrived in New York from Bucharest, Romania, having barely escaped the Nazis. These muted, mostly tan and blue canvases depict machines inspired by farm equipment in Vermont, and reveal her sometime alliance with the Surrealists (especially a fellow Romanian artist, Victor Brauner). Anthropomorphic and uncanny, the paintings in "Machines" also recall the work of Francis Picabia, Eduardo Paolozzi and Lee Lozano ... It is wonderful to see Ms. Sterne finally coming out from behind the famous photograph and being seriously considered as a painter."

Stern's work was included in the 2021 exhibition Women in Abstraction at the Centre Pompidou.

== Collections ==
- Albrecht-Kemper Museum of Art, St. Joseph, Missouri
- Amon Carter Museum of American Art
- Art Institute of Chicago
- Buffalo AKG Art Museum
- Metropolitan Museum
- Museum of Modern Art
- National Gallery of Art
- Pennsylvania Academy of Fine Arts
- Smithsonian American Art Museum
- Toledo Museum of Art
- Virginia Museum of Fine Arts, Richmond
- Whitney Museum

== See also ==
- List of centenarians (artists)
