= Barbara Poe Levee =

American artist and collector (1922–2013)

- Barbara Poe Levee at 88 years old
- Born: Barbara Reis; March 4, 1922; New York, US
- Died: September 13, 2013 (aged 91)
- Known for: Painting; museum benefactor; Surrealism
- Movement: Surrealism
- Spouse(s): (1) James Poe (1943–63); (2) Michael Levee Jr. (1921-1988)

Barbara Poe Levee (1922–2013), born Barbara Reis, was an American surrealist painter, art collector and benefactor.

== Early life ==
Poe Levee was born in New York City on March 4, 1922. Her parents were among the art connoisseurs and art collectors who, in the early 1940s, supported European artists fleeing the Second World War. Her mother, Rebecca, was a painter, and her father, Bernard, a wealthy accountant. Both were avid collectors of modern art, an enthusiasm their daughter came to share.

Poe Levee was educated at the Rudolph Steiner School in New York, the Tyler School of Fine Arts in Philadelphia, and the International School of Geneva, Switzerland. Her education was supplemented with travels with her family throughout Europe during the 1930s.

She became friends with the painter Pegeen Vail and the daughter of Peggy Guggenheim. Other friends in the 1940s included artists such as Luchita Hurtado, Roberto Matta, Wolfgang Paalen, and Robert Motherwell. She studied painting and engraving with Kurt Seligmann.

In 1941, Poe Levee went with Robert Motherwell, a fellow student, Matta and the artist Anne Clark to the mountain town of Taxco, in Mexico. They also visited the British surrealist Gordon Onslow Ford, who lived at Lake Pátzcuaro in the state of Michoacán.

== Career ==
Her work appeared at several notable exhibitions, such as The First Papers of Surrealism exhibition in 1942 in New York, organized and selected by Marcel Duchamp and André Breton. In January 1943, Poe Levee exhibited in the Exhibition by 31 Women, organized by Peggy Guggenheim in her Art of This Century gallery in New York, showing a painting called The Enchanted Bull, which had strong surrealist influences. She was the youngest of the artists represented there. Her work also appeared in Peggy Guggenheim's follow-up exhibition, The Women, in 1945. In 1943 she returned to Mexico, visiting Mexico City with Vail, where she met the surrealist painter, Leonora Carrington.

In 1943, she married screenwriter, James Poe, while he was a naval officer in Key West, Florida. After World War II, they moved from Key West to Los Angeles and had a daughter and a son. They divorced in 1963 and she later married a Hollywood talent agent, Michael Levee Jr., son of M. C. Levee. Throughout her marriages she continued to paint and exhibit her work and also began to support and promote modern art. In 1946, she joined a group including the Hollywood stars, Fanny Brice, Edward G. Robinson, and Vincent Price, as well as the artists Marcel Duchamp and William Brice, and collectors such as Walter Conrad Arensberg and his wife, Louise, who together organized an exhibition of contemporary art in Exposition Park, Los Angeles. This led to the creation of the Art Institute in Beverly Hills in 1947, which showed the Arensburg collection for two years, before closing. Poe Levee was also a founding member of the UCLA Arts Council.

Between 1960 and 1972, her work was exhibited at the Rex Evans Gallery in Hollywood, as well as in New York, where she continued to exhibit until the late 1970s. In 1997, her work was exhibited in the Peggy Guggenheim Collection's Art of This Century: The Women exhibition, at the Pollock-Krasner House and Study Center in East Hampton, New York. Her last public exhibition was with Les Biller in Santa Monica in 2008.

Poe Levee was a significant art collector and made donations of works from her collection to several American museums, including the Norton Simon Museum in Pasadena, California, giving the Death Mask of Amedeo Modigliani by Jacques Lipchitz. She donated a Surrealist Immortal Life by John D. Graham to the Los Angeles County Museum of Art. The Hammer Museum at UCLA also received gifts.

== Death ==
Poe Levee continued painting into the late 1980s, working on smaller watercolors that could be handled from a chair. She died on September 13, 2013 in Santa Monica, California.

Her paintings are now held by, among others, the Solomon R. Guggenheim Foundation, the Lasker collection, the Getty Villa, and the Berkeley Art Museum and Pacific Film Archive.
