= Exhibition by 31 Women =

Temporary exhibition of women's art in New York, 1943

- Date: 5 January - 6 February 1943
- Location: Art of This Century gallery, New York City; 40°45′48.8″N 73°58′32.8″W
- Theme: Exhibition of art by women
- Organised by: Peggy Guggenheim; Marcel Duchamp; Max Ernst;

The Exhibition by 31 Women, held between 5 and 31 January 1943, was the first documented exhibition in the United States devoted exclusively to women artists. It was one of the first exhibitions organised by Peggy Guggenheim at her Art of This Century gallery in New York City, which was already becoming known as a center of activities for struggling young artists. Exhibitions confusingly showed both the works of these artists and pieces from the collection of Guggenheim, built up in Europe in the days before World War Two.

== Background ==
The Exhibition by 31 Women was conceived by Guggenheim in collaboration with Marcel Duchamp, who is usually credited with suggesting the idea. The participating artists were selected by a jury that included André Breton, Max Ernst (at that time the husband of Guggenheim), Duchamp, and Guggenheim. In the accompanying note, she wrote that Exhibition by 31 Women was meant to demonstrate that women's creative capacity went far beyond a decorative vein, as it had often been interpreted in the history of women's art over time.

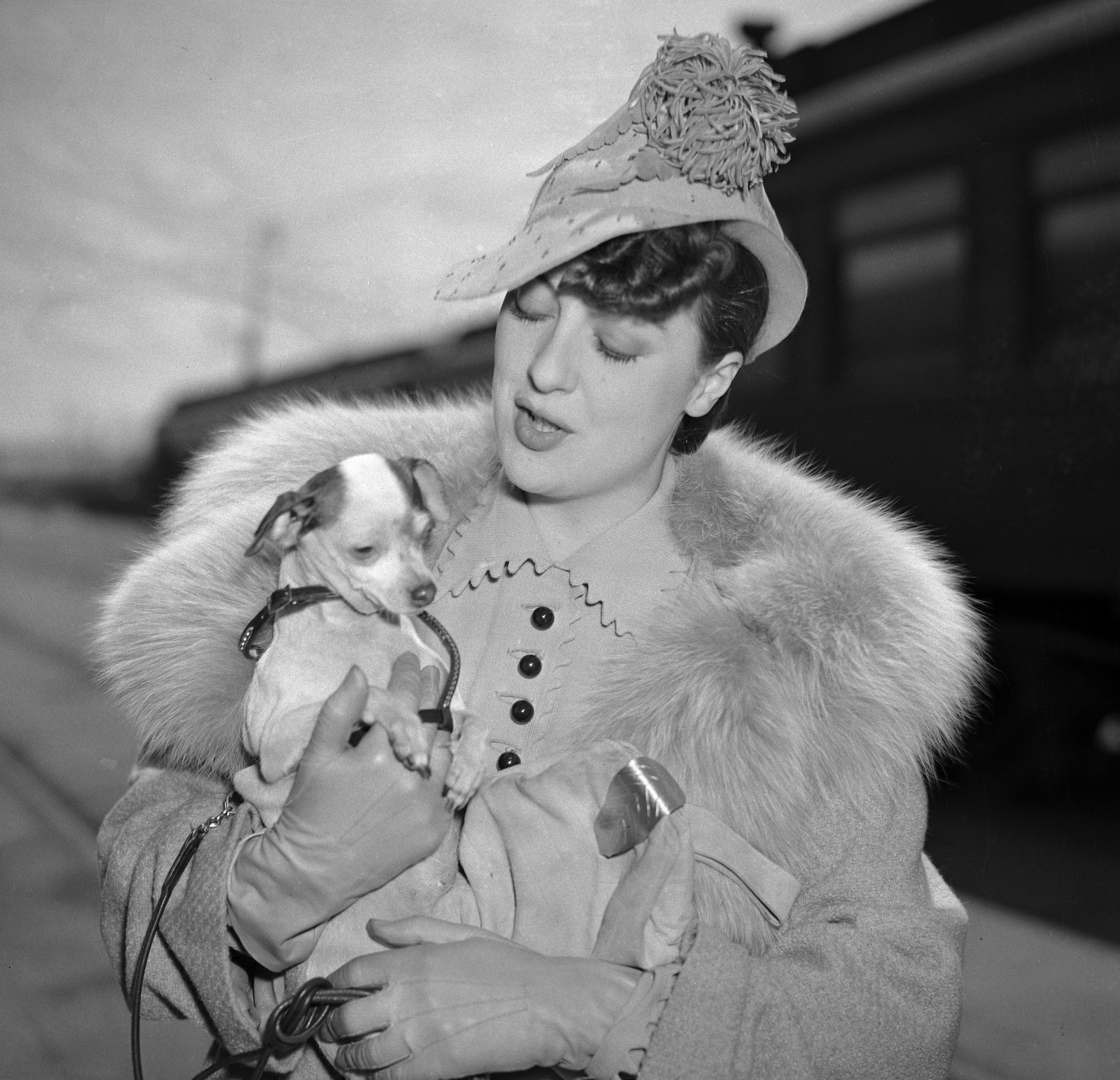
Gypsy Rose Lee, 1937

== Selection of artists ==
The exhibition relied heavily on artists already known to Guggenheim and the other jury members. Some of those were primarily known for the work of their male partners. Advice was sought from Alfred H. Barr Jr., first director of the Museum of Modern Art in New York, who provided Guggenheim with five names, of which three were included in the exhibition, Suzy Frelinghuysen, I. Rice Pereira, and Esphyr Slobodkina. Those already known to Guggenheim through their partners included Xenia Cage, wife of the composer John Cage, Frida Kahlo, wife of Diego Rivera, who was noted for his frescoes, Sophie Taeuber-Arp, wife of the sculptor, Jean Arp, and Jacqueline Lamba, ex-wife of the surrealist André Breton. By including so many artists who were partners of male artists, it seems that Guggenheim was taking an easy option to promote an all-women exhibition, thereby avoiding a rigorous search for new artists.

Guggenheim’s sister, Hazel Guggenheim McKinley and her daughter, Pegeen Vail Guggenheim exhibited. Also in the exhibition was the burlesque dancer, Gypsy Rose Lee, another friend of Guggenheim, who was possibly included more to help publicise the event than for her artistic skills. Other artists were friends of Guggenheim or of Max Ernst. One, Dorothea Tanning, was Ernst's lover, leading Guggenheim to say: "I realized that I should have only had thirty women in the show". Only one artist is known to have refused the invitation to submit works, Georgia O'Keeffe, who reportedly responded that she wished to be identified as a painter, and not singled out because of her gender.

One notable feature of the selection process was that it involved a jury. While juries had been commonly used to select works for display in Europe, this was uncommon in New York. The jury consisted of Guggenheim (the only woman), Breton, Duchamp, Ernst and his son Jimmy Ernst, James Thrall Soby, and James Johnson Sweeney. There were clear conflicts of interest within the jury, given the submission of works by present or former lovers.

The exhibition generated a notable media impact, both due to the surrealist pieces displayed and its innovative installation with curved walls, designed by the architect Frederick Kiesler. It highlighted the fact that surrealism had used women more as art objects, as muses, models or mistresses, than as creators. Furthermore, it contributed to the first steps of abstraction, which would be consolidated in the United States in subsequent decades. Guggenheim’s goal was, ultimately, to vindicate the importance of these artists as independent creators, and not simply as muses or models.

The exhibition was a commercial failure. Only three works were sold, and the only buyer was Guggenheim herself. Some media outlets refused to cover the exhibition. However, despite the controversy, Guggenheim's gallery began to gain prominence in the New York art scene as a result of her subsequent exhibitions. Of the artists who participated in the exhibition, only a few achieved great success, while others had to hide their female identity in order to sell. One example was Irene Rice Pereira, who signed herself as I. Rice Pereira.

== Participants ==
The women who exhibited were:

- Djuna Barnes
- Xenia Cage
- Leonora Carrington
- Maria Elena Vieira da Silva
- Eyre de Lanux
- Leonor Fini
- Elsa von Freytag-Loringhoven
- Suzy Frelinghuysen
- Meraud Guinness
- Anne Harvey
- Valentine Hugo
- Buffie Johnson
- Frida Kahlo
- Jacqueline Lamba
- Gypsy Rose Lee
- Aline Meyer Liebman
- Hazel McKinley
- Milena Pavlović-Barili
- Louise Nevelson
- Meret Oppenheim
- Barbara Poe Levee
- I. Rice Pereira
- Kay Sage
- Sonja Sekula
- Gretchen Schoeninger Corazzo
- Esphyr Slobodkina
- Hedda Sterne
- Dorothea Tanning
- Sophie Taeuber-Arp
- Julia Thecla
- Pegeen Vail Guggenheim

== Legacy ==
Overall, the exhibition played a crucial role in advancing the visibility and acceptance of women artists, leading to greater diversity in the art world. Some of the participating artists went on to have significant careers. Examples include Kahlo, Frelinghuysen, Barnes and Sterne. Others were not so fortunate. Taeuber-Arp died a week after the exhibition opened, although her legacy as an important Swiss artist remains. Cage remains largely unknown for her artwork. Three of the 31 committed suicide: Sekula, still regarded as one of the most important Swiss artists of the 20th Century, Vail, Guggenheim’s daughter, and Sage.

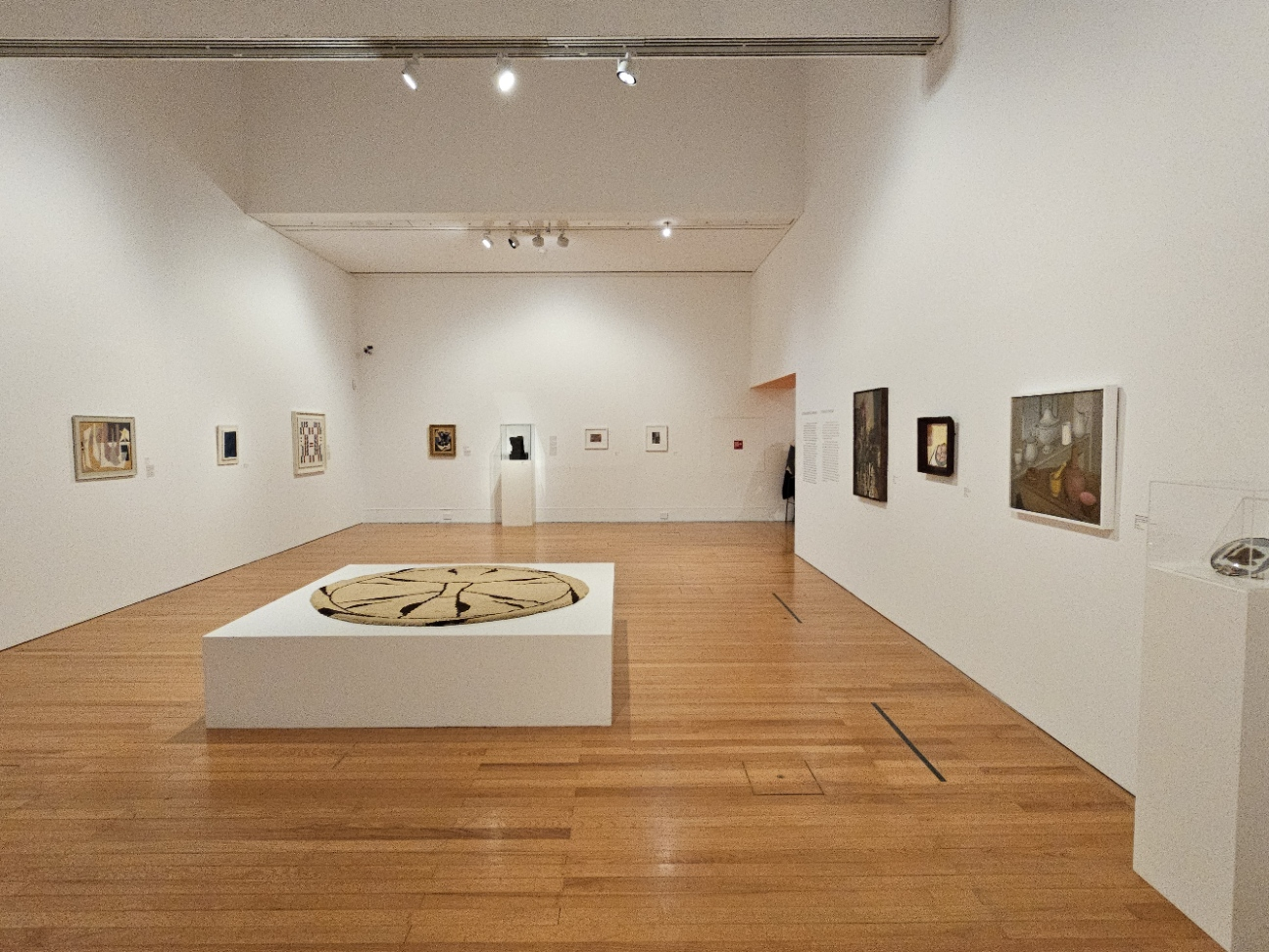
The Lisbon exhibition, March 2025

To commemorate the 80th anniversary of the show, one work from each of the original 31 artists was exhibited in the same space as the original exhibition, based on the collections of American collector and entrepreneur Jenna Segal. In 2024, the Mapfre Foundation took the exhibition to Madrid, entitled 31 Women. An exhibition by Peggy Guggenheim. It was then transferred to Lisbon in 2025.

== See also ==
- All I Want (art exhibition), exhibition of women's art held in Portugal in 2021.
- Twenty Six Contemporary Women Artists, art exhibition held in London in 1971.
- Women Artists: 1550-1950, exhibition held in Los Angeles in 1976.
- Les femmes artistes d'Europe, exhibition of artists from twenty countries held in Paris in 1937.
- Australian Exhibition of Women's Work, exhibition held in Melbourne in 1907.
