= Alaska State Library =

State of Alaska research library, collections and services

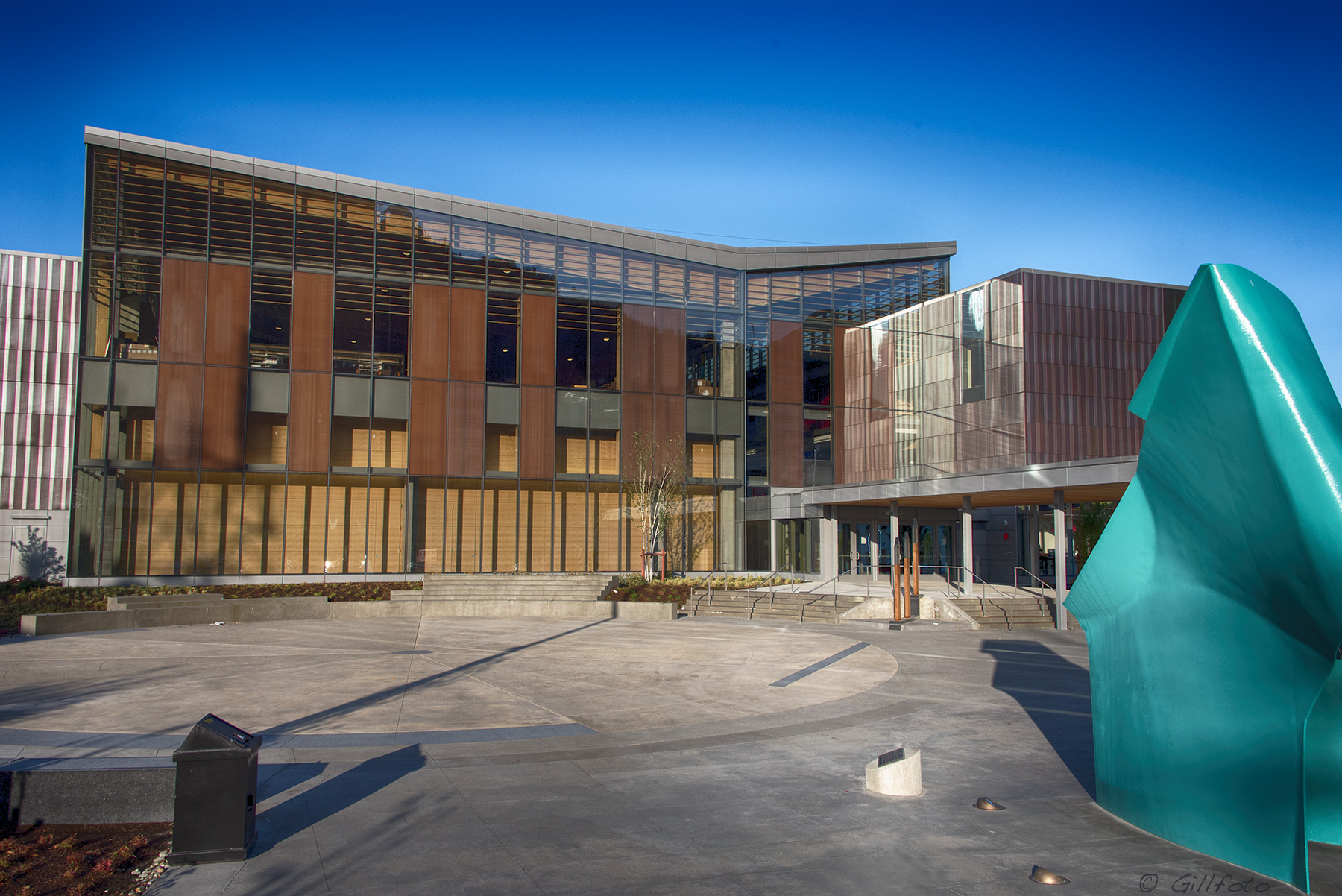
- The Andrew P. Kashevaroff building
- 58°18′00″N 134°24′57″W
- Location: Juneau, Alaska
- Established: June 6, 1900

Other information
- Website: library.alaska.gov

The Alaska State Library and Historical Collections and Talking Book Center are located on the second floor of the Andrew P. Kashevaroff Building in Juneau, Alaska.

== Mission statement ==
The Alaska State Library:

- promotes and coordinates library services to the community of Alaskan libraries,
- serves as the primary research library for state government, and
- collects, preserves, and makes accessible Alaska-related materials.

== About the Library ==
The State Library coordinates library services throughout the state and serves as the information resource for the state government and the Legislature. It includes the Historical Section, which collects Alaskana and preserves private papers and materials of historical value to the state. The State Library also collects, catalogs and makes available state agency publications. This is done through the Alaska State Publications program, which distributes the publications to depository libraries throughout the state.

The State Library administers federal and state grants for public library construction and services. It coordinates the Alaska Library Network (ALN), which provides interlibrary loans, cooperative collection development, and resource sharing among libraries. The Governor's Advisory Council on Libraries advises on the federal long-range spending plan.

Since 1950, the library has offered a mail service that will transport books to patrons in remote areas of the state. This service is currently offered through the Alaska Library Extension program at the Juneau Public Libraries.

== Talking Book Center ==
The Alaska Talking Book Center provides audio books, large print, and Braille materials to people who are blind or have visual, physical, or reading impairments that make it difficult for them to read traditional books. Materials are downloadable or can be shipped. The program serves the entire state, includes necessary equipment, and is completely free, including shipping both directions.

== See also ==
- List of libraries in the United States
