= Jeu de Marseille =

Surrealist playing card deck

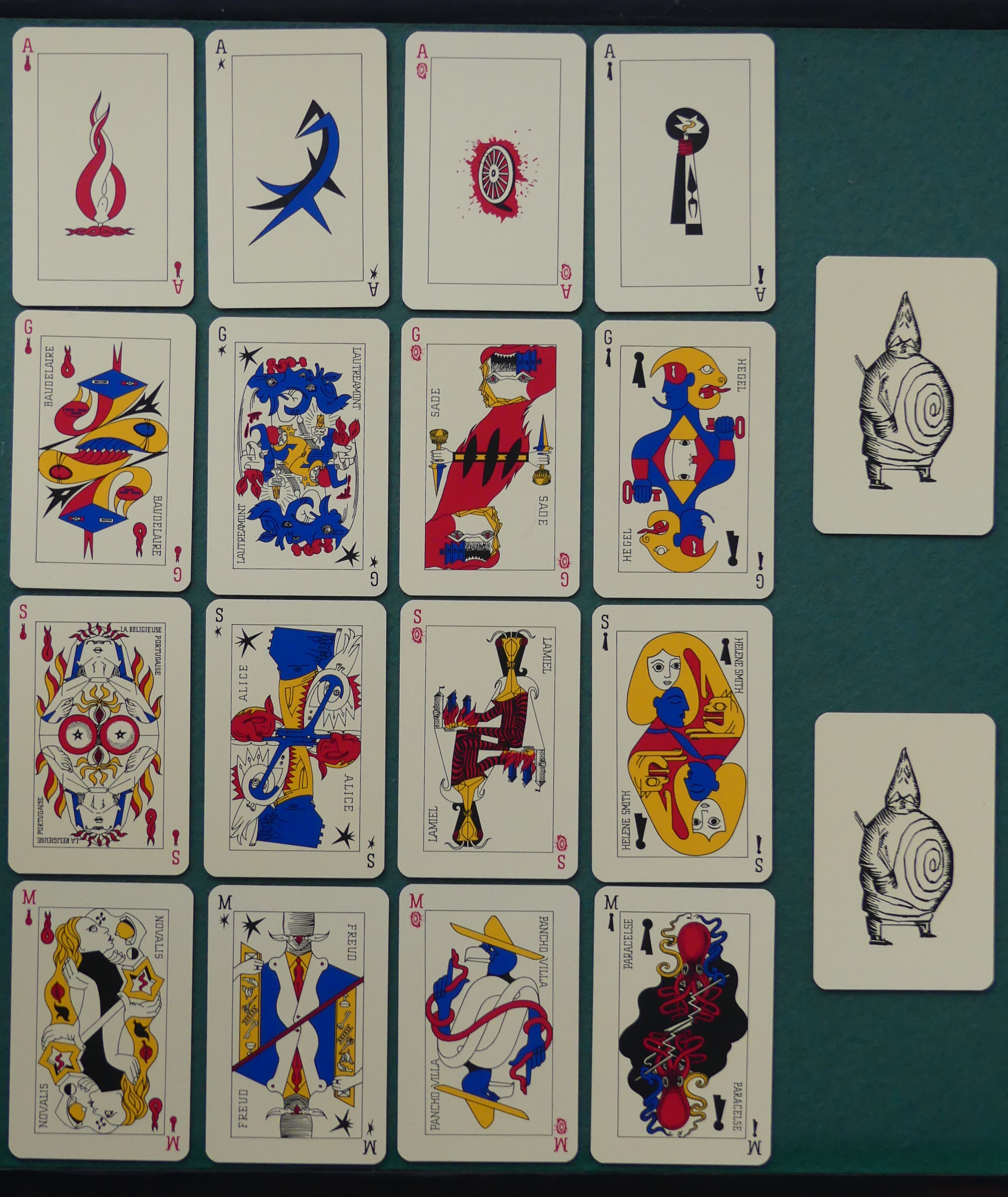
Aces, Geniuses, Sirens and Jokers of the jeu de Marseille.

The Jeu de Marseille (English: "Marseille Deck") is a variant of French-suited playing cards created in March 1941 by Surrealist artists who had taken refuge at the Air-Bel villa in Marseille.

== Historical circumstances ==
On 14 August 1940, the American journalist Varian Fry (1907–1967), an antinazi who had saved between 2000 and 4000 Jews, arrived in Marseille as a representative of the Emergency Rescue Committee, seeking to enable artistic, political, or scientific personages threatened by Article 19 of the Armistice (which mandated the extradition to the Germans of all foreigners declared undesirable) to leave the country. He was financially backed by a rich heiress, Mary Jayne Gold and also received the patronage of Eleanor Roosevelt.

To house the refugees while they awaited a visa allowing them to leave the country, Fry rented an 18-room mansion called the Air-Bel Villa, in the La Pomme neighborhood of Marseille. At the beginning of October 1940 the first occupants arrived: the writer Victor Serge with his wife Laurette and their son Vlady, then André Breton, his wife Jacqueline Lamba and their daughter Aube.

Other Surrealists joined Breton there: the painters Victor Brauner, Max Ernst, Wifredo Lam, André Masson, Oscar Dominguez, Jacques Hérold, and the poet Benjamin Péret. Ils reconstituent un groupe et tentent de reprendre leurs activités malgré l'absence de moyens.

== Jeu de Marseille ==
During one of their frequent gatherings at Au Brûleur de loups, a café on the Vieux Port, someone suggested the idea of creating a card game.

It would consist of "substituting new images for the old ones without breaking the general structure of thirty-two or fifty-two cards, and its division into equal parts black and red." André Breton explains: "what we broadly reject here out of the old pack of cards, is everything that points to the survival of the sign and the thing signified."

The Surrealists sought to attack "the social values of the face cards, depriving the king and the queen of their long-vanished power, and relieving the jack of his subaltern rank."

The king, queen and jack thus become Génie ("Genius" or "Genie"), Sirène ("Siren") et Mage ("Mage"). These figures, with their strong symbolism, were chosen by common agreement. Génie had been a suit during the French Revolution.

As to the four suits, they became: the Flame of love, the Star of dreams, the Wheel of revolution et the Lock of knowledge.

After drawing for the face cards, twenty-two designs were drafted by Victor Brauner, André Masson, Oscar Dominguez, Max Ernst, Jacques Hérold, Wifredo Lam, Jacqueline Lamba et André Breton.

Finally, the joker was depicted as Père Ubu, from Alfred Jarry's play Ubu Roi.

The cards were published for the first time in 1943 in the Surrealist magazine VVV, then exhibited at the Museum of Modern Art in New York. In 1983, the cards were published by André Dimanche in Marseille. In 2003, Aube Elléouët-Breton and her daughter Oona presented the twenty-two designs for the pack to the Musée Cantini.

== The cards ==
- André Breton

- Paracelsus. Mage of Knowledge.

- Ace of Knowledge.

- Victor Brauner

- Hélène Smith. Siren of Knowledge.

- Hegel. Genius of Knowledge.

- Oscar Dominguez

- Freud. Mage of Dream.

- Ace of Dream.

- Max Ernst

- Pancho Villa. Mage of Revolution.

- Ace of Love.

- Jacques Hérold

- Lamiel. Siren of Revolution.

- Sade. Genius of Revolution.

- Wifredo Lam

- Lautréamont. Genius of Dream.

- Alice. Siren of Dream.

- Jacqueline Lamba

- Ace of Revolution.

- Baudelaire. Genius of Love.

- André Masson

- The Portuguese Nun. Siren of Love.

- Novalis. Mage of Love.

- Frédéric Delanglade produced the backs of the cards.
