= Sonja Sekula =

American artist (1918–1963)

Sonia Sekula
- Sonja Sekula at Andre Breton's Atelier NY 1945
- Born: April 8, 1918; Lucerne, Switzerland
- Died: April 25, 1963 (aged 45); Zürich, Switzerland
- Known for: Painting
- Movement: Abstract Expressionism

Sonja Sekula (8 April 1918 – 25 April 1963) (also known as Sonia Sekula) was an American artist linked with the abstract expressionist movement, notable for her activity as an "out" lesbian in the New York art world during the 1940s and early 1950s.

She met the surrealists in exile in New York during 1942. On 25 April 1963, she hanged herself in her studio in Zurich after many years of mental health issues. She is buried in St. Moritz as she had requested in a letter to her mother.

== Early life and education ==
Sonja Sekula was born in Lucerne on 8 April 1918 to a Swiss mother, Berta Huguenin (1896–1980), and a Hungarian father, Béla Sekula (1881–1966), a philatelist.

Sekula and her family relocated to New York from Lucerne, Switzerland when she was a child. She lived in New York, New Mexico, Mexico, and in different cities in Europe.

Sekula moved to New York in 1936, when her father moved his philatelic business there. In a letter sent to her mother, Sonja described New York as "very gray. All the steel constructions are waking up and their steel shines towards new work."

She attended school at Sarah Lawrence College but left after two years, entering the Art Students League where she studied under Dadaist George Grosz and Modernist Morris Kantor.

== Career ==
In New York Sekula befriended American poet Carl Sandburg and met the surrealists in exile during 1942. It was during this time that she became part of an international circle of artists, writers, choreographers, and composers in New York in the 1940s, when she was in her early twenties.

Peggy Guggenheim included Sekula in the 1943 exhibition Exhibition by 31 Women at her Art of This Century gallery, and gave Sekula her first solo exhibition in 1946. Betty Parsons Gallery exhibited Sekula's work in 1948. In 1949, she had a third one-man show and was also included in a Betty Parson's group show with Theodoros Stamos, Jackson Pollock, and Barnett Newman.

Despite people holding good opinions of her work, the same could not be said about the artist. Sonja was seen as unfortunate due to not only her mental state, but also her open sexuality. Thus her work is often overlooked.

Sekula returned to Switzerland with her family in 1955 and remained there for the rest of her life, although she did return to New York in 1957. In 1957 Sekula had a solo exhibition at Galerie Palette, Zurich.

Her work is in the collections of the Irish Museum of Modern Art, the Museum of Modern Art, the Pennsylvania Academy of the Fine Arts, and the Walker Art Center. In 2016 her biography was included in the exhibition catalogue Women of Abstract Expressionism organized by the Denver Art Museum.

== Personal life ==
Sonja was extremely passionate about her artwork, expressing how proud she was to be around all the other artists and movements in New York during the 1940s. Her instructor described her as being "easy to get along with" yet also being "highly disturbed" When compared to her other students, Kantor explained "no matter what she did it was of great interest compared with the other students. She was always one of the best in the class. Her work was much more creative and moving than most; it always had great spirit."

After joining the Student’s Art league she met André Breton and started joining meetings for the Surrealist Group in exile. She grew very close with him and his wife. Through the group she also became close friends with poet Charles Duit, sculptor David Hare, and Alice Rahon.

On a trip to Tangier in 1950 to meet Paul Bowles, Joseph Glasco was introduced to Sekula by Jane Bowles. Sekula and Glasco remained friends when they returned to New York. In April 1951, the day after the opening of her third exhibition at Betty Parsons Gallery, Sekula suffered a breakdown and had to be taken to the psychiatric clinic of the New York Hospital in White Plains by Manina Thoren and Joseph Glasco.

Sonja Sekula was also extremely open about her homosexuality, and made frequent references to it in her writings and journals. In one entry, she wrote the following:

1960: "Let homosexuality be forgiven, let us hope that she will be welcome in the Greek mythology and protected by pagan nature gods as well for most often she did not sin against nature but tried to be true to the law of her own - To feel guilt about having loved a being of your own kind body and soul is hopeless - let us hope there were many pure moments in each of these attractions and loves - into which the realm of sphere and eternity and silence entered as well."

Sonja Sekula had a history of mental illness, having been admitted to several mental health clinics throughout her life. This aspect of her life was also well-documented in her own writings and journals:

1957: "I do not feel part of any country or race. I was well when they called me sick and often sick when they thought I am well. Have in thoughts been surprised at the vanity of others and surprised also at my own." 1961: "I hope to die without too much pain. Life was an interesting experience. I do not regret it-"

== Exhibitions ==
- 1943 - Group show Exhibition by 31 Women, Art of This Century gallery, New York
- 1948 - Betty Parsons Gallery, New York
- 1950 - 'Sonja Sekula (First Exhibition in London)', London Gallery, London
- 1953 - Group Show "Nine Women Painters", Bennington College, Bennington, Vermont
- 1957 - Galerie Palette, Zurich, Switzerland
- 1996 - Kunstmuseum Winterthur, Switzerland
- 1996 - Sonja Sekula (1918–1963): A Retrospective, Swiss Institute, New York, USA (12 September - 26 October)
- 2016 - "Sonja Sekula, Max Ernst, Jackson Pollock & Friends", Kunstmuseum Luzern, Switzerland
- 2017 - Sonja Sekula: A Survey, Peter Blum Gallery, New York
- 2019 - "Sparkling Amazons: Abstract Expressionist Women of the 9th St." Katonah Museum of Art, Westchester County, NY.
- 2023 - Action, Gesture, Paint: Women Artists and Global Abstraction 1940-1970 Whitechapel Gallery, London

== Bibliography ==
- Womb - poem and drawing - VVV, March 1943
- Who was Sonia Sekula?, Art in America, October 1971
- A Golden Girl Escaping Into Infinity, New York Times, 20 September 1996
- Sonja Sekula - Im Zeichen der Frage, im Zeichen der Antwort. Ausgewählte Texte und Wortbilder, (in German and English) Lenos Verlag, Zürich 1996. ISBN 3-85787-250-0
- Dunkelschwestern - Annemarie von Matt und Sonja Sekula, by Roger Perret and Roman Kurzmeyer, 2008
- Sonja Sekula & Friends, by Kunstmuseum Luzern, 2016
- "Sekula, Sonja". SIKART Lexicon on art in Switzerland.
