= Charles Seliger =

American painter (1926–2009)

Charles Seliger (June 3, 1926 – October 1, 2009) was an American abstract expressionist painter. He was born in Manhattan June 3, 1926, and he died on 1 October 2009, in Westchester County, New York. Seliger was one of the original generation of abstract expressionist painters connected with the New York School.

== Career ==
He began his career in 1945 as one of the youngest artists to exhibit at The Art of This Century gallery, and as the youngest artist associated with the Abstract expressionist movement. The Art of This Century gallery was opened in New York City during World War II in 1942 by Peggy Guggenheim who was then married to the surrealist painter Max Ernst. In 1943, Seliger met and befriended Jimmy Ernst the son of Max Ernst, and who at the age of 23 years was just a few years older than Seliger. Seliger was drawn into the circle of the avant-garde through his friendship with Ernst. His paintings attracted the attention of Howard Putzel who worked with Peggy Guggenheim. At 19, Seliger was included in Putzel’s groundbreaking exhibition A Problem for Critics at the 67 Gallery, (which was located at 67 E.57th Street in Manhattan). Also in 1945 he had his first solo show at the Art of This Century Gallery. Seliger showed his paintings there until 1947 when Guggenheim closed the gallery and returned to Europe. At 20 the Museum of Modern Art acquired his painting Natural History: Form within Rock (1946), for their permanent collection.

Known for creating small jewel-like paintings (unlike most painters from the NY School who worked in large-scale formats). He was a veteran of more than 45 solo exhibitions at important contemporary galleries and museums. In 1950 he joined the Willard Gallery, in New York who represented important contemporary artists of the time including David Smith, Morris Graves and several others. He formed close friendships with many of the Willard Gallery artists, including Mark Tobey, Lyonel Feininger, and Norman Lewis. Seliger had his first museum exhibition, at the De Young Museum, San Francisco in 1949. In 1986, he was the subject of a retrospective exhibition, at the Solomon R. Guggenheim Museum. He was represented by Michael Rosenfeld Gallery in New York until 2014, and had an exhibition there in 2003 that was reviewed in Art in America.

== Museum collections ==
His work is also represented in many museum collections including:

- Addison Gallery, Andover, MA
- Arkansas Arts Center, Little Rock, AR
- Art Institute of Chicago, Chicago, IL
- Baltimore Museum of Art, Baltimore, MD
- British Museum, London, England
- Brooklyn Museum of Art, Brooklyn, NY
- Carnegie Museum of Art, Pittsburgh, PA
- Gemeentemuseum Den Haag, The Hague, Holland
- Greenville County Museum of Art, Greenville, SC
- Herbert F. Johnson Museum of Art, Cornell University, Ithaca, NY
- High Museum of Art, Atlanta, GA
- Hirshhorn Museum and Sculpture Garden, Washington, DC
- Israel Museum, Jerusalem, Israel
- Museum of Contemporary Art Jacksonville, Jacksonville, FL
- Jane Voorhees Zimmerli Art Museum, Rutgers University, New Brunswick, NJ
- Long Beach Museum of Art, Long Beach, CA
- Mead Art Museum, Amherst College, Amherst, MA
- Metropolitan Museum of Art, New York, NY
- Milwaukee Art Museum, Milwaukee, WI
- Mississippi Museum of Art, Jackson, MS
- Mobile Museum of Art, Mobile, AL
- Munson-Williams-Proctor Arts Institute, Utica, NY
- Museum of Fine Arts (Houston), Houston, TX
- Museum of Modern Art, New York, NY
- Neuberger Museum of Art, Purchase College, State College of New York, Purchase, NY
- Newark Museum, Newark, NJ
- New Orleans Museum of Art, New Orleans, LA
- New York Public Library, New York, NY
- Norton Museum of Art, West Palm Beach, FL
- Ogunquit Museum of American Art, Ogunquit, ME
- Oklahoma City Museum of Art, Oklahoma City, OK
- Peggy Guggenheim Collection, Venice, Italy
- The Phillips Collection, Washington, DC
- Rose Art Museum, Brandeis University, Waltham, MA
- Seattle Art Museum, Seattle, WA
- Smithsonian American Art Museum, Washington, DC,
- Solomon R. Guggenheim Museum, New York, NY
- Staatliche Kunsthalle Karlsruhe, Karlsruhe, Germany
- Sunrise (Charleston, West Virginia), Charleston, WV
- Terra Museum, Chicago, IL
- Wadsworth Atheneum, Hartford, CT
- Whitney Museum of American Art, New York, NY
- Worcester Art Museum, Worcester, MA

== Awards and honors ==
In 2003, (at age 77), he received the Pollock-Krasner Foundation’s Lee Krasner Award in recognition of his lifetime in the arts.

In 2005, the Morgan Library and Museum acquired his journals—148 hand-written volumes produced between 1952 and the present—making his introspective writing, which covers a vast range of topics across the span of six decades, accessible to art historians and scholars.

== Personal life ==
In 1948, Seliger married artist Ruth Lewin, and they remained married until her death in 1975.
