= Anne Harvey =

American artist (1916–1967)

- Born: November 1917; Chicago, Illinois, United States
- Died: 1967; Paris, France
- Education: Trained by Fernand Léger and Constantin Brâncuși
- Known for: Painting

Anne Harvey (1916–1967) was an American painter who spent most of her life in Paris. Highly regarded there for her unique, original, and varying styles, which were not dictated by any major influences, her reclusive character, lack of self-promotion, and the fact that she was a woman, in an art world dominated by men, have left her now being relatively unknown.

== Early life and education ==
Harvey was born into an artistic family in Chicago in November 1916. Her father, Harry Harvey, was an advertising executive and author. Her mother, Dorothy Dudley Harvey, was a writer and poet, best known for having written a biography of Theodore Dreiser. She attended a progressive school in Chicago, together with her brother, Jason. Introduced to painting by her aunt, Katharine Dudley, she showed a talent for drawing and painting from her early years.

== Move to Paris ==
In 1928, she moved to Paris with her mother and aunt, who felt that their inheritance could go further there. Her mother had published an article on Constantin Brâncuși in the modernist magazine, The Dial, in 1927. Through her and her aunt she gradually met many artists, including Brâncuși and Jules Pascin, who did a drawing of her, as well as Fernand Léger, Francis Picabia, Joan Miró, Henri Matisse, Pablo Picasso, Alexander Calder, Léopold Survage, Louis Marcoussis, and Walker Evans, who photographed her. She studied under Léger but, after seeing her work, Matisse suggested that she work with Brâncuși instead. There are photographs, taken by Brâncuși, of Harvey in his studio and in 1934 she did a large drawing and a large painting of the sculptor in that studio. Both the drawing and the painting were based on a self-portrait photograph Brancusi had given to Harvey. In the drawing, she included many of the items in the studio that appeared in the photograph, while the painting omitted these.

Other drawings that she prepared in her early days in Paris included Still Life with a Cat; Woman with Cat; Shopfront, Night, Paris; and Buildings, Paris. All show examples of her love of complex overall patterns. This unique drawing style translated well to her paintings. Rooftops shows an outdoor scene of shapes and figures, some resembling roofs and others buildings entwined in branches. The painting indicates a strong departure from Realism, which was much in vogue in the US at the time. Another painting, Two Trees and a River, combines elements of impressionism and expressionism. The colours she used for many of her paintings are said to have been "unusual and subtle".

Harvey and her mother travelled in Europe. In 1936 they found themselves hiding in a Barcelona hotel, surrounded by the fighting of the Spanish Civil War, but managed to escape and return to Paris. In 1940 they returned to New York ahead of the German invasion of France, though her aunts, Catherine and Caroline, remained in France throughout World War II. She was not happy in America, even though several of the people she had known in Paris had also made their way to New York, such as the sculptor Alexander Calder, the writer Georges Duthuit, and Miro, who had been her lover in Paris. She returned to Paris as soon as it was possible.

Despite her many contacts in Paris, her career did not take off. This was possibly because she followed no artistic movement and because she was too reclusive to be able to effectively promote her works. Her shyness meant she had remained dependent on her elder relatives for too long. Similarly, most of her artist friends were much older than she was. She moved into a smaller studio and continued to work, but became increasingly secluded, smoked heavily, and apparently ate little.

Despite her retiring nature, her talent was recognized by fellow artists and more discerning critics. Writing in ArtNews Annual in 1966, John Ashbery included Harvey in his essay examining the work of American artists working abroad. Of Harvey's work he wrote:

"[her] curious metaphysical still lifes and interiors are admired by Giacometti and Helion, among others... Despite appearances, her paintings are unrealistic: leaves and stems twist unnaturally away, shadows are wrongly placed; everything directs the eye into the inner reaches of the being of the objects painted. A curious anxiety, tempered by the exhilaration of her novel optics, is the result."

== Exhibitions ==
During her lifetime, her work was shown in only six exhibitions, both one-person and group shows. Two of the group shows were at Peggy Guggenheim's Art of This Century gallery in New York. These were the Exhibition by 31 Women in 1943 and The Women in 1945. In the Exhibition by 31 Women, she showed Still Life, a painting done in 1942. It is possible that Guggenheim knew of her work when they were both in Paris.

On the strength of these two exhibitions in New York she had her first solo exhibition, in Chicago in 1945, where she sold six paintings, despite not attending the show. Eleanor Jewett, reviewing it in the Chicago Daily Tribune, called it the introduction of “a new star to the art world.” She described Harvey’s draftsmanship as surpassing Matisse in certain drawings, and called the Portrait of Brancusi “revealing, gentle, and comprehensive.” The show included landscapes, still lifes, portraits, and drawings. André Masson wrote a preface to the exhibition.

Her final exhibition was in 1963 at the Galerie Janine Hao in Paris.

== Death ==
Harvey died in Paris in 1967. Marcel Duchamp wanted to organize a posthumous exhibition of her art, but died in 1968 before he could do so. In 1971 her brother Jason arranged a memorial exhibition in New York. More recently, her nephew, Steven Harvey has continued to promote her reputation, with a 2002 exhibition in New York that presented her work, that of Jason, and his own paintings of nudes, a solo exhibition in 2017 and, in 2022, an exhibition of her work in Paris together with work done in Paris by Raymond Mason.
