= Pegeen Vail Guggenheim =

Swiss-born American painter (1925–1967)

- Born: Pegeen Jezebel Margaret Vail; August 18, 1925; Ouchy, Switzerland
- Died: March 1, 1967 (aged 41); Paris, France
- Occupation: Painting
- Spouse(s): Jean Hélion; Ralph Rumney
- Children: 4
- Parent(s): Peggy Guggenheim; Laurence Vail
- Family: Guggenheim

Pegeen Vail Guggenheim (August 18, 1925 – March 1, 1967) was a Swiss-born American painter. Her work combines surrealism and naïve art.

She was the daughter of the art collector Peggy Guggenheim and the writer Laurence Vail, and the granddaughter of Benjamin Guggenheim, who died on the RMS Titanic in 1912.

== Life ==
Pegeen Vail Guggenheim was born as Pegeen Jezebel Margaret Vail in Ouchy, Switzerland, and spent her childhood in France and England. In 1941, she left Europe for the United States with her mother, Peggy Guggenheim, and Max Ernst, who later became her stepfather. In the U.S., she studied at Finch College.

In 1943, she met the French painter Jean Hélion, who, along with his friends Piet Mondrian and Fernand Léger, helped introduce abstract art in the U.S. Guggenheim married Hélion in New York in 1946. The couple moved to Paris the same year. They had three children together: Fabrice, David, and Nicolas Hélion. When they divorced in 1956, Pegeen left Paris with her youngest son, Nicolas, to live with her mother in Venice.

In 1957, Guggenheim met the English painter Ralph Rumney in London at the opening of a Francis Bacon exhibition at the Hanover Gallery. Rumney was an English New Realist and one of the founders, along with Guy Debord and Piero Simondo, of the Situationist International. Guggenheim married Rumney in 1958 and gave birth to her fourth son, Sandro Rumney, the same year. In 1959, the couple moved to Paris, where they lived first on the rue du Dragon and then on the Île Saint-Louis.

Pegeen Guggenheim died in Paris on March 1, 1967, after overdosing on medication. She struggled all her life with depression.

== Art ==
During her short career, Guggenheim exhibited her work in New York (including the Museum of Modern Art), Philadelphia, Paris, London, Venice, Padua, Murano, Palm Beach, Vicenza, Stockholm, Toronto and San Diego.

Guggenheim befriended, and was inspired by, some of the greatest intellectuals and artists of the 20th century, including Yves Tanguy, Max Ernst, André Breton, Marcel Duchamp, and Jackson Pollock. Her painting combines two different artistic styles: surrealism and naïve art. She was especially inspired in her work by the Surrealist painters who surrounded her during her childhood, including Tanguy, with whom she exchanged some paintings, and Ernst, who was her stepfather from 1941 to 1946. Her work reflects their influence in the recurrence of improbable elements or situations in her decors or scenes, combined with her own, unique naïve style.

In January 1943 and in June 1945, Guggenheim's work was featured in exhibitions dedicated to women: Exhibition by 31 Women, and then "The Women", at the Art of This Century gallery opened by Peggy Guggenheim in New York in October 1942. Her paintings were shown alongside works by Kay Sage, Leonora Carrington, Lee Krasner, Dorothea Tanning, and Frida Kahlo. In her painting, Guggenheim often represents couples and families that seem happy and affectionate. Given her tumultuous childhood with her mother, this theme likely represents her search for a stable family life. The characters in Guggenheim's paintings are often taken directly from her own world: we can identify her mother, her husbands, her children, and especially Guggenheim herself. While her work seems cheerful at first glance, a sense of isolation and suffering is often perceptible: a woman crying while giving birth, for example, or characters that are dehumanized.

Raymond Queneau wrote the following introduction to one of her exhibition catalogues: "The world Pegeen creates is somehow more authentic than the real world because it seems closer to heaven on earth. No culpability tarnishes its colors or weighs upon its figures. After his expulsion, Adam with his pure heart traced perfect representations of vengeful bison on hidden cave walls. What was Eve doing? Probably listening to cries that she was guilty. But here, as Prévert says: 'God has been expelled from heaven on earth' and it is 'the new season'. 'A fertile ground—a childlike moon—a hospitable sea—a smiling sun—at the edge of the water—girls embodying the spirit of the times.' Pegeen Hélion belongs to this race of 'ambrosial children.'"
