= Jimmy Ernst =

American painter (1920–1984)

- Born: Hans-Ulrich Ernst; June 24, 1920; Cologne, Germany
- Died: February 6, 1984 (aged 63); New York City, US
- Education: Max Ernst
- Known for: Painting
- Movement: Abstract Expressionism, Surrealism

Hans-Ulrich Ernst (June 24, 1920 – February 6, 1984), known as Jimmy Ernst, was an American painter born in Germany.

== Early life ==
Jimmy Ernst was born in 1920 in Cologne, Germany, the son of German Surrealist painter Max Ernst and Luise Straus-Ernst, a well-known art historian and journalist. His parents separated in 1922 and divorced in 1926 and Ernst remained with his mother in Cologne. He visited his father in France in 1930, where he met many artists, including Luis Buñuel, Salvador Dalí, Alberto Giacometti, André Masson, Joan Miró, Man Ray and Yves Tanguy, as well as his father's lover Leonora Carrington. In February 1933, a month after Hitler became Chancellor of Germany, the SS searched Luise Straus' apartment. As a noted intellectual and a Jew she was regarded as suspect by the new regime. Ernst was sent to live with his grandfather, Luise's father, while his mother moved to Paris. In June 1938, Jimmy sailed to New York from Le Havre on the liner SS Manhattan.

There he met many European exiles and the city's avant-garde. In 1940, he petitioned the Emergency Rescue Committee (ERC) to secure the release of his father from internment. The ERC secured his release in 1941 and Max Ernst arrived in New York from Nazi occupied France. In 1944, unknown to Jimmy, his mother was killed in Auschwitz concentration camp after being sent there from the Drancy internment camp in France.

== Career ==
In 1941 Jimmy Ernst became the assistant/secretary to Peggy Guggenheim (who was also his stepmother). Shortly afterwards Ernst became director of The Art of This Century Gallery in 1942. A year later he had his first one-person exhibition.

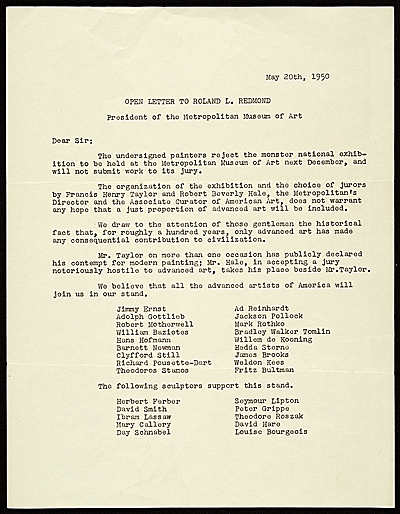
Open letter to Roland L. Redmond, May 20, 1950, unsigned copy from the Hedda Sterne papers, typed, 28 x 22 cm

During the late 1940s he became a member of The Irascible Eighteen, a group of abstract painters who protested against the Metropolitan Museum of Art's policy towards American painting of the 1940s, and who posed for a famous picture in 1950. Members of the group included: Willem de Kooning, Adolph Gottlieb, Ad Reinhardt, Hedda Sterne, Richard Pousette-Dart, William Baziotes, Jimmy Ernst, Jackson Pollock, James Brooks, Clyfford Still, Robert Motherwell, Bradley Walker Tomlin, Theodoros Stamos, Barnett Newman, and Mark Rothko. These artists are part of the New York School they were referred to as The Irascibles in an article featured in an issue of Life where the infamous Nina Leen photograph was published.

In 1951 Jimmy was granted the post of an instructor at Department of Design, Brooklyn College.

In 1969 he moved to East Hampton. He also built a winter home in Florida in 1980.

Awarded Guggenheim Fellowship in 1961, a Carnegie Foundation grant in 1967, and an honorary degree by the Long Island University (Southampton College) in 1982. Also elected to the American Academy of Arts and Letters. In 1977, he was elected into the National Academy of Design as an Associate Academician.

== Personal life ==
Ernst married Edith Dallas Bauman Brody (known as Dallas), a talent scout for Warner Brothers, on January 3, 1947. They had two children, Amy Louise (1953) and Eric Max (1956), both of whom are artists.

His memoir, A Not-So-Still Life, dealing with his youth and early years in the United States, was published shortly before his death in 1984.

Dallas Ernst established the Jimmy Ernst Award in memory of her husband. The award of $10,000 is given to a painter or sculptor "whose lifetime contribution to his or her vision has been both consistent and dedicated". The American Academy of Arts and Letters has presented the award annually since 1990.
