= David Hare (artist) =

American scultor (1917–1992)

- Born: March 10, 1917; New York City, New York, U.S.
- Died: December 21, 1992 (aged 75); Jackson, Wyoming, U.S.
- Known for: Photography; Sculpture; Painting.
- Movement: Surrealism; Abstract Expressionism; American Figurative Expressionism

David Hare (March 10, 1917 – December 21, 1992) was an American artist, associated with the Surrealist movement. He is primarily known for his sculpture, though he also worked extensively in photography and painting. The VVV Surrealism Magazine was first published and edited by Hare in 1942.

== Early life and education ==
Born March 10, 1917, in New York City, New York to father Meredith Hare, a lawyer and mother Elizabeth Sage Goodwin, an art collector. In the 1920s the family moved first to Santa Fe, New Mexico, and later to Colorado Springs, Colorado, in hope that the fresh air would help heal Meredith Hare's tuberculosis. His mother founded the Fountain Valley School, where David attended high school. After high school Hare married and moved to Roxbury, Connecticut, where he worked as a color photographer.

He attended Bard College in Annandale-on-Hudson from 1936 to 1937, studying biology and chemistry.

In the late 1930s, with no previous artistic training, he began to experiment with color photography. Using his previous education in chemistry Hare developed an automatist technique called "heatage" in which he heated the unfixed negative from an 8 by 10-inch plate, causing the image to ripple and distort.

== Career ==
Mountain Night (1969), The Phillips Collection, Washington, D.C.

Hare's Surrealist experiments in photography were only one of his many projects. In 1938 he met Susanna Winslow Wilson and the couple soon married. Both David and Susanna pursued their interests in Surrealism and regularly attended Surrealist gatherings in New York Larre French restaurant on 56th street and at Breton's Greenwich Village apartment. In 1940 he received a commission from the American Museum of Natural History to document the Pueblo Indians of the American Southwest, for which he eventually produced 20 prints developed using Eastman Kodak's then-new dye transfer process (a time-consuming and complicated technique). In the same year, he also opened his own commercial photography studio in New York City and exhibited his photographs in a solo show at the Julien Levy Gallery.

In the next few years, through his cousin the painter Kay Sage, he came into contact with a number of Surrealist artists who had fled their native Europe because of World War II. Hare became closely involved with the émigré Surrealist movement and collaborated closely with them on projects such as the Surrealist journal VVV, which he cofounded and edited from 1941 to 1944 with André Breton, Max Ernst, and Marcel Duchamp. David and Susanna divorced in 1945 and Breton’s wife Jacqueline Lamba left Andre for Hare. Breton wrote a book of poems titled How To Protect Young Cherry Trees From Hares that was illustrated by Arshile Gorky, in lamentation.

Hare began to experiment with Surrealist sculpture, which soon became his primary focus, and exhibited his work as solo shows in a number of prestigious venues, including Peggy Guggenheim's The Art of This Century gallery.

In 1948, Hare, Barnett Newman, William Baziotes, Mark Rothko and Robert Motherwell founded the Subjects of the Artist School at 35 East 8th Street. Well attended lectures there were open to the public, with speakers such as Jean Arp, John Cage and Ad Reinhardt, but the art school failed financially and closed in the spring of 1949. Hare continued to be closely associated with influential artists and thinkers throughout the late 1940s and 1950s, counting Jean-Paul Sartre, Balthus, Alberto Giacometti, and Pablo Picasso among his friends and acquaintances. He belonged to the early generation of New York School Abstract Expressionist artists whose artistic innovation by the 1950s had been recognized across the Atlantic, including Paris. He participated from 1954 to 1957 in the invitational New York Painting and Sculpture Annuals. These Annuals were important because the participants were chosen by the artists themselves.

During the 1960s and 1970s Hare held teaching positions at several different schools, including the Philadelphia College of Art. During this period, he began work on his Cronus series of sculpture, paintings, and drawings, which became the subject of a solo show at New York's Guggenheim Museum in 1977. Marcel Duchamp was Hare’s best man at David’s third marriage, to photographer Denise Browne.

== Death and legacy ==
He died on December 21, 1992, in Jackson, Wyoming, after an emergency operation for an aortic aneurysm.

He was included in many Surrealist retrospectives, primarily represented by his sculpture and painting.
