= Peter Miller (artist) =

American surrealist painter

Henrietta Myers Miller (1913–1996), known professionally as Peter Miller, was an American surrealist painter. Her work is in the permanent collections of the Philadelphia Museum of Art and the Pennsylvania Academy of Fine Arts.

Miller has been called a "forgotten woman of American Modernism".

== Early life and education ==
Miller, born Henrietta Myers, was raised in Hanover, Pennsylvania where her family owned a horse farm. They also co-owned a newspaper and a shoe company.

She attended the Arlington Hall Junior School for Women after which she studied painting Pennsylvania Academy of Fine Arts.

== Career ==
In 1934, Miller traveled to Europe where she met Pablo Picasso, Henri Matisse, and Joan Miró. Miró greatly influenced Miller's painting style during the 1930s and 1940s.

Miller married artist C. Earle Miller in 1935. She took his last name and began signing her work using the name Peter Miller to avoid disclosing her gender. She first used the name 'Peter' during her exhibition at the Art Gallery of the Museum of New Mexico.

Miller had solo exhibitions at Julien Levy Gallery in 1944 and 1945. Her work was included in The Women, a June 1945 exhibition at Peggy Guggenheim’s Art of this Century Gallery that featured over thirty women artists. Others featured in the show included Lee Krasner and Nell Blane.

Miller and her husband lived in Chester County, Pennsylvania, and Española, New Mexico. Their ranch in Española bordered the San Ildefonso Pueblo which was inhabited by the Tewa people. Miller's work was greatly inspired by the Pueblo and Indigenous cultures.

Miller and her husband gifted their Miró painting, Horse, Pipe and Red Flower (Still Life with Horse) to the Philadelphia Museum of Art in 1986.

== Death ==
Miller died in Pennsylvania in 1996. Her husband died in 1991.

The couple, who had no children, left their Chester County, Pennsylvania property consisting of 250 acres to the Brandywine River Museum and Conservancy and gifted their property in Española to the San Ildefonso Pueblo.

The Millers bequeathed funds to the Philadelphia Museum of Art which were used to acquire art.

== Notable collections ==
- Untitled, 1960s, Philadelphia Museum of Art
- Dragonfly, Snake, and Turtle, 1968, Pennsylvania Academy of Fine Arts

== Notable exhibitions ==
- The Women, Peggy Guggenheim's Art of this Century Gallery
