= Julia Thecla =

American painter

- Born: Julia Thecla Connell; February 28, 1896; Delavan, Illinois
- Died: June 29, 1973 (aged 77); Chicago, Illinois
- Known for: Painting
- Movement: Magical Realism, Surrealism

Julia Thecla (February 28, 1896 – June 29, 1973) was an American artist based in Chicago in the 1930s and 1940s, working in the Surrealist and magical realist school of modern art.

== Early life and education ==
Thecla was born Julia Thecla Connell in the small town of Delavan, Illinois, the second-youngest of five children. Her artistic talents were evident early on, and she won first prize in a county drawing contest at age 12. After graduating from Delavan High School in 1913, she studied at Illinois State University in Normal for a summer. The university was then primarily a teacher's college, and due to high demand it was common for prospective teachers to study only for as long as they felt was needed to prepare themselves; Thecla subsequently taught students in the first through seventh grades at a rural schoolhouse in Tazewell County.

Around 1920, in her early 20s, she moved to Chicago, broke off ties with her family, and began using Thecla as her surname. She told various stories to explain the change. She studied for a total of two years at the School of the Art Institute of Chicago, periodically breaking off her studies to work.

== Artistic career ==
Thecla was primarily a watercolorist, and made extensive use of fantasy imagery; her work was often described as "jewel-like" or "enchanted". She worked almost exclusively with the female form, frequently using herself as a model.

Thecla's work was exhibited for the first time in 1931, at the annual International Watercolor Exhibition at the Art Institute of Chicago. Her works were subsequently exhibited there every year until 1936, and again from 1940 to 1944. Her work began to be shown nationwide in the 1940s, beginning at the Museum of Modern Art in New York City in 1943. Also in 1943, Thecla was included in Peggy Guggenheim's show Exhibition by 31 Women at the Art of This Century gallery in New York.

To support herself, Thecla periodically took paying work as an industrial artist, office worker, or art restorer; her work in restoration gave her skills in detail work that she also applied to her painting. From 1938 to 1942, she was employed by the Federal Art Project, a branch of the Works Progress Administration, in the "easel division".

Thecla wrote poetry throughout her career, but only published one poem during her lifetime, as she felt that poetry was a private affair. Her poems were lost when she was moved out of her home in 1969.

== Later life and legacy ==
After the mid-20th century, Thecla's work was largely forgotten. Reasons for this included the rising interest in abstraction, and the generally lower level of attention given to women artists, particularly those not associated with men. In addition, she had come to be viewed by many as mentally unstable, although later researchers have disputed this characterization. Nonetheless, Thecla continued painting until her vision began to deteriorate in her seventies. In 1969, she was forced to vacate the apartment where she had lived for many years due to renovation, and in the process she lost many of her possessions and supplies. She stayed with friends and family for a time, but in 1971 she was moved to a nursing home, and died there in 1973.

As of 2012, five of Thecla's works are held by the Art Institute of Chicago, although none of these are publicly displayed. The Chicago History Museum also owns one of Thecla's paintings.

In 2006, 35 Thecla paintings were shown in a special exhibit at the DePaul University Art Museum. The museum described Thecla as a forgotten Chicago artist, saying "her ethereal and sensuous portrayal of dreams, fairytales, and planetary realms were extraordinary explorations of alternative social orders."

In 2022, two of Julia Thecla's paintings were displayed in the Hirshhorn Museum's exhibit “Put It This Way: (Re)Visions of the Hirshhorn Collection,” including the 1952 work entitled Amorphous Ones.

== Works cited ==
- Holm, Erica L. (2001). "Thecla, Julia". In Schulz; Hast (eds.). Women Building Chicago, 1790-1990. Indiana University Press. pp. 873–875. ISBN 0253338522.
