= Eyre de Lanux =

American artist, writer, and designer (1894–1996)

- Portrait of Eyre de Lanux, 1925, by Man Ray
- Born: Elizabeth Eyre; March 20, 1894; Johnstown, Pennsylvania
- Died: September 8, 1996 (aged 102); New York, New York
- Known for: Design
- Movement: Art Deco
- Spouse: Pierre Combret de Lanux (m. 1918)
- Partner: Natalie Barney

Eyre de Lanux (/ɛər/ AIR; born Elizabeth Eyre; March 20, 1894 – September 8, 1996) was an American artist, writer, and designer. De Lanux is best known for designing lacquered furniture and geometric patterned rugs, in the art deco style, in Paris during the 1920s. She later illustrated a number of children's books. She died in New York at the age of 102.

== Early life, education and fine art ==
She was born in Johnstown, Pennsylvania, the eldest daughter of Richard Derby Eyre (1869-1955) and Elizabeth Krieger Eyre (d. 1938). She studied art at the Art Students League in Manhattan with Edwin Dickinson, George Bridgman, Robert Henri, and Charles Hawthorne.

De Lanux exhibited two paintings, L'Arlesienne and Allegro in the first annual exhibition of the Society of Independent Artists in 1917.

In 1918 she met and married, French writer and diplomat, Pierre Combret de Lanux (1887–1955) in New York. After the end of World War I they moved to Paris. She studied in Paris in the early 1920s at Académie Colarossi and Académie Ranson where her teachers included Maurice Denis, Demetrios Galanis, and Constantin Brâncuși. Their daughter, Anne-Françoise, nicknamed "Bikou," was born December 19, 1925.

In 1943, de Lanux was included in Peggy Guggenheim's show Exhibition by 31 Women at the Art of This Century gallery in New York.

== Personal relationships ==
When the newly married couple settled in Paris their social circle included André Gide, Ernest Hemingway, and Bernard Berenson. Though married, de Lanux was bisexual. She is best known as having been one of the many long-term lovers of lesbian writer and artist Natalie Barney. Her other lovers reportedly included Pierre Drieu La Rochelle and Louis Aragon.

Due in part to Jean Chalon's early biography of Barney, published in English as Portrait of a Seductress: The World of Natalie Barney, she has become more widely known for her many relationships than for her writing or her salon.

== Design ==
Her designs first came into notice during the early 1920s, and were often exhibited with those of designers Eileen Gray and Jean-Michel Frank. While still in France, she wrote short stories of her European travels. In 1955, her husband died. Shortly afterward, she returned to the U.S., and in the 1960s she wrote for Harper's Bazaar.

In her later years she wrote and illustrated a number of children's books. She died at the age of 102, at the Dewitt Nursing Home in Manhattan.
