= Theodoros Stamos =

Greek-American artist (1922–1997)

- (Θεόδωρος Στάμος)
- Born: December 31, 1922; New York City, New York, United States
- Died: February 2, 1997 (aged 74); Ioannina, Greece
- Education: American Artists School
- Known for: Painting
- Movement: Abstract expressionism

Theodoros Stamos (Greek: Θεόδωρος Στάμος) (December 31, 1922 – February 2, 1997) was a Greek-American painter. He is one of the youngest painters of the original group of abstract expressionist painters (the so-called "Irascibles"), which included William Baziotes, Adoplh Gottlieb, Lee Krasner, Barnett Newman, Jackson Pollock, Willem de Kooning, and Mark Rothko.

== Biography ==
Stamos was one of the original and youngest Abstract Expressionist artists working in New York City beginning in the 1940s. He was born on Manhattan's Lower East Side to Greek immigrant parents; his mother was from Sparta, and his father was raised in Lefkada. As a teenager, he won a scholarship to the American Artists School, where he studied sculpture with Simon Kennedy and Joseph Konzal. His instructor Joseph Solman, who was a member of the group The Ten, became a mentor to Stamos. At Solman's urging, Stamos visited Alfred Stieglitz's influential An American Place Gallery, where he encountered the work of Arthur Dove and Georgia O'Keeffe, among others. During this period, the late 1930s and early 1940s, Stamos held a variety of odd jobs: printer, florist, hat-blocker, and book salesman. Through one job, at Herbert Benevy's Gramercy Art frame shop on East 18th Street, he met members of the European avant-garde, including Arshile Gorky and Fernand Léger.

In 1943, when Stamos was 21 years old, Adoph Gottlieb and Barnett arranged for prominent dealer Betty Parsons to give him his first solo exhibition at her Wakefield Gallery and Bookshop in Manhattan. Parsons became an important ally and connection to the contemporary New York art world; Stamos would show regularly with her until 1957. By the mid-1940s, his career was becoming well established—he exhibited at the Whitney Museum annually from 1945 to 1951, at the Carnegie Institute and the Art Institute of Chicago in 1947, and at the Museum of Modern Art in 1948. Also during this period, Stamos' work began attracting the attention of collectors. The Museum of Modern art purchased Stamos' Sounds in the Rock in 1946. And Edward Wales Root, who became both a supporter of Stamos' career and a benefactor of the Munson-Williams-Proctor Institute, bought the first of many paintings from the artist in 1945.

The artist's paintings from the 1940s combine muted earth-toned colors with biomorphic imagery, suggesting geologic shapes or inchoate organic forms. This dovetails with Stamos' interest in natural history; as artist Barnett Newman observed in the introduction he wrotee to Stamos' 1947 exhibition with Betty Parsons Gallery, "His ideographs capture the moment of totemic affinity with the rock and the mushroom, the crayfish and the seaweed. He re-defines the pastoral experience as one of participation with the inner life of the natural phenomenon."

During the late 1940s he became a member of The Irascible Eighteen, a group of abstract painters who protested the Metropolitan Museum of Art's policy towards American painting of the 1940s and who posed for a famous picture in 1950; members of the group considered as the 'first generation' of abstract expressionists included: Willem de Kooning, Adolph Gottlieb, Ad Reinhardt, Hedda Sterne, Richard Pousette-Dart, William Baziotes, Jimmy Ernst, Jackson Pollock, James Brooks, Clyfford Still, Robert Motherwell, Bradley Walker Tomlin, Theodoros Stamos, Barnett Newman, and Mark Rothko. These artists are part of the New York School and they were referred to as The Irascibles in an article featured in an issue of Life where the infamous Nina Leen photograph was published.

Around 1950, Stamos began exploring a new series, inspired by East Asian aesthetics. He created his Tea House series of paintings, characterized by softly defined geometric forms painted with a limited palette and often overlaid by dark calligraphic brushwork. Later in the 1950s, Stamos worked with compositions that became increasingly reductive and simplified. He explored the use of layers of thin pigment, carefully worked, to create depth in his broad expanses of color.

Stamos traveled widely during his life. In 1947, he traveled by train to New Mexico and the Pacific Northwest. In 1948 and 49, he visited Europe, including Paris and Greece. For the next four decades, Stamos traveled widely and frequently, including to Egypt and Russia. Beginning in 1962, he created several long series of paintings. His Sun-Box series, begun in 1962, suggest a light-filled sun captured in rectangular areas. After 1971, he concentrated on a long and diverse series called Infinity Fields. The subtly painted colors and the variety of shapes are personal references to a wide range of places expressed in accompanied states of mind. Stamos's late paintings evoke such deeply personal states of mind in powerful painterly reds and yellows and shapes that conjure powerful emotions. They were inspired by the characteristics of the Greek island of Lefkada, where Stamos spent part of each year from 1970 until his death.

Stamos taught at Black Mountain College from 1950 until 1954 and from 1955 to 1975 he taught at the Art Students League of New York and the Cummington School of Fine Arts. Stamos was also a member of the Uptown Group. A year before his death he donated 43 of his works to the National Gallery of Greece. He is buried in Lefkada, Greece.

=== Rothko Case ===
Mark Rothko chose his friend, the painter Theodoros Stamos, as one of the executors of his estate. Stamos of course was in no way a legal authority, and unfortunately, it led to his involvement in the Rothko Case, which developed into a major lawsuit and scandal in the art world.

A little over a year after his suicide in 1970, Rothko's daughter sued the estate's executors, as well as the Marlborough Gallery, for waste and fraud. Over twelve years of litigation and appeals, it was revealed that many of Rothko's paintings, which had been sold or consigned by his estate to the Marlborough Gallery in Manhattan, were sold at deflated prices to favored clients while the gallery collected inflated commissions as high as 50 percent, compared with the 30 percent usually charged for an artist of his caliber; the executors divided the estate's proceeds from Marlborough as the fees for their work on the case. In the process, the executors were found liable and fined over $9 million; Stamos paid his share of the fine by signing over his house to the Rothko estate, while he was granted life tenancy. The case did much to enhance Rothko's reputation, but it did serious damage to the reputation of both Marlborough gallery and Stamos. Another perspective on the case was published in the New York Law Journal in 1988. Stamos's reputation and the value of his work have not yet recovered from the case. Many galleries would not represent his work. Such lack of support and negative publicity have resulted in continuing deflated pricing of his work until the present.

== See also ==
- Abstract Expressionism
- Art Students League of New York
- New York School
- Black Mountain College

== Sources ==
- Ralph Pomeroy, Stamos text by Ralph Pomeroy (New York, Abrams, (n.d.).) ISBN 0-8109-0487-X
- Marika Herskovic, American Abstract Expressionism of the 1950s An Illustrated Survey, (New York School Press, 2003.) ISBN 0-9677994-1-4. p. 318-321
- Marika Herskovic, New York School Abstract Expressionists Artists Choice by Artists, (New York School Press, 2000.) ISBN 0-9677994-0-6. p. 18; p. 38; p. 346-349
