= Buffie Johnson =

American painter

- The artist "Buffie at 30", Circa 1935, photograph by Edward Weston
- Born: February 12, 1912; New York, New York
- Died: August 11, 2006 (aged 94); New York, New York
- Known for: Painting
- Movement: Surrealism, Abstract Expressionism

Buffie Johnson (February 12, 1912 – August 11, 2006) was an American painter, associated with the Abstract Imagists.

== Biography ==
Born in New York City, Johnson studied in her youth at the Académie Julian in Paris and at the Art Students League of New York. She had lessons with Francis Picabia and Stanley William Hayter, and she earned a Master of Arts degree from the University of California, Los Angeles. In 1943, Johnson was included in Peggy Guggenheim's show Exhibition by 31 Women at the Art of This Century gallery in New York. From 1946 to 1950 she taught at the Parsons School of Design. She received many awards, including fellowships from Yaddo, the Bollingen Foundation, and the Edward Albee Foundation and her work appeared at the Whitney Biennial on multiple occasions. In 1988 she published Lady of the Beasts: Ancient Images of the Goddess and Her Sacred Animals. Twice married – her second husband was the critic Gerald Sykes – Johnson was survived by a daughter.

Johnson's work is include the Museum of Fine Arts, Boston, the San Francisco Museum of Modern Art, the Smithsonian American Art Museum, the Walker Art Center, the Whitney Museum of American Art, In 2016 her biography was included in the exhibition catalogue Women of Abstract Expressionism organized by the Denver Art Museum.

== Legacy ==
She was posthumously awarded the Lifetime Achievement Award for Women in the Arts 2007 by the College Art Association Committee on Women in the Arts (CWA) and the Women's Caucus for Art (WCA).

Johnson's image is included in the iconic 1972 poster Some Living American Women Artists by Mary Beth Edelson.

In 2023 her work was included in the exhibition Action, Gesture, Paint: Women Artists and Global Abstraction 1940-1970 at the Whitechapel Gallery in London.

Buffie Johnson is mentioned in Patricia Highsmith: Her Diaries and Notebooks, 1941–1995, edited by Anna von Planta, as having a brief relationship with Highsmith.
