= Xenia Cage =

American painter

- Xenia with one of her wood-frame and rice-paper mobiles, circa 1943
- Born: Xenia Andreyevna Kashevaroff; August 28, 1913; Juneau, Territory of Alaska, U.S.
- Died: September 26, 1995 (aged 82); New York, U.S.
- Known for: Painting; sculpture
- Movement: Surrealism
- Spouse: John Cage (m. 1935; div. 1945)

Xenia Cage (born Xenia Andreyevna Kashevaroff, August 28, 1913 – September 26, 1995) was an American surrealist sculptor. Her work has been described as on the "cutting edge of surrealism in sculpture" for her time.

== Early life and education ==
Xenia Kashevaroff was one of six daughters of Russian Orthodox priest Andrei Petrovich Kashevaroff (1863–1940) and Martha (née Bolshanin). While a teenager in high school in Monterey, California she had a relationship with marine biologist Ed Ricketts.

She studied art at Reed College in Portland, Oregon. While she was a student at Reed, she was the subject in many of Edward Weston's photographs.

== Career ==
Throughout her marriage to the musician and composer John Cage – from 1935 to 1945 – Xenia performed in his percussion ensemble. She is believed to have been the "female performer" who smashed a lime ricky bottle into a can of broken glass at the culmination of John Cage's Construction in Metal. In 1943, Cage exhibited an abstract mobile in Peggy Guggenheim's show Exhibition by 31 Women at the Art of This Century gallery in New York. The next year, Cage had a solo exhibition of her mobiles at the Julien Levy Gallery in New York. In 1947, she exhibited another abstract mobile called Black Trap at the Art Institute of Chicago's American Exhibition of Painting and Sculpture 58th Annual: Abstract and Surrealist American Art curated by Katharine Kuh. This piece was made from wood, paper, and string. Cage notably collaborated with artists Joseph Cornell and Marcel Duchamp as a bookbinder (she studied bookbinding with Hazel Dreis), and designed a chess table in tandem with a set created by Max Ernst.

By the 1950s, Cage had ceased to publicly exhibit her art, and worked at the Metropolitan Museum of Art in New York City and the Whitney Museum of American Art in Manhattan. She also worked as a conservator at the Cooper-Hewitt Museum in New York from 1968.

Cage helped Dave Brubeck get permission from Joan Miró to use one of his paintings as the cover for the 1961 album Time Further Out.

== Personal life ==
Xenia Kashevaroff met John Cage in January 1935 and he proposed marriage the same day. The wedding was on June 7, 1935. They divorced in 1945 when a ménage à trois with Merce Cunningham became a private affair between the two men, who remained together until John Cage's death. In a 1992 interview, John noted that their subsequent relationship had "not been particularly friendly", and said that due to her "barby" wit, "if I telephone her or write to her, I take my life in my hands". A pregnancy during the marriage ended in an abortion.

At her death in 1995, "she was not a forgotten artist, but tragically, an unknown one", with virtually none of her artwork known to have survived. Her friend and erstwhile musical collaborator Jean Erdman paid for her funeral. Her grave is in the family plot at the Evergreen Cemetery in Juneau.
