= Andrew Kashevaroff =

Russian orthodox priest in Alaska (1863–1940)

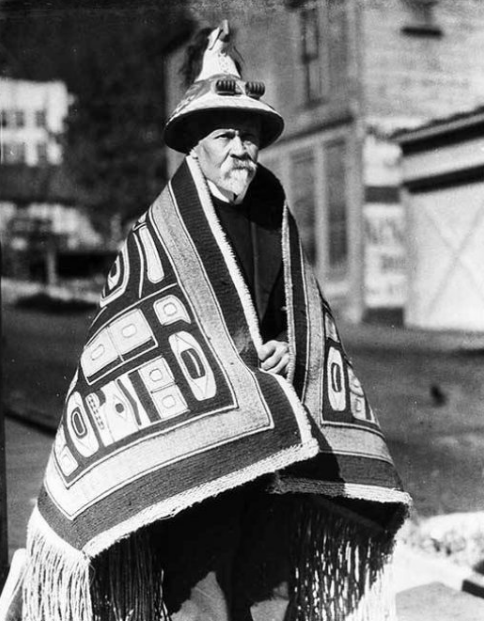
Andrew Kashevaroff wearing Tlingit attire

Andrew Kashevaroff (September 19, 1863 – April 3, 1940; also known under his Russian name Андрей Петрович Кашеваров, Andrei Petrovich Kashevarov) was a priest in the Russian Orthodox Church in Alaska, as well as a schoolteacher and an amateur historian and an ethnologist, the head and curator of the territory’s ethnographic and historical museum and library. He was of mixed Russian and native Alaskan Creole ancestry.

Kashevaroff worked to preserve Alaska's cultural heritage by collecting artifacts and documenting the history and ethnology of Alaska's peoples. He served as President of the Juneau Men's Igloo in 1927.

Kashevaroff served as a founder, fundraiser, and, for many years, the museum's sole employee. His background allowed him to navigate both Russian and Native Alaskan cultures while contributing to broader American historical and cultural understanding. Over his tenure, he amassed thousands of artifacts and authored numerous works on Alaskan history and ethnology.

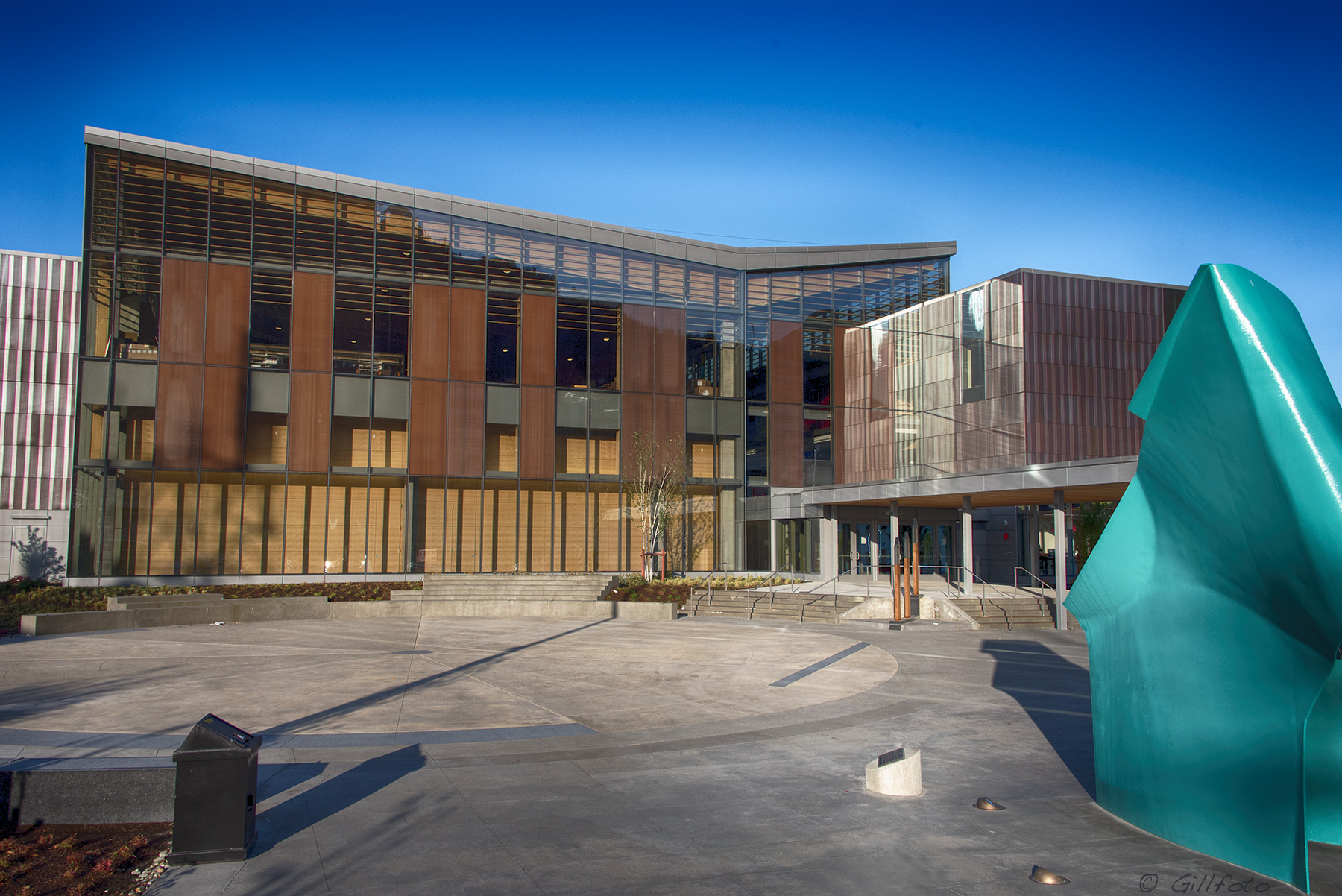
The Andrew P. Kashevaroff building

In 2015, the state of Alaska named its new State Libraries, Archives, and Museum building of the Alaska State Museum in Juneau in his honor.

== See also ==
- Xenia Cage, American artist, one of his six daughters
