= Jacqueline Lamba =

French painter (1910–1993)

Jacqueline Lamba Breton
- Jacqueline Lamba Breton, 1930, photograph by Man Ray
- Born: Jacqueline Lamba; 17 November 1910; Saint-Mandé, French Third Republic
- Died: 20 July 1993 (aged 82); Rochecorbon, France
- Other names: Jacqueline Lamba Breton, Jacqueline Lamba-Breton
- Known for: Painting
- Movement: Surrealism
- Spouses: André Breton (m. 1934; div. 1943) David Hare (m. 1946; div. 1955)
- Children: Aube Elléouët-Breton, Merlin Meredith Hare

Jacqueline Lamba (17 November 1910 – 20 July 1993) was a French painter and surrealist artist. She was married to the surrealist André Breton.

== Biography ==
Lamba was born in the Paris suburb of Saint-Mandé, on 17 November 1910 (contrary to at least one source she was not American). Her mother was a talented and well-read woman who had once intended entering medical school, but instead was persuaded into the common woman's role as a housewife. She always spoke highly of her father as well, whom she never had the chance to get to know very well. Her father, José Lamba, died in an automobile accident in 1914, when Lamba was three years old, and her mother, Jane Pinon, died of tuberculosis in 1927. Jacqueline Lamba's love for art began as a little girl growing up in Paris and frequently visiting the Louvre with her mother and sister. (Grimberg, p. 5) At the Palais Galliera, she saw exhibitions of decorative arts, printed fabrics, and painted paper. This delighted her and proved to be decisive in her formation as a visual artist. (Grimberg, p. 5)

Light was very important to Jacqueline, as she often said,

"The object is only a part of space created by light. Color is its non-arbitrary choice in trans-figuration. Texture is the crystallization of this choice. The line does not exist, it is already form. Shadow does not exist, it is already light".

During Lamba's early life, and into late adolescence, she had worn pants, cropped her hair and referred to herself as "Jacko." This nickname and change in appearance seemed to have been the result of her parents' disappointment after receiving a girl at birth, Lamba, and not a boy. Like her mother, Lamba was well-read and had very educated opinions. However, she also had a temper that earned her the nickname "Bastille Day." After attending the Ecole de L'Union Central des Art Decoratifs from 1926 to 1929, she worked as a textile and paper designer as well as in advertising for multiple companies before becoming a painter due to her inspiration drawn from other artists, such as Maurice Denis. Jacqueline Lamba would eventually become known for being a painter and draughtswoman later in life.

== Relationship with André Breton ==
While attending the Ecole des Arts Décoratifs, an art university, she joined the French Communist Party. Following her mother's death, Lamba moved into a "Home for Young Women," run by nuns, on the Rue de l'Abbaye. During this time she supported herself by doing decorative designs for various department stores. After graduating from the Ecole des Arts Decoratifs it was suggested to her, by a cousin, that she should read a book by André Breton, the leader of Surrealism. After reading some of his books she exclaimed, "I was just astonished, it was not the surrealism that interested me. It was what Breton was saying, because he was saying things that affected me, exactly what I was thinking, and I had no doubt that we were going to meet one way or another." (Grimberg, p. 6)

In 1925, she entered the Ecole des Arts Décoratifs from which she graduated in 1929. Here, she met fellow female surrealist Dora Maar, who later stated: "I was closely linked with Jacqueline. She asked me, 'where are those famous surrealists?' and I told her about Café de la Place Blanche". Lamba then began to frequent the café and, on 29 May 1934, met Breton, whom she would meet for the second time after one of her performances as a nude underwater dancer at the Coliseum on rue Rochechouart. Breton later wrote about this encounter in his book titled, Mad Love, in which he described Lamba as a "scandalously beautiful" woman. They were married in a joint ceremony with Paul Éluard and Nusch Éluard, three months after the night at the Café de la Place Blanche, and the sculptor Alberto Giacometti served as their best man. She would continue to appear frequently in the poetry of Breton throughout the rest of their relationship.

Lamba and Breton were wanted by the Nazis; in Marseille they met Varian Fry. Carrying infant Aube in her arms they were snuck over the Pyrenees for safe passage to America. A letter she wrote to Maar in June 1940, after she and Breton fled Vichy France during the Nazi occupation, reveals a lot about her life. In it she writes about having to leave her sister, Huguette, back in Paris. She asks about their other friends, Benjamin Péret and Remedios Varo, and says that they are living on a tiny fisherman's shack "of great impoverished beauty" on the beach of Martigues.

They had a daughter, Aube Elléouët Breton named after the dawn, but separated in 1943. She found herself often overshadowed by her male counterpart. "As Breton's spouse," scholar Salomon Grimberg writes, "she remained nameless, and always referred to as 'her' or as 'the woman who inspired,' or as 'Breton's wife'."

== Art exhibitions and travels ==
Breton was infatuated by Lamba, whose innate attention to light drew him to be attracted to both her and her works. They collaborated on some works, such as Le Petit Mimetique (1936), a piece representing an aspect of surrealism that involves the mimicry of nature.

On 6 September 1936 Lamba left her home in Paris for Ajaccio, France leaving Breton and their eight-month old daughter. She left at other points in their marriage as well but always returned to work on her and Bretons relationship. In 1939, during one of Jaqueline Lamba's breaks from Andre Breton, she ventured to the Midi beach in Cannes with Pablo Picasso and Dora Maar. Picasso drew the two women in his work Night Fish-ing in Antibes (1939).

Lamba participated in the Surrealist Movement between 1934 and 1947. In 1943, Lamba was included in Peggy Guggenheim's show Exhibition by 31 Women at the Art of This Century gallery in New York.

After seven months in Mexico, spent with Diego Rivera and Frida Kahlo, Lamba and Kahlo become friends. Both struggled for their own artistic identities amidst turbulent marriages to famous men. Kahlo captured her friends trepidation in the 1943 painting The Bride Frightened at the Seeing Life Opened - Lamba depicted as a tiny doll among larger, flayed-open fruit echoing the shapes of male and female genitalia. A quote from Jacqueline lends us a small look inside the domestic life of the famed couple Breton and Lamba with daughter, Aube. "Breton earned little and collected compulsively". She recalls with acrimony about "years spent with no money, surrounded by a priceless collection". (Grimberg, p. 6)

Jacqueline Lamba's had her first one-woman show in New York City at the Norlyst Gallery in April 1944. It included eleven oil paintings, six papers, and her still surrealist short "ars poetica."

== Relationship with David Hare ==
Following her separation from Breton, Lamba married David Hare, an American sculptor. It is claimed she had a sexual affair with fellow artist Frida Kahlo.

Unlike Andre Breton, who was considered to be tone deaf, Jacqueline Lamba was able to speak fluent English. She became the main translator for VVV, the magazine that Breton founded, and a translator for all those connected to the VVV. It was during her work at VVV that she met David Hare, the editor for the magazine. She would leave Andre Breton for David Hare in 1942 and move to Roxbury, Connecticut with him. Because of an inheritance, they both could live comfortably. They exhibited art together at the San Francisco Museum of Modern Art, during August and September 1946. It was titled, "Painting by Jacqueline Lamba and Sculpture by David Hare". (Grimberg, p. 11) Together they had a son, Meredith Merlin Hare. (Grimberg, p. 11)

Due to Hare's use of drugs and many girlfriends, the marriage ended in 1954. Jacqueline moved back to France. Hare did continue to send money to Jacqueline every month for the next 42 years.(Grimberg, p11) In 1955 Lamba divorced Hare and returned to Paris.

After being married twice, Jacqueline shared with a friend that "she had painted surrealism to please Breton and expressionists landscapes to please Hare, and now she was painting for herself". (Grimberg, p. 11) Her friends noticed her painting strokes were very gentle, not harsh at all. (Grimberg, p. 12) Living alone by choice, her paintings were complex city scapes, detailed and momentous at the same time and would take months to complete. (Grimberg, p. 12)

== End of life ==
For the last five years of her life, Lamba had Alzheimer's disease. Toward the end of her life, Lamba suffered a stroke.

She eventually asked her daughter and son to relocate her to the countryside in Rochecorbon where she spent her final years. Her children, Aube and Merlin honored her request to move her to a retirement home. There she settled into an 18th-century French chateau and while there, "made art until she could no longer hold a pencil". (Grimberg, p. 12) Her continued interest in light is made evident on her gravestone, "Jacqueline Lamba 1910–1993, "the night of the sunflower" (Svododa). "La nuit du tournesol" is the title of the poem by Andre Breton that attracted Jacqueline to him. It describes a night in which the poet walks through Les Halles in Paris and encounters a beautiful woman near a flower stall of sunflowers. Aube, Jacqueline's daughter with Breton, chose it for her mother's epitaph.

== See also ==
- Transatlantic (portrayal in 2023 TV series)
