= Kay Sage =

American Surrealist artist, poet (1898–1963)

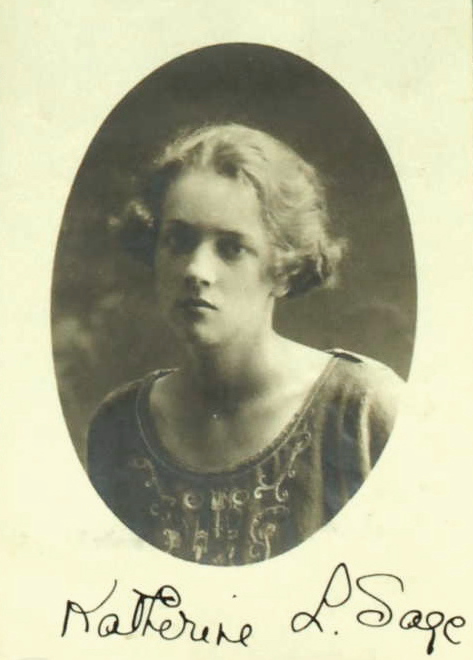
- Signed passport photo, 1922
- Born: Katherine Linn Sage; June 25, 1898; Albany, New York, United States
- Died: January 8, 1963 (aged 64); Woodbury, Connecticut, United States
- Known for: Painting
- Movement: Surrealism
- Spouse(s): Ranieri Bourbon del Monte Santa Maria, Prince of San Faustino (m. 1925; sep. 1935) Yves Tanguy (m. 1940; died 1955)

Katherine Linn Sage (June 25, 1898 – January 8, 1963), usually known as Kay Sage, was an American Surrealist artist and poet active between 1936 and 1963. A member of the Golden Age and post-war periods of Surrealism, she is mostly recognized for her artistic works, which typically contain themes of an architectural nature.

Through her marriage to an Italian prince, she became princess of San Faustino in 1925. She was also the sister-in-law of Donna Virginia Bourbon del Monte, wife of industrialist Edoardo Agnelli of the Agnelli family.

== Biography ==
Sage was born in Albany, New York, into a family made wealthy from the timber industry. Her father, Henry M. Sage, was a state assemblyman the year after her birth and later was a five-term state senator. Her mother was Anne Wheeler (Ward) Sage. Sage had an elder sister, Anne Erskine Sage.

=== Early life ===
Anne Wheeler Ward Sage left her husband and older daughter soon after Kay's birth to live and travel in Europe with Kay as her companion. She and Henry Sage divorced in 1908, but Henry Sage continued to support his ex-wife and younger daughter, and Kay visited him and his new wife in Albany occasionally and wrote him frequent letters.

Asymmetrically placed large foreground forms emphasize distance in Danger, Construction Ahead of 1940. Oil on canvas 111.8 x 157.5 cm (44 x 62 in. )

Kay and her mother established a home in Rapallo, Italy, but visited many other places as well, including Paris. Katherine became fluent in French and Italian, speaking colloquial versions of these languages that she learned from the servants who helped to raise her. She attended a number of schools, including the Foxcroft School in Virginia, where she became a lifelong friend of the heiress Flora Payne Whitney.

As a child she drew and wrote as hobbies, but her first formal training in painting was at the Corcoran Art School in Washington, D.C., in 1919–1920. After she and her mother went back to Italy in 1920, she studied art in Rome for several years, learning conventional techniques and styles. She particularly enjoyed painting outdoors in the Roman Campagna with teacher Oronato Carlandi and fellow students. Much later, Sage stated that "these were the happiest days of my life", and she told friend and gallery owner Julien Levy in 1961 that her campagna experience shaped her "perspective idea of distance and going away." Nonetheless, in later years Sage usually claimed that she was self-taught perhaps because, as one of her biographers, Judith Suther, states, most of what she had learned in Rome bore so little relationship to the kind of painting she eventually did that "she felt as if she had studied with no one."

Sage met a young Italian nobleman, Ranieri Bourbon del Monte Santa Maria, Prince di San Faustino, in Rome around 1923 and fell in love with him, believing at first, as she wrote to a friend in 1924, that he was "me in another form." They married on March 30, 1925. For ten years the couple lived the idle life of upper-class Italians, which Sage later described as "a stagnant swamp." She looked back on that time as years that she simply "threw away to the crows. No reason, no purpose, nothing." Her husband was content with their lifestyle, but Sage was not: as she wrote in her autobiography, China Eggs, "Some sort of inner sense in me was reserving my potentialities for something better and more constructive."

=== Surrealism and Tanguy ===
In Margin of Silence of 1942, forms are figurative, static, and draped. The dark background alludes to feelings of unease with these figures in the foreground.

Perhaps spurred by the deaths of her father in 1933 and her sister, from tuberculosis, in 1934 (Anne had joined Kay and her mother in Italy in the 1920s, and the sisters became quite close during Anne's final illness), Sage left her husband in 1935 with plans to build an independent life as an artist; they obtained a papal annulment of their marriage several years later. In December 1936, as she prepared to leave Italy and move to Paris, Sage had her first solo art exhibit, six oil paintings shown at the Galleria del Milione in Milan. In A House of Her Own, her 1997 biography of Sage, Judith Suther describes these works as "experimental abstract compositions."

Sage moved to Paris in March 1937 and rented a luxurious apartment there. In early 1938 she saw the International Surrealist Exhibit at Galerie Beaux-Arts; consisting of 299 pieces by 60 artists from 14 countries. She was especially struck by the paintings of Italian artist Giorgio de Chirico, which featured what Magdalena Holzhey, in a book devoted to de Chirico, calls "empty squares and receding depths, shadowy arcades and soaring towers." Sage bought one of de Chirico's paintings, La Surprise, and kept it all her life.

This exposure to Surrealism inspired Sage to begin painting in earnest. She exhibited six of her new oils in the Salon des Surindépendants show at the Porte de Versailles in the fall of 1938. These semiabstract paintings, including Afterwards and The World Is Blue, borrowed motifs and styles from de Chirico and the Surrealists but showed hints of Sage's own future work as well. Art historian Whitney Chadwick states that Sage's paintings were "imbued with an aura of purified form and a sense of motionlessness and impending doom found nowhere else in Surrealism." Around this time the artist began signing her works "Kay Sage."

Several stories are told about Sage's meeting with her future husband, Surrealist artist Yves Tanguy. One came from Greek poet Nicolas Calas, who recalled that he and Tanguy accompanied Surrealist leader André Breton to the Surindépendants exhibit and were impressed enough by Sage's paintings to seek her out. Calas claimed that Breton was sure that the paintings must have been made by a man.

Tanguy at the time was married to Jeannette Ducroq, but they were separated, and he and Sage immediately fell in love. Sage, still well off, was generous with her money and the group of impoverished artists badly needed such support, but some resented her wealth and what they felt was a haughty attitude that fitted her former title of "Princess" all too well. Her alliance with Tanguy contributed to a rift between Tanguy and Breton, who had formerly been close friends. Nonetheless, Sage continued to call herself a Surrealist.

Germany invaded Poland in September 1939, beginning World War II, and Sage sailed back to the United States a month later. She immediately set up plans to help the Surrealists immigrate as well and establish themselves in the new country by means of art exhibitions—starting with Tanguy, who joined her in New York City in November. She arranged for Tanguy to have a solo show at the New York gallery of Pierre Matisse, son of the famous painter Henri Matisse, a month after he arrived. Sage had her own solo show, her first in the United States, at the same gallery in June 1940. Sage and Tanguy married on August 17, 1940, in Reno, Nevada, after he obtained a final divorce from duCroq.

=== Mature work ===
Sage did the bulk of her mature work between 1940, when she married Tanguy, and 1955, when he died suddenly from a cerebral hemorrhage. During most of that time the two artists lived at Town Farm in Woodbury, Connecticut. (They leased a house in the area beginning in 1941 but maintained a New York apartment for a while as well; in 1946 they purchased the farm and moved to Woodbury permanently.) They converted a barn on the farm into his-and-hers studios, separated by a partition with a door. Their large home was decorated with numerous pieces of Surrealist art and a variety of unusual objects, including a stuffed raven in a cage and an Eskimo mask.

Although the Tanguys visited, and were visited by, many members of both the French expatriate and American art communities, such as mobile designer Alexander Calder and his family, they had difficulty keeping close friends. "Again and again Sage is described [by people who knew her] as imperious, forbidding, moody, quick to anger, remote, private, solitary, aloof, contradictory, and unapproachable," Judith Suther writes. Tanguy, though friendlier, became notorious for his behavior when drunk, which included grabbing the heads of other men at a gathering and striking them hard and repeatedly with his own.

During these years Sage's art gained a solid reputation among art critics, though she found it difficult to emerge from the shadow of the better-known Tanguy. Her work was regularly included in national exhibits, won prizes, and was sold to major art museums. In 1943, Sage's work was included in Peggy Guggenheim's show Exhibition by 31 Women at the Art of This Century gallery in New York. She had several solo shows at the galleries of Julien Levy and, beginning in 1950, Catherine Viviano in New York. In the Third Sleep won the Watson F. Blair Purchase Prize from the Art Institute of Chicago in October 1945, Sage's first major public recognition. In 1951, All Soundings Are Referred to High Water won first prize in oils at the Eastern States Exposition of Connecticut Contemporary Art, and Nests of Lightning won first honorable mention in the 22nd Corcoran Biennial Exhibition of Contemporary American Painting. Sage and Tanguy had a large joint exhibition at the Wadsworth Atheneum in Hartford, Connecticut—their first and almost only exhibition together—in August and September 1954.

=== Last years and death ===
In Tomorrow Is Never of 1955, rudiments of architecture enclose suggestions of human forms within.

The relationship between Kay Sage and Yves Tanguy was as enigmatic as their art. At the same parties during which he banged his head against those of other men, Tanguy assaulted Sage verbally and sometimes physically, pushing her and sometimes even threatening her with a knife. Sage, according to friends' accounts, made no response to her husband's aggression except to try to persuade him to go home. Friends also said that Tanguy did not like Sage's painting and felt jealous of the fame that came to her. However contentious or abusive their relationship was, Sage was devastated by Tanguy's death. "Yves was my only friend who understood everything," she wrote to Jehan Mayoux, an old friend of Tanguy's, about a month after Tanguy's fatal stroke.

Sage did fewer new paintings after Tanguy died, partly because of her depression and partly because of her decreasing eyesight due to cataracts. Instead, she devoted her time to two projects: preserving Tanguy's reputation through retrospective shows and a complete catalogue of his work, and writing poetry, mostly in the slangy French she had learned in her youth and spoken with Tanguy. With the help of longtime friend Marcel Duhamel—and her own subsidies to cover most of the printing costs—Sage arranged for a book of this poetry, Demain, Monsieur Silber, to be published in France in June 1957. Around 1955 she also wrote a partial autobiography, China Eggs, which covered her life up to about the time she left San Faustino, but she never tried to publish it.

One of the chief paintings in a show of 13 of Sage's oils at the Viviano Gallery in November 1958 was called The Answer Is No. This seems to have reflected Sage's own state of mind. She filed her will in Waterbury in December 1958, and on April 28–29, 1959, a few weeks after she completed a massive catalogue of Tanguy's paintings, she attempted to end her life with an overdose of sleeping pills. A housekeeper found her, however, and she was revived.

In 1959 and 1960 she underwent operations to remove her cataracts, which she had formerly refused to do. Unfortunately, the surgeries were painful and had only limited success, and by this time she was suffering from other health problems as well, including some that may have resulted from her years of heavy smoking and drinking. During 1960 and 1961, as a substitute for painting, she made small sculptures of wire, stones, bullets, and other unusual materials. Catherine Viviano hosted a show of these objects, titled "Your Move," in November 1961, as well as a major retrospective show of Sage's paintings in April 1960.

Sage wrote in a journal in August 1961, "I have said all that I have to say. There is nothing left for me to do but scream." On January 8, 1963, she put a fatal bullet through her heart. Following instructions in her will, Pierre Matisse buried urns containing Sage's and Tanguy's ashes in the water off the coast of Tanguy's native Brittany in 1964.

== Art and writing ==
=== Poetry and writing ===
Kay Sage is known chiefly as a visual artist. However, she also wrote five volumes of poetry, chiefly in French, including Faut dire c'qui est, in September 1959. She wrote four short plays and an unpublished autobiography, China Eggs.

=== Artistic style ===
In the painting "Unusual Thursday" of 1951, a jumble of objects in the foreground is contrasted with a latticework bridge leading off into the distance.

Kay Sage consistently identified herself as a Surrealist, and authors who have written about her usually do so as well. One of her biographers, Judith Suther, writes:

I call Kay Sage a Surrealist because her painting resonates with the unsettling paradoxes and hallucinatory qualities prized by André Breton and his group. . . . More fundamentally, I call Sage a Surrealist because her allegiance to the Surrealist identity lies at the heart of her self-image as an artist.

Critics during Sage's lifetime frequently compared her work to that of Tanguy, who was better known, and usually assumed that, when their work had features in common, those features must have originated with him. More recent feminist scholars have stated that the influence more likely was mutual—what Judith Suther calls "a constant, usually unconscious interchange." Suther and others also point out differences between the two artists: for example, the large architectural constructions that dominate Sage's paintings are quite unlike the smaller biomorphic or metallic forms that people associate with Tanguy's landscapes.

Both Suther and Régine Tessier, the latter in a sketch of Sage in Notable American Women: The Modern Period, note key features of Sage's mature work. Most of Sage's paintings focus on free-standing architectural structures, including walls, towers, and latticework, which could represent buildings either under construction or ruined and decaying. Her use of arched entryways and slanted perspectives may in be attributed to the painter Giorgio de Chirico. Some contain figures that might or might not be human, hidden by flowing drapery. (Le Passage, one of Sage's last paintings, is perhaps the only one containing a definite human figure; even Small Portrait, thought by many to be a self-portrait, is hardly recognizable as a face.) Like Tanguy, Sage often sets her objects on deserts or plains that recede to immeasurably distant horizons. She renders her forms in meticulous, photographic detail, using a gray-green-ochre palette that Tessier describes as "reminiscent of the sulphurous light before a thunderstorm". Critics frequently called Sage's work disturbing or depressing, even when they praised her painterly skill.

Sage almost never commented on what her paintings represented or how their seemingly ominous mood should be interpreted. One exception was her statement to a Time magazine critic that The Instant, a painting that appeared in her 1950 show at the Catherine Viviano gallery, was "a sort of showing of what's inside—things half mechanical, half alive."

=== Artworks ===
- A Little Later (1938)
- An important event (1938)
- Noone Heard Thunder (1939)
- My Room Has Two Doors (1939)
- This Morning (painting)|This Morning (1939)
- Tumble-weed (1939)
- Lost Record (1940)
- I Walk without Echo (1940)
- Danger, Construction Ahead (1940)
- I Have No Shadow (1940)
- White Silence (1941)
- Margin of Silence (1942)
- The Fourteen Daggers (1942)
- At The Appointed Time (1942)
- Minutes #8 (1943)
- The Hidden Letter (1943)
- Too Soon for Thunder (1943)
- From Another Approach (1944)
- I Saw Three Cities (1944)
- In the 3rd Sleep (1944)
- The Upper Side of the Sky (1944)
- Other Answers (1945)
- Journey to Go (1945)
- Festa (1947)
- On The First of March Crows Begin to Search (1947)
- Arithmetic of Wind (1947)
- All Soundings Are Referred to High Water (1947)
- Ring of Iron, Ring of Wool (1947)
- The Unicorns Came Down From the Sea (1947)
- The Seven Sleepers (1947)
- Starlings, Caravans (1948)
- The Instant (1949)
- The Morning Myth (1950)
- Small Portrait (1950)
- Men Working (1951)
- Nests of Lightning (1951)
- Tomorrow for Example (1951)
- Apostrophe (1951)
- Unusual Thursday (1951)
- On the Contrary (1952)
- Dreamy Cars of Waterbury (1952)
- Third Paragraph (1953)
- No Passing (1954)
- Hyphen (1954)
- A Bird in the Room (1955)
- Tomorrow is Never (1955)
- Journal of a Conjuror (1955)
- Le Passage (1956)
- South to Southwesterly Winds Tomorrow (1957)
- The World of Why (1958)
- No Winds, no Birds (1958)
- Watching the Clock (1958)
- The Answer Is No (1958)
- Passionnément, pas du tout (1961)
- Passe ou Manque (1961)
- Tacaii (1962)

=== Exhibitions ===
- 1936, Galleria del Milione, Milan, Italy (six oils) (actually a three-person exhibition: see S. R. Miller's 2011 and 2018 publications below).
- 1938, Salon des Surindependants, Paris, France (six oils)
- 1940, Pierre Matisse Gallery, New York (17 oils, solo show); Tone Price gallery, Los Angeles (13 oils, solo show); San Francisco Museum of Art, San Francisco (13 oils, part of group show)
- 1944, Julien Levy gallery, New York (18 oils, solo show)
- 1947, Julien Levy gallery, New York (11 oils, solo show)
- 1950, Catherine Viviano gallery, New York (14 oils, solo show)
- 1951, Corcoran Gallery, Washington, D.C.
- 1952, Catherine Viviano gallery, New York (14 oils, solo show)
- 1954, Wadsworth Atheneum, Hartford, Connecticut (46 works, joint show with Yves Tanguy)
- 1956, Catherine Viviano gallery, New York (12 oils, solo show)
- 1960, Catherine Viviano gallery, New York (59 works, solo retrospective)
- 1961, Catherine Viviano gallery, New York (small Surrealist sculptures, titled "Your Move")
- 1965, Mattatuck Museum, Waterbury, Connecticut (memorial exhibit of 50 works, titled "A Tribute to Kay Sage")
- 1977, Herbert F. Johnson Museum of Art, Cornell University, Ithaca, New York (65 works, solo retrospective)
- 2011, The Katonah Museum of Art, Katonah, New York (25 works, joint show with Yves Tanguy)
- 2012, Featured in the exhibition In Wonderland: The Surrealist Adventures of Women Artists in Mexico and the United States at the Los Angeles County Museum of Art.

=== Books ===
In addition to her autobiography, China Eggs, and four Surrealist one-act plays, Sage wrote several books of poetry, three in French, one in English and one in Italian. There are also more than two hundred unpublished poems in the Archives of American Art (Flora Whitney Miller Papers, and sixty unpublished poems in the Stephen Robeson Miller Research Papers about Kay Sage, see citation below.) Their style is colloquial, their wit sharp and often directed at herself. Many are dialogues, perhaps imagined conversations with Tanguy (with whom she spoke the same kind of street-language French she used in the poems) or perhaps discussions between different parts of herself. Her published works are:

- Piove in giardino (1937)
- Demain, Monsieur Silber (1957)
- The More I Wonder (1957, probably a translation into English of Demain, Monsieur Silber)
- Faut dire c'qui est (1959)
- Mordicus (1962)

== See also ==
- Women Surrealists

== Suggested reading ==
- Chadwick, Whitney. Women Artists and the Surrealist Movement. New York: Thames and Hudson, 1985.
- Hubert, Renée Riese. "The Silent Couple: Kay Sage and Yves Tanguy," in her Magnifying Mirrors: Women, Surrealism, and Partnership. Lincoln: University of Nebraska Press, 1997, pp. 173–198.
- Mattatuck Museum Historical Society. "A Tribute to Kay Sage." Mattatuck, Conn.: Mattatuck Museum, 1965.
- Miller, Stephen Robeson. "The Surrealist Imagery of Kay Sage" Art International, Lugano, Switzerland, v. 26, September–October 1983, pp. 32–47; 54–56.
- Miller, Stephen Robeson. "In the Interim: the Constructivist Surrealism of Kay Sage" in Surrealism and Women, edited by Mary Ann Caws, MIT Press, Cambridge, Massachusetts, 1991. Mentions the author's illustrated Kay Sage Catalogue Raisonne, in which the works are arranged chronologically, on microfilm at the Archives of American Art (see below).
- Miller, Stephen Robeson. Double Solitaire: The Surreal Worlds of Kay Sage and Yves Tanguy. Katonah, N. Y.: Katonah Museum of Art/Mint Museum, 2011–2012. One of Miller's books, Kay Sage: The Biographical Chronology and Four Surrealist One-Act Plays (2011) is, despite its title, an abridged version of the 100 page Chronology by Miller on microfilm at the Archives of American, and as such is approx. 50 pages of text. In his essay in this publication, Jonathan Stuhlman demonstrably shows just how Sage influenced Tanguy's work.
- Miller, Stephen Robeson. Kay Sage: The Biographical Chronology and Four Surrealist One-Act Plays, New York: Gallery of Surrealism, 2011. (Note: In 1976, Marcel Duhamel, Sage's literary executor in France, six months before his death, gave her four Surrealist one-act plays to Stephen Robeson Miller with the understanding that the latter would eventually publish them. First listed in Books in Print in 1995 as "date not set" with a Boston, Massachusetts, publisher (Nelmar Press), it was decided to publish these plays to coincide with an exhibition, and therefore they were eventually published by the Gallery of Surrealism, New York, to coincide with the Sage and Tanguy exhibition at the Katonah Museum of Art, Katonah, New York, cited above, of which Miller was curator. Miller included with the plays a fifty-page abridged version, with revisions, of his 1983 one-hundred page chronology in the Archives of American Art on microfilm reel nos. 2886-2888 which extensively incorporated selected quotations from his interviews and correspondence with people who knew Sage and which forms part of the collection named by the AAA "The Stephen Robeson Miller Research Papers about Kay Sage, 1898–1983". Additionally, included for each year in the 2011 Chronology, is the source for each quotation/entry as well as a list of the titles of the works she had executed during that year, thereby making it a catalogue raisonne of Sage's Surrealist works "without illustrations" (see below).
- Miller, Stephen Robeson. "Illustrated Catalogue Raisonne of the Surrealist Art of Kay Sage" on microfilm at the Archives of American Art, Smithsonian Institution, Washington, D.C., 1983, in which the works appear chronologically, permitted the inclusion of a number of works published in newspapers from Sage's personal scrapbooks that do not appear in the 2018 catalogue raisonne because there were no "digital images" of them. Additionally, an image of Sage's only print, a lithograph she contributed to the Galerie Maeght, Paris, for its exhibition Le Surrealisme en 1947, appears on Miller's microfilmed 1983 Sage Catalogue Raisonne, but unfortunately not in the 2018 Catalogue Raisonne published by Delmonico/Prestel Verlag. (Stephen Robeson Miller also regrets that in his Chronology in the Kay Sage Catalogue Raisonne, published in 2018, there was not time before the book went to press to include the following correction: Sage saw her first Tanguy painting Je vous attends (I await you), 1934, at the Galerie Charpentier in Paris in January 1935, not at the same gallery during the summer of 1936. Proof of this information is the checklist of the exhibition called "Le Temps Present: Peinture, Sculpture, Gravure: 1er Exposition de 1935" held from January 10–28 at the Galerie Charpentier, Paris, with Tanguy's painting listed as number 232, which Dr. Charles Stuckey at the Pierre Matisse Foundation, New York, located at the Metropolitan Museum of Art and provided to Mr. Miller).
- Rosenberg, Karen. "A House of Her Own: Kay Sage, Solitary Surrealist." Women's Review of Books, v. 15 i. 6 (March 1998), p. 4 ff.
- Suther, Judith D. A House of Her Own: Kay Sage, Solitary Surrealist. Lincoln: University of Nebraska Press, 1997. The author stated in her Acknowledgements that Miller had abandoned his book on Sage, but this was not possible because Miller's citation in Books in Print with Nelmar Press predated Suther's 1997 citation in Books in Print, and demonstrated his plan to publish further. Although Miller and Suther had briefly discussed collaborating on a book about Sage, their collaboration never materialized because Miller decided he wanted to do his own book, namely a catalogue raisonne with his commentary about her paintings, Sage's unpublished one-act plays, and his one-hundred page Chronological Biography in the Archives of American Art. Miller's shorter, abridged (fifty page) 2011 Chronology published by the Gallery of Surrealism, New York, provides the source for each entry and includes, for example, a letter Sage wrote to Flora Whitney Miller stating that she brought her mother with her from Rapallo to New York in 1939. While it is true that occasionally a secondary source had provided Miller with information which later proved factually erroneous, the "contemporary primary source material" of Sage's 1939 letter to Flora Whitney Miller stating that she had brought her mother with her at that time to NYC is indisputable, and is contrary to what Suther wrote in her book without providing a source.
- Tessier, Régine. "Sage, Kay Linn," in Barbara Sicherman and Carol Hurd Green, eds., Notable American Women: The Modern Period. Cambridge, Mass.: The Belknap Press of Harvard University Press, 1980, pp. 618–619.
- von Maur, Karin, ed. Yves Tanguy and Surrealism. Ostfildern-Ruit, Germany: Hatje Cantz, 2001.
