= William Baziotes =

American painter (1912–1963)

- William Baziotes, ca. 1947, Francis Lee, photographer. William and Ethel Baziotes papers, Archives of American Art, Smithsonian Institution.
- Born: June 11, 1912; Pittsburgh, Pennsylvania, US
- Died: June 6, 1963 (aged 50); New York City, US
- Education: National Academy of Design
- Known for: Painting
- Movement: Abstract expressionism

William Baziotes (June 11, 1912 – June 6, 1963) was an American painter influenced by Surrealism and was a contributor to Abstract Expressionism.

== Early life and education ==
Cyclops, 1947 Oil on canvas, shown at the Art Institute of Chicago

Born in Pittsburgh, Pennsylvania to Greek parents Angelos and Stella, Baziotes was raised in Reading, Pennsylvania and began his formal art training in 1933 at the National Academy of Design in New York City where he graduated in 1936. He studied with Charles Curran, Ivan Olinsky, Gifford Beal, and Leon Kroll.

== Career ==
From 1936 to 1968, Baziotes served as a teacher for the Federal Art Project. He also worked on the WPA Easel Project between 1938 and 1940.

In the 1940s, Baziotes developed relationships with artists associated with the emerging Abstract Expressionist group. While he shared the groups' interest in primitive art and automatism, his work was more in line with European surrealism. His first solo exhibition was at Peggy Guggenheim's Art of This Century Gallery in 1944.

Baziotes remained a teacher for the subsequent years. In 1948, he, alongside Mark Rothko, Robert Motherwell, Barnett Newman and David Hare, founded the Subjects of the Artist School at 35 East 8th Street. Lectures there were open to the public, with speakers such as Jean Arp, John Cage and Ad Reinhardt, but the art school failed financially and closed in the spring of 1949. He later taught at the Brooklyn Museum Art School, People's Art Center, the Museum of Modern Art, and at the City University of New York, Hunter College and New York University in Manhattan during the last ten years of his life.

Some of Baziotes' famous works are Aquatic, Dusk, and The Room, all of which are in the Guggenheim Museum in New York.

=== Notable awards ===
- Art Institute of Chicago

=== Notable exhibitions ===
- Retrospective, Solomon R. Guggenheim Museum, New York, 1965, curator and essay by Lawrence Alloway.
- Subjects of the Artist, Whitney Museum of American Art, downtown branch, Spring 1975, organized by Barbara Cavaliere, Robert Carlton Hobbs, et. al.
- Early Abstract Expressionism: The Formative Years, Whitney Museum of American Art, New York, 1977, "William Baziotes," essay by Barbara Cavaliere.
- Retrospective, Newport Harbor Museum; 1987, catalogue essays by Barbara Cavaliere and Mona Hadler.

=== Notable collections ===
- Guggenheim Museum
- Metropolitan Museum of Art
- Museum of Modern Art
- Smithsonian American Art Museum
- Whitney Museum of American Art
- Reading Public Museum

== Personal life ==
Baziotes and his wife Ethel, whom he married in 1941, lived in the Morningside Heights area of northern Manhattan until his death from lung cancer in June 1963, five days before his 51st birthday. During his lifetime, he and his wife shared a love of ancient Greek art and sculpture as well as the poetry of Charles Baudelaire. Many of his paintings are inspired by the latter's poetry as well as by ancient art.
