= Abstract Imagists =

Abstract Imagists is a term derived from a 1961 exhibition in the Guggenheim Museum, New York called American Abstract Expressionists and Imagists. This exhibition was the first in the series of programs for the investigation of tendencies in American and European painting and sculpture.

== Style ==
It had been recognized that the paintings of Josef Albers, Barnett Newman, Mark Rothko, Adolph Gottlieb, Ad Reinhardt, Clyfford Still and Robert Motherwell were all very different yet the symbolic content was achieved "through dramatic statement of isolated and highly simplified elements." In many cases the dramatic simplification was achieved by the use of:

- geometric means: Josef Albers; Franz Kline; Hans Hofmann
- compression: Grace Hartigan; George McNeil
- intricate elaboration of canvas surfaces: Richard Pousette-Dart; Robert Richenburg; John Ferren; Jimmy Ernst;
- isolated shapes or signs: Adolph Gottlieb, Robert Motherwell
- detailed over-all patterning of the canvas: William Baziotes
- simplified structure through the dominance of the large, unified color shapes: James Brooks, Esteban Vicente, Adja Yunkers, Cameron Booth; Giorgio Cavallon

In some cases there was a "loss of the feeling and immediacy" in the work.

== List of Abstract Imagists ==
- Josef Albers
- William Baziotes
- Norman Bluhm
- Cameron Booth
- James Brooks
- Lawrence Calcagno
- Nicolas Carone
- Giorgio Cavallon
- Nassos Daphnis
- Enrico Donati
- Edward Dugmore
- Friedel Dzubas
- Jimmy Ernst
- John Ferren
- Sam Francis
- Helen Frankenthaler
- Michael Goldberg
- Arshile Gorky
- Adolph Gottlieb
- Cleve Gray
- Stephen Greene
- John Grillo
- Philip Guston
- Grace Hartigan
- Al Held
- Hans Hofmann
- Ralph Humphrey
- Paul Jenkins
- Alfred Jensen
- Jasper Johns
- Ellsworth Kelly
- Franz Kline
- Willem de Kooning
- Alfred Leslie
- Michael Loew
- Morris Louis
- Conrad Marca-Relli
- Roberto Matta
- George McNeil
- Joan Mitchell
- Kyle Morris
- Robert Motherwell
- Barnett Newman
- Kenneth Noland
- Raymond Parker
- Jackson Pollock
- Richard Pousette-Dart
- Robert Rauschenberg
- Ad Reinhardt
- Milton Resnick
- Robert Richenburg
- William Ronald
- Mark Rothko
- Ludwig Sander
- Leon Smith
- Theodoros Stamos
- Frank Stella
- Clyfford Still
- Mark Tobey
- Bradley Walker Tomlin
- Jack Tworkov
- Albert Urban
- Esteban Vicente
- Jack Youngerman
- Adja Yunkers

== Some other Abstract Imagists ==
- Perle Fine (1908–1988)
- Ilse Getz (1917–1992)
- Rollin Crampton (1896–1970)
- Robert Goodnough (1917–2010)
- David Hare (1917–1992)
- Buffie Johnson (1912–2006)
- William King (1925-)
- Gabriel Kohn (1910–1975)
- George Ortman (1926–2015)
- James Rosati, (1911–1988)

== See also ==
- New York Figurative Expressionism
- American Figurative Expressionism
- Expressionism
- Abstract Expressionism
- New York School

Related styles, trends, schools or movements

- Action painting
- Abstract expressionism
- New York School
- Color field painting
- Hard-edge painting
- Minimalism
- All-over painting
- Pattern and Decoration

== Sources ==
- Virgil Baker, From realism to reality in recent American painting. (Lincoln : University of Nebraska Press, 1959.)
- Bernard H. Friedman, School of New York: some younger artists. (New York, Grove Press [©1959])
- Sam Hunter, Modern American Painting and Sculpture. ([New York, Dell Pub. Co., 1959])
- Harold Rosenberg, The Tradition of the New. (New York, Horizon Press, 1959)
- György Kepes, The Visual Arts Today. (Middletown, Conn., Wesleyan University Press [1960])
