= Ashby =

Ashby may refer to:

== People ==
- Ashby (surname)
- Alan la Zouche, 1st Baron la Zouche of Ashby (1267–1314), governor of Rockingham Castle and steward of Rockingham Forest, England
- Walter Ashby Plecker (1861–1947), American physician and public health advocate
- Henry Ashby Turner (1932—2008), American historian of Germany
- Ashby Pate (born 1978), American lawyer

== Places ==
=== Australia ===
- Ashby, Victoria
- Ashby, Western Australia

=== United Kingdom ===
- Ashby, Lincolnshire
- Ashby, Suffolk
- Ashby with Oby, Norfolk
- Ashby by Partney, Lincolnshire
- Ashby cum Fenby, Lincolnshire
- Ashby de la Launde, Lincolnshire
- Ashby-de-la-Zouch, Leicestershire
- Ashby Folville, Leicestershire
- Ashby Magna, Leicestershire
- Ashby Parva, Leicestershire
- Ashby Puerorum, Lincolnshire
- Ashby St Ledgers, Northamptonshire
- Ashby St Mary, Norfolk
- Canons Ashby, Northamptonshire
- Castle Ashby, Northamptonshire
- Cold Ashby, Northamptonshire
- Mears Ashby, Northamptonshire
- West Ashby, Lincolnshire

=== United States ===
- Ashby, Massachusetts
- Ashby, Minnesota
- Ashby, Nebraska
- Ashby, Warren County, Virginia

== Buildings ==
- Ashby (BART station), a passenger rail station in Berkeley, California
- Ashby (MARTA station), a passenger rail station in Atlanta, Georgia
- Ashby Manor Historic District, listed on the National Register of Historic Places in Iowa
- Ashby (Ladoga, Indiana), listed on the National Register of Historic Places in Indiana

== Other uses ==
- Ashby, a novel by Pierre Guyotat
- Material selection#Ashby plots, a diagram with chemical elements
- Ashby (film), a 2015 drama film starring Mickey Rourke
- Ashby (automobile), an English cyclecar manufactured 1919–1924

== See also ==
- Ashbee, surname
