= Don Ray =

Don or Donald Ray may refer to:

- Raymond Donnez or Don Ray (1942–2019), disco producer, arranger and performer
- Don Ray (basketball) (1921–1998), basketball player
- Don B. Ray (1925–2005), American television composer
- Donray (Donald Arvin Ray), American artist
- Donald Ray (cricketer), English cricketer and British Army officer
