= Ethel Fisher =

American painter

- Ethel Fisher, Miami studio, 1956
- Born: Ethel Blankfield; 1923; Galveston, Texas, United States
- Died: 2017 (aged 94); Pacific Palisades, California, U.S.
- Education: Art Students League of New York; University of Houston; University of Texas; Washington University
- Known for: Painting, drawing
- Style: Figurative, representational
- Spouses: Gene Fisher (m. 1943; div. 1961) Seymour Kott (m. 1962; died 2012)
- Children: Sandra Fisher (1947–1994); Margaret Fisher (born 1948)
- Awards: Louis Comfort Tiffany Foundation
- Website: Ethel Fisher

Ethel Fisher (née Blankfield; 1923–2017) was an American painter whose career spanned more than seven decades in New York City, Miami and Los Angeles. Her work ranges across abstraction and representational genres including large-scale portraiture, architectural "portraits," landscape and still-life, and is unified by a sustained formal emphasis on color and space. After studying at the Art Students League in the 1940s, Fisher gained recognition as an abstract artist in Florida in the late 1950s, and began exhibiting nationally and in Havana, Cuba. Her formative work of this period embraced the history of art, architecture and anthropology; she referred to it as "abstract impressionist" to distinguish her approach to form and color from that of Abstract Expressionism.

Ethel Fisher, Fine Arts Building, Chicago (410 S. Michigan Avenue), oil on canvas, 66" x 47", 1976.

Fisher is best known for portraits of fellow artists from the 1960s and grid-like, architectural paintings of the facades of urban cast-iron buildings from the 1970s. Her figurative work employs color fields and architectural details as abstract shapes to create tension between her subjects and their surroundings and impart psychological depth. Her later, carefully rendered interiors and still lifes often include reproductions of works by well-known artists.

Fisher's work was written about in The New York Times, Los Angeles Times, ARTnews and Artweek, and belongs to the public collections of the Los Angeles County Museum of Art (LACMA), Museum of Contemporary Art San Diego, Dallas Museum of Art, and Crocker Art Museum, among others. She died in Pacific Palisades, Los Angeles in 2017, at age 94.

== Personal life and education ==
Ethel Blankfield was born in 1923 in Galveston, Texas to Sam and Ada (Zax) Blankfield. She studied art from 1939 to 1943 at the University of Houston, University of Texas and Washington University in St. Louis, under Howard Cook, William McVey and B.J.O. Nordfeldt, among others. While teaching art to servicemen in San Antonio during World War II, she met Gene Fisher, whom she married in St. Louis in 1943.

Later that year, the couple moved to New York City, where Fisher attended the Art Students League on scholarship, with classmates including Ilse Getz, Edith Schloss and Henry C. Pearson. She studied there with Morris Kantor and New York School painter Will Barnet, who became a lifelong friend. In 1947, Fisher gave birth to her first daughter, Sandra, in New York. Sandra Fisher would emigrate to London, where she was included in the first School of London show, "The Human Clay," and married the painter R. B. Kitaj in 1983. The Fishers moved to Miami in 1948, where Ethel installed a studio in the family home and a second daughter, Margaret, was born; Margaret Fisher is a performance and media artist and writer, married to composer and new music conductor Robert Hughes.

In 1961, Ethel Fisher left Miami and her family to concentrate on her painting. After travelling in Europe for a year, she resettled in Manhattan with her second husband, art historian Seymour Kott. She rented a studio with Ilse Getz in a loft building at 30 East 14th Street overlooking Union Square; the building was occupied at various times by artists Virginia Admiral, Carl Ashby, Robert De Niro Sr., Edwin Dickinson and Harry Sternberg. Here, Fisher turned her attention back to figurative work, countering contemporary movements such as Abstract Expressionism and Pop, which dominated the New York art scene.

At the end of the decade, Fisher and Kott left New York and rented a property in the Hollywood Hills next door to the home of Sharon Tate and Roman Polanski just weeks before the Manson murders took place. Their account of that night was published in several books about the murders. In 1971, they bought a 1926, multi-level Spanish Colonial home on a slope above the Pacific Ocean in Pacific Palisades; its architecture and ocean and mountain views appear in many of Fisher's paintings. The Los Angeles Times Home magazine featured the house and Fisher's decorating and paintings in a 1974 spread. She continued to work in her studio until her death in 2017, after which the house was bequeathed to the Metropolitan Museum of Art.

== Art career ==
Fisher exhibited widely while based in Miami. She had solo shows at the Lowe and Mirell galleries (1954) and Norton Museum of Art (1958) in Florida, the National Museum of Fine Arts of Havana (1957), the Riverside Museum (1958) and Angeleski Gallery (1960) in New York, and Edward Dean Gallery (1961, San Francisco). She contributed to group shows at The Lyceum (Havana), the Museum of Modern Art, Ringling Museum of Art, Art U.S.A., and nationally touring shows from the Florida Artist Group and Ford Foundation / de Young Museum ("Cubism Now and Expressionism in the West," 1961). While Fisher found many exhibition opportunities, she was not taken on by a New York gallery, a circumstance she attributed to a professional climate that often rejected women artists.

Ethel Fisher, Garden Gift, oil on canvas, 32" x 32", 1958. Crocker Art Museum collection.

After moving to New York City in 1962, Fisher returned to figurative work and began working with collage on paper. She participated in New York group shows at the Castagno, A.M. Sachs and Capricorn ("Artists by Artists" show) galleries, and Los Angeles shows at the Eugenia Butler and Margo Leavin galleries and LACMA ("The Contained Object," 1967).

Following her move to the West Coast in 1969, Fisher began the body of work for which she is best known, the building paintings, which previewed in a group show at Los Angeles Institute of Contemporary Art ("Current Concerns," 1975, curated by Walter Hopps) and received a solo showing the same year at the Mitzi Landau Gallery. By the end of the decade, Fisher was again painting the figure and showing her work in "California Figurative Painters" (1977, Tortue Gallery), which included Elmer Bischoff, Joan Brown, Richard Diebenkorn and David Park, and "Portraits/1979" at the Los Angeles Municipal Art Gallery. Later exhibitions include a solo show at Michael Ivey Gallery (1986) and the group shows "Portraits" (American Jewish University, 2003) and "Revealing and Concealing: Portraits and Identity" (Skirball Cultural Center, 2000), which included works by Eleanor Antin, Kitaj, and Warhol.

Fisher was featured, along with Larry Bell, Robert Irwin, Betye Saar and others, in "Video Interviews of 27 California Artists" (1976), produced for Ronald Feldman Fine Arts in New York. Her drawing 476 Broome Street was reproduced in the book Expressive Drawing (1989), and her painting Santa Monica Bay was chosen for the cover of Hometown Santa Monica (2007). Her work belongs to the public art collections of LACMA, the Crocker Art Museum, Norton Museum of Art, Lowe Gallery (University of Miami), Peabody College, and University of California at Los Angeles. Fisher's papers are in the collections of the Smithsonian Archives of American Art in New York and the National Museum of Women in the Arts in Washington, DC.

== Work and reception ==
Fisher began her professional career as an early-modernist-influenced abstract artist, before turning to portraiture in the 1960s, architectural paintings in the 1970, and landscapes and still lifes in her late career. In the 1950s, she painted in a lyrical style that features impressionistic elements and organic shapes and planes that reference architecture (e.g., Garden Gift, Oriental #2, or The City) and pre-Columbian, Byzantine and Japanese art. Havana critic Adele Jaume characterizes Fisher's paintings as achieving "mastery in the disposition of planes and in the employment of color"; a 1960 New York Times review compares their entwining, suggestive shapes to the work of Arshile Gorky.

=== Portraits ===
Ethel Fisher, Two Figures (Profile)/Orange Space, oil on canvas, 60" x 40", 1968. Los Angeles County Museum of Art collection.

In the early 1960s, after studying Classical Greek sculpture and Pompeian frescoes in Europe, Fisher decided that she had reached an impasse with the era's dominant abstract mode. Like others, such as Jane Freilicher, Alex Katz, Philip Pearlstein and the Bay Area Figurative Movement, she turned to the figure, eventually choosing a humanistic approach rather than Pop Art's flat, distanced style. She took evening lectures at the Art Students League with the well-known anatomy instructor, Robert Beverly Hale, and produced large works of simple, generalized figures with rounded Matisse-like bodies, depicted with loose brushwork, gestural line and strong color. Two paintings marking this transition from abstraction, Two Sisters (1964) and Woman on a Bed (1965), were recognized with a Louis Comfort Tiffany Foundation Award for Painting in 1965.

Fisher's late-1960s work sought greater representational specificity and psychological depth in portraits of herself, family and artist friends, such as Henry Pearson and Paul Thek. She composed her figures against large color fields, as in Portrait of Will Barnet (1967), which she considered a breakthrough figurative work. Related portraits in this vein include Alice Baber and Paul Jenkins (1967) and two depicting herself and Seymour Kott: Two Figures/Orange Space (1968) and Double Portrait/Yellow Space (New York) (1969); their background color fields, clothing, and stylized outlines containing anatomical details recall the work of Richard Lindner.

In the late 1970s, after a break from portraits, Fisher resumed figurative work, conveying psychological overtones through details of clothing and interior spaces (e.g., Two Women, 1978; Portrait of Ilse Getz, 1979). By that time, Los Angeles Times critic William Wilson could write of a portraiture "revival"; his review of the "Portraits 79" exhibition describes Fisher's work as bringing "spare simplification to women of an aesthetic-intellectual type resting in small apartments … haunted by past pain."

In the 1980s and 1990s, Fisher continued to paint portraits of herself, her family and art-world friends, such as Martha Alf, Lem Dobbs, Michael Wingo, Leona Wood, and costume designer Ruth Morley. This work increasingly incorporated classical architectural forms (e.g., Model Holding Mirror, 1982; Reading in the Loggia, 1996) that functioned as both color fields and backgrounds.

=== Architectural paintings ===
In the early 1970s, Fisher felt that her portraits were moving toward a formula. She spent the next seven years producing a body of architectural paintings and graphite drawings that embraced discipline and a restrictive palette. She was influenced by the work of Magritte and the late-19th-century cast-iron buildings of her youth in Galveston, with their Art Nouveau and Classical motifs. She eventually focused on monumental works that carefully record iconic, frontal views of ornate facades (usually four to six floors), sourced from black-and-white photographs of buildings in New York, Chicago, Galveston and St. Louis.

Rather than create photorealist street-scene renderings, however, she modified her subjects with invented and remembered colors and expressive, loose brushwork, seeking to create personal interpretations and building "portraits." Critics compare the tight, shallow spaces and grid-like organization to Mondrian canvasses and Louise Nevelson constructions, and the use of diagonal shafts of light (e.g., Fine Arts Building, Chicago, 1976) to the Cubist and Impressionist dissolution of hard-edged space.

Ethel Fisher, California Landscape II/with fire in distance, oil on canvas, 48" x 72", 1985.

Fisher appeared in the show, "Painting, Color, Form and Surface" (1974, curated by Martha Alf), along with Diebenkorn, Sam Francis and Ed Moses, all of whom were creating work that explored "painting as pure form" in contrast to the era's conceptual and fabricated art. Alf writes that Fisher's facade image, Building—Broadway—South of Houston Street (1974), is both completely recognizable and abstract, with shallow space, geometric form, subtle color and shadows that "reflect and conceal the mystery in the big city." Her review of Fisher's 1975 solo exhibition describes the combined effect of differing light conditions, angles and disembodied patterns across works as a surrealistic, imaginary urban street of mysterious quiet.

=== Landscapes and still lifes ===
From the 1980s onward, Fisher turned increasingly to the California vistas surrounding her home (e.g., California Landscape II/with fire in distance, 1985), sometimes in combination with portraits (e.g., Santa Monica Beach (Sandra, Alix, Max), 1989), buildings, or still lifes. In these works, she often moved between horizontal and strongly vertical compositions that reflect her architectural interests (e.g., Garden Walls/Los Angeles, 1994 and Hill Above Patio, 1997–8).

Fisher turned to still lifes in her later career. Using the strong simple forms of David's painting The Death of Marat as a springboard, many of these works feature arrangements of objects stabilized by a central wooden box and seek a "mood between menace and melancholy." She began to stack her objects vertically—which is unorthodox for still lifes—and included miniature artwork reproductions as postcards within the arrangements, recalling the ubiquitous postcard collections of many artists.
