= Ashby (surname) =

Ashby is an English surname. Notable people with the surname include:

- Aaron Ashby (born 1998), American baseball player
- Alan Ashby (born 1951), American baseball player
- Alexander Essebiensis (Alexander of Ashby) (c. 1220), English theologian and poet
- Alison Marjorie Ashby (1901–1987), Australian botanical artist and plant collector
- Andy Ashby (born 1967), American baseball player
- Carl Ashby (1914–2004), American artist
- Christopher C. Ashby (born 1946), American ambassador to Uruguay, 1997–2001
- David Ashby (born 1940), British Conservative Member of Parliament 1983–1997
- David Ashby (cricketer) (1852–1934), New Zealand cricketer
- Debee Ashby (born 1967), British adult model
- Dorothy Ashby (1932–1986), American jazz harpist and composer
- Earl Ashby (born 1921), Cuban baseball player
- Edwin Ashby (1861–1941), Australian malacologist and ornithologist
- Eric Ashby, Baron Ashby (1904–1992), British botanist and educator
- Gary Ashby (born 1955), American baseball coach
- George Ashby (martyr) (died 1537), martyred English monk
- Godfrey Ashby (1930–2023), British Anglican bishop
- Hal Ashby (1929–1988), American film director
- Harry Ashby (golfer) (1946–2010), English golfer
- Irving Ashby (1920–1987), American jazz guitarist
- Jeffrey Ashby (born 1954), American naval aviator and astronaut
- John Ashby (militiaman) (18th century), colonel in the Virginia Militia
- John Ashby (Royal Navy officer) (1646–1693), English admiral during the War of the League of Augsburg
- Joseph Ashby-Sterry (c. 1837–1917), English poet and novelist
- Julian Ashby (born 2002), American football player
- Linden Ashby (born 1960), American actor
- Madeline Ashby (born 1983), American-Canadian science fiction writer
- Margery Corbett Ashby (1882–1981), British feminist and internationalist
- Michael Ashby (1914–2004), British neurologist
- Michael F. Ashby (born 1935), British metallurgist
- Peter Ashby, British musician and composer
- Ray Ashby, British rugby player
- Richard Ashby (born 1972), British poker player
- Sydney Francis Ashby (1874–1954), British mycologist and phytopathologist
- Sylvia Rose Ashby (1908–1978), British-born Australian market researcher
- Thomas Ashby (disambiguation)
- Turner Ashby (1828–1862), Confederate cavalry general in the American Civil War
- William Ross Ashby (1903–1972), English psychiatrist and founder of the English school of cybernetics
