= Cora Canne Meijer =

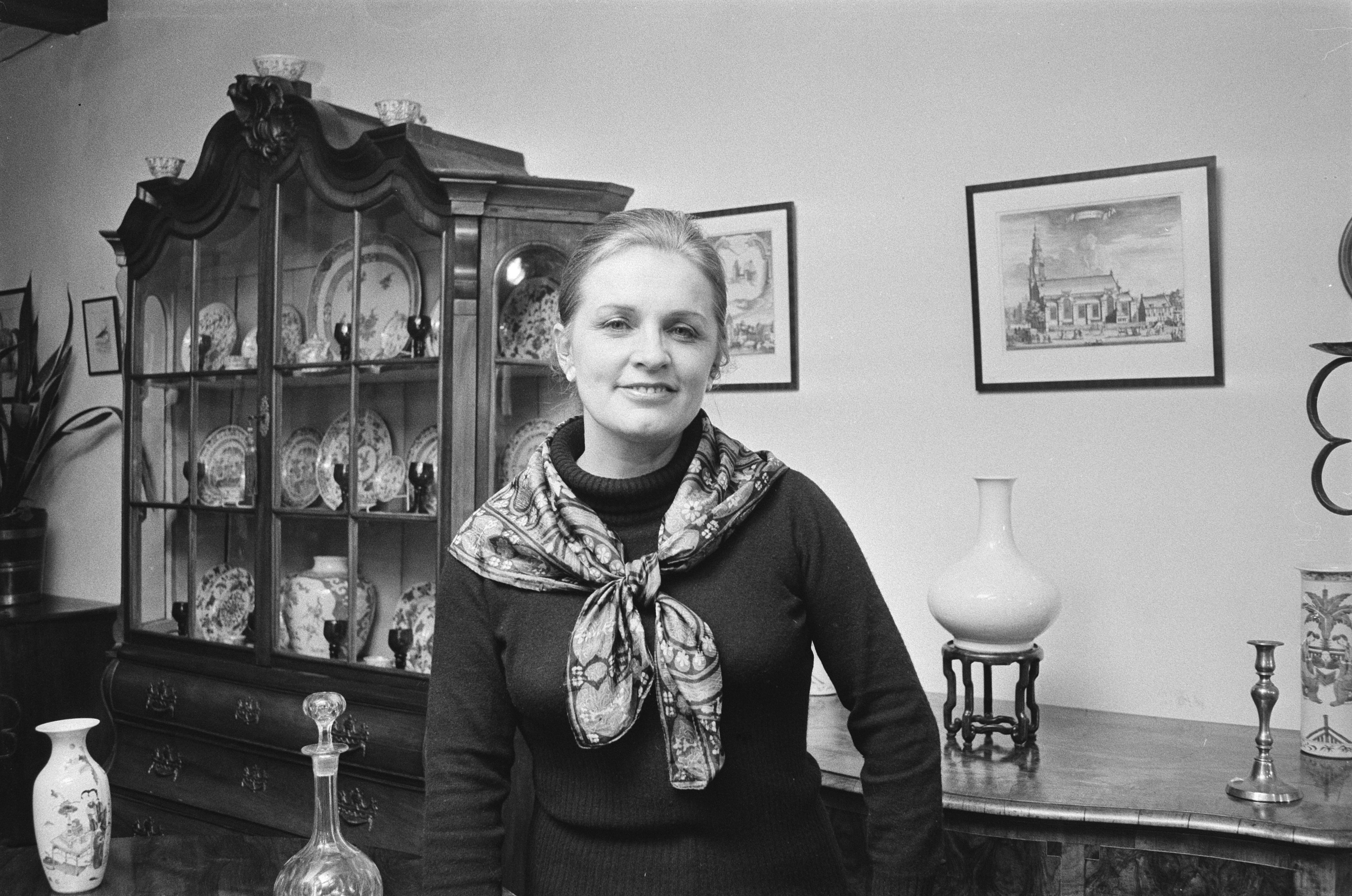
- Born: 11 August 1929; Amsterdam, Netherlands
- Died: 25 August 2020 (aged 91); Laren, North Holland, Netherlands
- Education: Conservatorium van Amsterdam
- Occupations: Mezzo-soprano; Voice teacher
- Years active: 1950–1999
- Spouse: Gerhard Patriasz
- Children: 1
- Awards: Knight of the Order of Orange-Nassau

Cora Canne Meijer (11 August 1929 – 25 August 2020) was a Dutch mezzo-soprano and voice teacher. She studied singing at the Conservatorium van Amsterdam and then in Paris and Vienna. Canne Meijer made her stage debut in the minor role of Annina in Giuseppe Verdi's La traviata with the Dutch National Opera in Amsterdam in 1950. She sang a series of major roles during her career and was a member of the ensemble of the Zurich Opera House on a two-year contract from 1960 until 1962. Canne Meijer's final stage performance was in 1999. She was appointed Knight of the Order of Orange-Nassau in 1973.

== Early life ==
Canne Meijer was born in Amsterdam, Netherlands on 11 August 1929. Her father, Johan Canne Meijer, was a car parts representative, and her mother worked an office job. Canne Meijer had an elder brother, who was killed in an Allied bombing during the Second World War. She wanted to become an actress and began stage acting at age six. However, Canne Meijer listened to a record of Schubert songs in her youth, opting instead for a singing career. Soon after the end of the Second World War, she studied singing under Jan Keizer and Ré Koster at the Conservatorium van Amsterdam. Canne Meijer furthered her vocal training under Noémie Pérugia in Paris and under Alfred Jerger in Vienna.

== Career ==
In September 1950, she made her stage debut in the minor role of Annina in Giuseppe Verdi's La traviata with the Dutch National Opera in Amsterdam. In her first year with the company, Canne Meijer sang a series of major roles that included Prinz Orlofsky in Johann Strauss II's’ Die Fledermaus, Cherubino in Wolfgang Amadeus Mozart’s The Marriage of Figaro, Rosina in Gioachino Rossini’s The Barber of Seville, and the title role in Ambroise Thomas’s Mignon. She made her international debut was at the Glyndebourne Festival Opera as Cherubino in Mozart's The Marriage of Figaro in mid-1956. In 1958, Canne Meijer sang at the Holland Festival in The Hague (Koninklijke Schouwburg) in the world premiere of Sem Dresden's opera Le Testament de Villon. She appeared at Salzburg in Joseph Haydn’s Il mondo della luna, and as Prince Orlofsky at the Opéra de Monte-Carlo.

Canne Meijer was a member of the ensemble of the Zurich Opera House on a two-year contract from 1960 until 1962. She sang in Geneva in the premieres of Frank Martin's Monsieur de Pourceaugnac in April 1963 and Darius Milhaud's La Mère coupable in June 1966. In 1968, Canne Meijer appeared in the French premiere of Richard Rodney Bennett’s The Mines of Sulphur at the Opéra de Marseille. Two years later, she sung the title role of Louis Sauger’s Maria Pineda at its première at Marseille in 1970. Canne Meijer returned to Amsterdam to sing the title role of Carmen in 1971 at the invitation of artistic director Hans de Roo. She sang Isolier in the Glyndebourne Opera recording of Gioachino Rossini's Le comte Ory, as well as Charlotte in Jules Massenet’s Werther, Azucena in Verdi’s Il trovatore, and Der Komponist in Richard Strauss’s Ariadne auf Naxos.

During the 1980s, Canne Meijer was a member of the Dutch quartet of singers consisting of Cristina Deutekom, Adriaan van Limpt and Jan Derksen, who performed Verdi's Il trovatore. In October 1982 she sang in Bizet's opera Carmen opposite Marco Bakker as Escamilo and Roberta Alexander as Micaela. Canne Meijer's final Dutch National Opera performance was as Bianca in Benjamin Britten's The Rape of Lucretia in November 1986, following the move of the company to Waterlooplein from Leidseplein. Following her retirement from the stage, she worked as a vocal teacher at the Sweelinck Conservatory in Amsterdam. In March 1996, she played the part of the blind Madelon in the Umberto Giordano opera Andrea Chénier at The Matinee on the Free Saturday. Canne Meijer's final stage performance was as Zita in Giacomo Puccini's Gianni Schicchi at Vredenburg in 1999.

A CD box set entitled The Art Of Cora Canne Meijer In Opera of live performances and radio broadcasts of her from 1956 to 1981 was released by Gala. She was a jury member of international vocal competitions.

== Personal life ==
She was married to the horn player Gerhard Patriasz. There was one son of the marriage and Canne Meijer was stepmother to Patriasz's daughter from a previous marriage. She died at the Rosa Spier Huis in Laren on 25 August 2020. Canne Meijer's cremation was held in private.

== Recognition ==
She was appointed Knight of the Order of Orange-Nassau in 1973.
