= Marc Laho =

Belgian lyric tenor opera singer (born 1965)

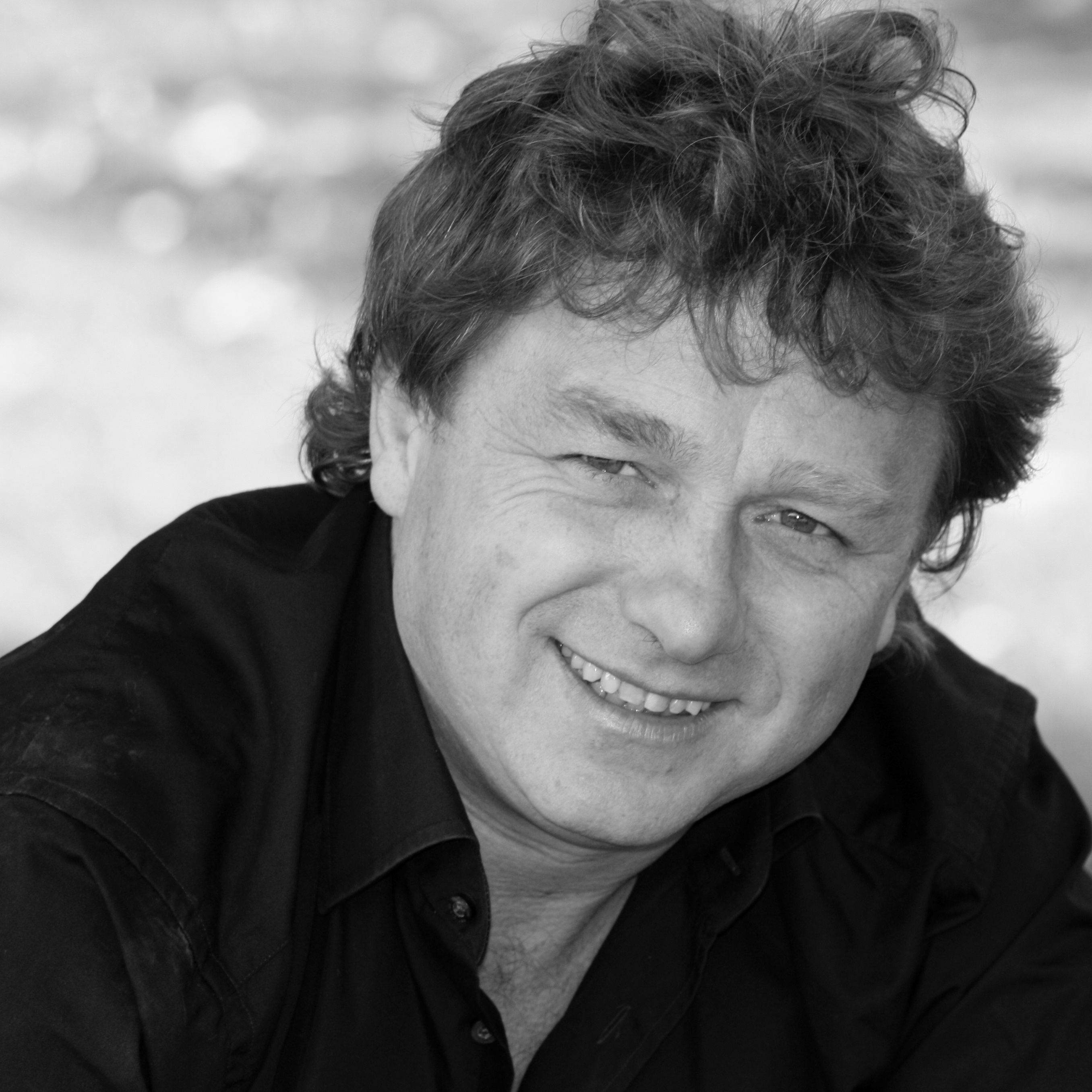
- Marc Laho, Lausanne, December 2007
- Born: January 15, 1965 (age 61); Seraing, Belgium
- Occupation: Opera singer (tenor)

Marc Laho (born 15 January 1965) is a Belgian lyric tenor opera singer.

== Biography ==
Laho was born in Seraing, Belgium. He studied at the Royal Conservatory of Liège in Belgium and later with Luigi Alva, Alain Vanzo, and Gabriel Bacquier. He made his professional opera debut at the Opéra de Monte-Carlo in 1989 as l'officier in Massenet's Thérèse. In 1992, he participated in the final round of the Pavarotti's international singing competition in Philadelphia.

He sang Gérald in Lakmé co-starring Natalie Dessay in Avignon, Pâris in Offenbach's La Belle Hélène conducted by Nikolaus Harnoncourt in Zurich, and Elvino in La Sonnambula at the Opéra-Comique and the Vienna State Opera. He performed his first Hoffmann in 2008 at the Grand Théâtre de Genève directed by Olivier Py, then confirmed his interpretation, directed by Nicolas Joel, at the Teatro Regio in Turin. He appeared in the Requiem by Berlioz at the Festival de Saint-Denis conducted by Sir Colin Davis, as well as in Lélio by Berlioz at the Théâtre des Champs-Élysées conducted by Riccardo Muti.

Recently he appeared in The Tales of Hoffmann in Prague, L'attaque du moulin in Bern, Die Fledermaus in Montpellier, La Rondine in Toulon, La Sonnambula in Bonn and Le Duc d'Albe in Antwerp and Ghent.

In September 2012 he could be heard singing the title role in Stradella by César Franck, a world premiere for the reopening of the Royal Opera of Wallonia in Liège. Marc Laho appeared as Fernand in Donizetti's La favorite at the Théâtre des Champs-Élysées in February 2013. In 2018 he appeared as Don José in a video-recorded performance of Bizet's Carmen by the Opéra Royal de Liège.

== Roles ==
- Daniel Auber
  - Gustave III ou le Bal masqué – Gustave III
- Vincenzo Bellini
  - I puritani – Lord Arturo Talbo
  - La sonnambula – Elvino
- Georges Bizet
  - Carmen – Don José
  - Les Pêcheurs de perles – Nadir
- François-Adrien Boieldieu
  - La Dame blanche – Georges
- Gustave Charpentier
  - Louise – King of the Fools
- Ernest Chausson
  - Le Roi Arthus – Lyonnel
- Léo Delibes
  - Lakmé – Gérald
- Gaetano Donizetti
  - Alahor in Granata – Alamar
  - Don Pasquale – Ernesto
  - La favorite – Fernand
  - La fille du régiment – Tonio
  - Le Duc d’Albe – Henri de Bruges
  - Lucia di Lammermoor – Lord Arturo Bucklaw
  - Lucia di Lammermoor – Sir Edgardo di Ravenswood
  - Maria Stuarda – Leicester
- Gabriel Fauré
  - Pénélope – Antinoüs
- César Franck
  - Stradella – Stradella
- Charles Gounod
  - Mireille – Vincent
- Jacques-Fromental Halévy
  - La Juive – Prince Léopold
- Franz Lehár
  - The Merry Widow – Camille de Rosillon
- Jules Massenet
  - Manon – Le Chevalier des Grieux
  - Thaïs – Nicias
- Jacques Offenbach
  - La belle Hélène – Pâris
  - La Périchole – Piquillo
  - The Tales of Hoffmann – Hoffmann
  - Orpheus in the Underworld – Orpheus
- Giacomo Puccini
  - La rondine – Ruggero Lastouc
- Gioachino Rossini
  - Le comte Ory – Le Comte Ory
  - Le siège de Corinthe – Néoclès
- Nino Rota
  - Il cappello di paglia di Firenze – Fadinard
- Johann Strauss II
  - Die Fledermaus – Alfred
- Ambroise Thomas
  - Hamlet – Laërte
- Giuseppe Verdi
  - I Lombardi alla prima crociata – Arvino
  - La traviata – Alfredo Germont

and many other

== Recordings ==
- Les Contes d’Hoffmann, Offenbach, Conductor: Patrick Davin, Staging: Olivier Py, Grand Théâtre de Genève, DVD: Bel Air Media, 2008
- Lucie de Lammermoor, Donizetti, Conductor: Evelino Pidò, Opéra National de Lyon, CD: EMI 2002, DVD: Bel Air Media 2002
- Le comte Ory, Rossini, Conductor: Andrew Davis, Staging: Jérôme Savary, Glyndebourne Festival, DVD: NVC Arts (Warner), 1997
- Symphonie No. 3, Ropartz, Conductor: Jean-Yves Ossonce, CD: Timpani, 2011
- Comala/Clair de lune, Jongen, Conductor: Jean-Pierre Haeck, CD: Musique en Wallonie, 2003
- Freyhir, Mathieu, Conductor: Jean-Pierre Haeck, CD: Musique en Wallonie, 2007
