= Le comte Ory =

1828 opera by Gioachino Rossini

- Opera by Gioachino Rossini
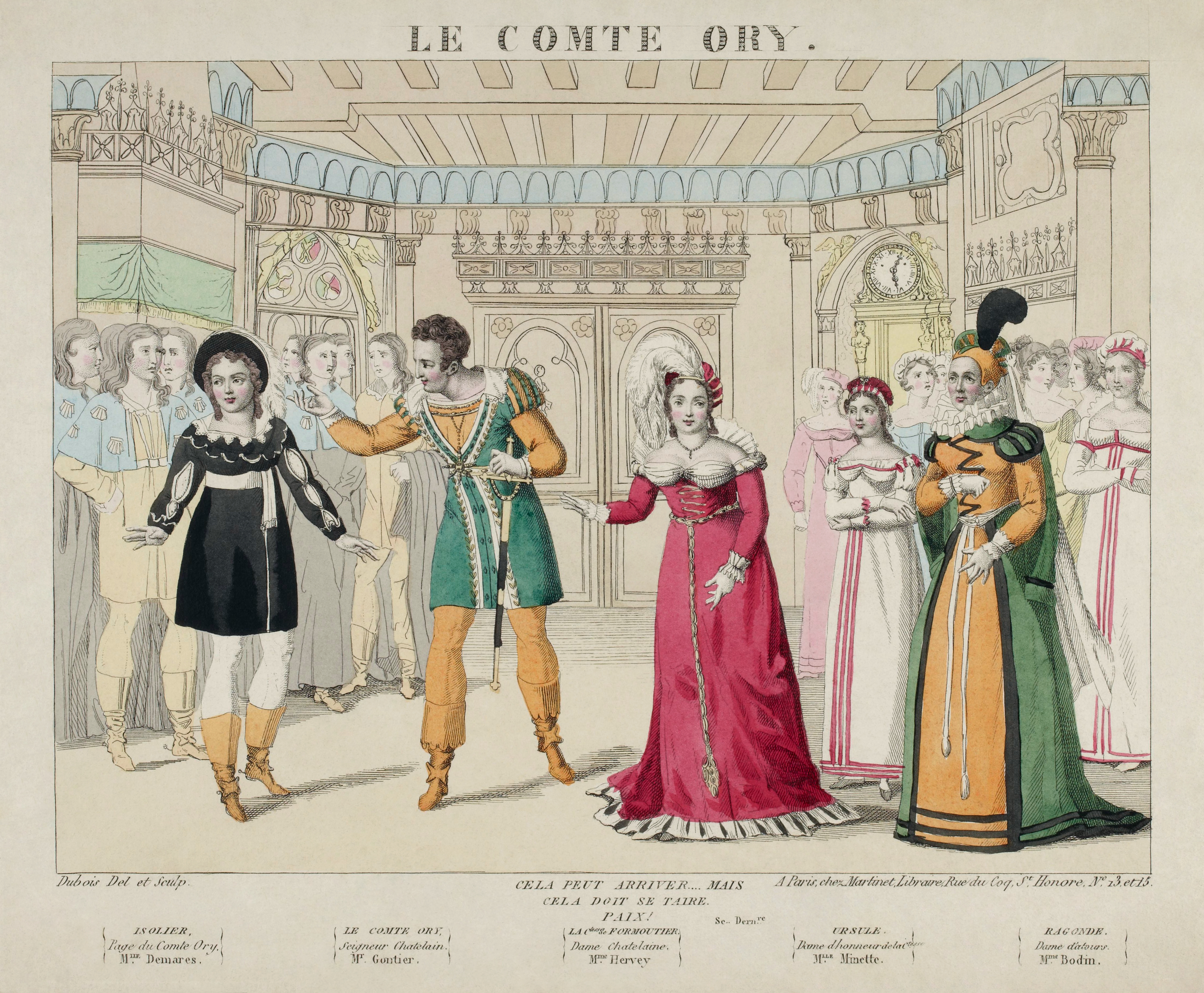
- Final scene, in 1828
- Librettist: Eugène Scribe; Charles-Gaspard Delestre-Poirson
- Language: French
- Premiere: 20 August 1828; Salle Le Peletier, Paris

Le comte Ory (Count Ory) is a comic opera written by Gioachino Rossini in 1828. Some of the music originates from his opera Il viaggio a Reims written three years earlier for the coronation of Charles X. The French libretto was by Eugène Scribe and Charles-Gaspard Delestre-Poirson adapted from a comedy they had first written in 1817.

The work is ostensibly a comic opera in that the story is humorous, even farcical. However, it was devised for the Opéra rather than for the Théâtre de l'Opéra-Comique and there are structural inconsistencies with the contemporary opéra comique genre: whereas the latter consists of relatively short lyrical numbers and spoken dialogue, Le comte Ory consists of "highly developed, even massive musical forms linked by accompanied recitative". Although the opera contains some of Rossini's most colorful orchestral writing, the quaint, brief overture is oddly restrained and unassuming, ending with a whisper of pizzicato strings.

== Performance history ==
It was first performed on 20 August 1828 at the Salle Le Peletier by the Paris Opera. It was given in London at the King's Theatre in Italian on 28 February 1829, in New Orleans at the Théâtre d'Orléans on 16 December 1830 and in New York on 22 August 1831.

The work receives numerous productions at opera houses around the world. In April 2011 the opera received its premiere performances at the Metropolitan Opera in New York. The cast included Juan Diego Flórez, Diana Damrau and Joyce DiDonato, singing in a new production directed by Bartlett Sher. This production was broadcast on Metropolitan Opera Live in HD on April 9, 2011. It was revived in 2013 with Flórez repeating his role, but with a different supporting cast.

A 2024 performance by NZ Opera in Auckland, Wellington and Christchurch set the opera in the present day at an ashram (served by the Kingston Flyer) and a women's wellness retreat, both overlooking Lake Wānaka. The Crusaders were a rugby team on an overseas tour, Ory (Manase Latu) disguised himself as a guru, and instead of a trouser role, Isolier (Hanna Hipp) was a lesbian. The surtitles were in very idiomatic informal New Zealand English.

== Roles ==
Stage setting as performed at the Teatro alla Canobbiana in 1830

Roles, voice types, and premiere cast
Role	Voice type	Premiere cast, 20 August 1828 Conductor: François Habeneck
Count Ory	tenor	Adolphe Nourrit
Tutor	bass	Nicolas Levasseur
Isolier	mezzo-soprano (en travesti)	Constance Jawureck
Raimbaud	baritone	Henri-Bernard Dabadie
Countess Adèle	coloratura soprano	Laure Cinti-Damoreau
Ragonde	mezzo-soprano	Augusta Mori
Alice	soprano	
1st Knight	tenor	Alexis Dupont
2nd Knight	tenor	Jean-Étienne-Auguste Massol
3rd Knight	baritone	Henri-Bernard Dabadie the younger
4th Knight	baritone	Ferdinand Prévôt
Chorus of Ory's men, ladies, crusaders, peasants

== Synopsis ==
Time: Circa 1200, during the Crusades
Place: Touraine

=== Act 1 ===
The countryside before the castle of Formoutiers

==== Scenes 1–3 ====
The lords and men of Formoutiers have been away on a crusade. Count Ory, who hopes to seduce Countess Adèle, takes advantage of the situation. Hoping to win her hand, he disguises himself as a hermit, aided by Raimbaud, his friend. Raimbaud announces that a wise hermit will visit the village to offer advice on matters of the heart. The castle is filled with women awaiting their husbands' and brothers' return from the crusades. Ragonde discloses that the countess hopes to have the hermit ease her sadness and Raimbaud assures her that the hermit's skill is unparalleled and has helped many widows find love.

The count Ory, disguised as a hermit, arrives at the castle. The people tell him their wishes and he invites the young ladies to visit him at his hermitage that evening. Ragonde explains that the ladies have sworn to live like widows in the countess's castle while their husbands and brothers are away on the crusade. She tells the disguised Ory that Countess Adèle wishes to speak with him to which he enthusiastically agrees. Ory retires to the hermitage with the women.

==== Scenes 4–6 ====
Ory's page Isolier and the tutor arrive on the scene, resting from their journey in the shade. They explain that the count Ory, who is under the tutor's care, has disappeared. The tutor explains that he is searching for Ory at the behest of Ory's father ("Veiller sans cesse"). When the tutor asks why the page brought him to this place, it is revealed that Isolier wishes to visit the countess's castle.

The ladies and other peasants exit the hermitage. When the tutor sees the pretty girls, he suspects the count is near. The women tell him the hermit came to town eight days ago – the same day the count disappeared from the tutor's watch. His suspicions deepen.

==== Scene 7 ====
Isolier is in love with the countess. He doesn't recognize Ory in disguise, and Isolier confides his love to the hermit, explaining his plan to sneak into the castle disguised as a female pilgrim (Duet: "Une dame de haut parage"). Isolier asks for the hermit's help: when the countess comes to him for advice, he should tell her that her torment is caused by her indifference and that the cure is to love Isolier. Ory likes this idea, but he is resolved to use it for his own ends.

==== Scene 8 ====
Countess Adèle consults the hermit about a cure for her melancholia ("En proie à la tristesse"). He proposes that she fall in love, which she promptly does, with Isolier. The "hermit" warns her not to trust "the faithful page of the terrible Count Ory" and she leads him to the castle.

==== Scene 9 ====
The tutor recognizes Raimbaud and Ory and everyone is shocked when the count's identity is revealed. Adèle receives a letter from her brother announcing that the crusade is over and the men will return to their homeland within two days.

=== Act 2 ===
A large room in the castle

==== Scenes 1–4 ====
A terrible storm persuades the countess and her attendants to welcome a group of fourteen pilgrims surprised by the elements. These pilgrims are actually Ory and his men in disguise. Ory's new disguise is as "Sister Colette". Left alone with the countess, Ory passionately approaches her (Duet: "Ah! quel respect, Madame").

==== Scenes 5–8 ====
Served only milk and fruit for dinner, the "pilgrims" note the lack of wine. Raimbaud to the rescue – he has broken into the castle wine cellar and returns with enough for everyone. They toast the countess's absent brother ("Dans ce lieu solitaire"). Ragonde enters to check on them and they pretend to pray, hiding the bottles. She returns with the countess, who praises them for their piety.

==== Scene 9 ====
Isolier arrives at the castle to let the women know that their husbands and brothers will be arriving at midnight. Upon hearing that the ladies have welcomed a group of pilgrims into the castle, Isolier recognizes that it is Ory and his men. He shares this revelation with the women, who are afraid of what their husbands will think upon finding them in a castle with fourteen men.

==== Scene 10–11 ====
After everyone is in bed, Ory enters Countess Adèle's room. He woos her, not realizing in the dark that it is Isolier's hand he is holding (Trio: "À la faveur de cette nuit obscure").

The men return from the crusade. Isolier reveals himself to count Ory and helps him and his men escape from the castle.

== Recordings ==
Year	Cast: Count Ory, Countess Adèle, Isolier, Ragonde, Raimbaud, Tutor	Conductor, chorus and orchestra	Label
1956	Juan Oncina, Sári Barabás, Cora Canne Meijer, Monica Sinclair, Michel Roux, Ian Wallace	Vittorio Gui; Glyndebourne Festival Chorus and Orchestra, HMV studio recording	CD: Urania, cat: WS 121109; and EMI (2 LPs), cat: RLS 744 (mono)
1959	Michel Sénéchal, Sári Barabás, Cora Canne Meijer, Monica Sinclair, Robert Massard	Vittorio Gui; Chorus and Orchestra of RAI Torino, live in Torino	CD: Arkadia, cat: MP 458.2; and Living Stage, cat: LS 4035130
1979	Rockwell Blake, Ashley Putnam, Faith Esham, Jane Shaulis, David Holloway	Imre Palló; Chorus and Orchestra of New York City Opera, live in New York	CD: Celestial Audio, cat: CA 368
1988	John Aler, Sumi Jo, Diana Montague, Raquel Pierotti, Gino Quilico, Gilles Cachemaille	John Eliot Gardiner; Choeur et Orchestre de l’Opéra de Lyon, studio recording	CD: Philips Classics Records, cat: 422 406-2
1995	William Matteuzzi, Sumi Jo, Marie-Ange Todorovitch, Nadine Chery, Jean-Luc Chaignaud, Gregory Reinhart	Evelino Pidò; Choeur du Festival d’Aix-en-Provence, and Orchestre Européen du Festival, stage-directed by Marcel Maréchal	DVD: Premiere Opera
1997	Marc Laho, Annick Massis, Diana Montague, Jane Shaulis, Ludovic Tézier, Julien Robbins	Andrew Davis; Glyndebourne Festival Chorus and the London Philharmonic Orchestra, stage-directed by Jérôme Savary	DVD: NVC Arts, cat: 0630 18646-2; and Kultur, cat: D 2983
2002	Huw Rhys-Evans, Linda Gerrard, Luisa Islam-Ali-Zade, Luca Salsi, Gloria Montanari, Wojtek Gierlach	Brad Cohen; Czech Philharmonic Choir (from Brno) and the Czech Chamber Soloists, live at Rossini in Wildbad	CD: Naxos Records
2003	Juan Diego Flórez, Stefania Bonfadelli, Marie-Ange Todorovitch, Bruno Praticò, Marina De Liso, Alastair Miles	Jesús López Cobos; Coro da Camera di Praga (chorus master Lubomír Mátl) and Orchestra of Teatro Comunale di Bologna, live in Pesaro	CD: Deutsche Grammophon
2011	Juan Diego Flórez, Diana Damrau, Joyce DiDonato, Stéphane Degout, Susanne Resmark, Michele Pertusi	Maurizio Benini; Chorus and Orchestra of the Metropolitan Opera, stage-directed by Bartlett Sher	DVD: Virgin Classics
2011	Javier Camarena, Cecilia Bartoli, Rebeca Olvera, Liliana Nikiteanu, Oliver Widmer, Ugo Guagliardo	Muhai Tang; Chorus of Zürich Opera and Orchestra La Scintilla (Zürich), stage-directed by Moshe Leiser and Patrice Caurier	DVD: Decca, cat: 001808509
2018	Philippe Talbot, Julie Fuchs, Gaëlle Arquez, Eve-Maud Hubeaux, Jean-Sébastien Bou, Patrick Bolleire	Louis Langrée, Orchestre des Champs-Élysées, Les Éléments, stage-directed by Denis Podalydès	DVD: C major, Unitel; Cat:747504
2018	Leonardo Ferrando, Erika Miklósa, Daniela Pini, Irina de Baghy, Igor Bakan, Lars Arvidson	Tobias Ringborg, Malmö Opera orchestra and chorus, stage-directed by Linda Mallik	DVD:Naxos Records; Cat:2110388
