= Adja Yunkers =

American painter

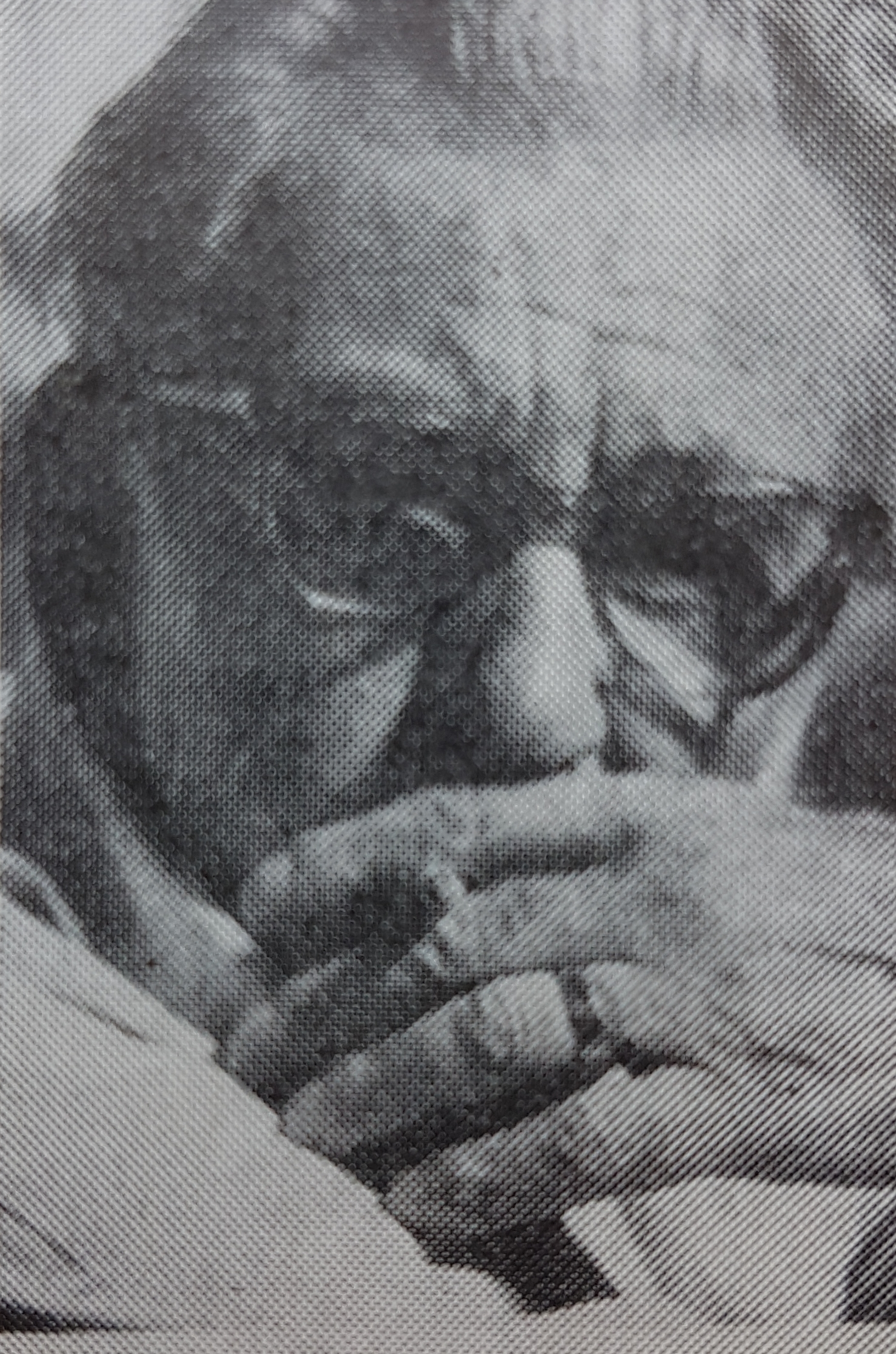
- photographed portrait from Allhem's Swedish artist lexicon.
- Born: 1900; Riga, Governorate of Livonia, Russian Empire
- Died: 1983 (aged 82–83); New York City
- Known for: Painting, printmaking
- Movement: Abstract art

Adja Yunkers (born Adolf Eduard Vilhelm Junker; 1900–1983) was an American abstract painter and printmaker. He was born in Riga, Governorate of Livonia, Russian Empire in 1900. He studied art in Leningrad, Berlin, Paris, and London. He lived in Paris for 14 years, and then moved to Stockholm in 1939. In Stockholm, he published and edited the arts magazines ARS magazine and Creation magazine. In 1947 he moved to the United States, where he lived for the rest of his life. He held a teaching position at the New School for Social Research in New York while summers were spent teaching at the University of New Mexico. In 1949, he received a Guggenheim Fellowship. During the 1950s he primarily worked in color woodcuts, introducing brushwork into the genre. In 1960, he began producing lithographs. He produced two important series of lithographs at the Tamarind Lithography Workshop in Los Angeles―Salt (five lithographs) and Skies of Venice (ten lithographs). Yunkers died in New York City in 1983.

== Permanent collections ==
- Bibliothèque Nationale, Paris
- Boca Raton Museum of Art, Florida
- Brooklyn Museum, New York City
- Cleveland Museum of Art, Ohio
- Corcoran Gallery, Washington, D.C.
- Currier Museum of Art, Manchester, New Hampshire
- Fine Arts Museums of San Francisco, California
- Guggenheim Museum, New York
- Hamburg Kunsthalle, Germany
- Hirshhorn Museum and Sculpture Garden, Washington, D.C.
- Honolulu Museum of Art, Hawaii
- Indianapolis Museum of Art, Indiana
- Museo Pedro Coronel, Zacatecas, México
- Museum of Fine Arts, Boston, Massachusetts
- Museum of Modern Art, New York City
- National Gallery of Art, Washington, D.C.
- Rijksmuseum, Amsterdam
- Seattle Art Museum
- Smart Museum of Art, University of Chicago, Illinois
- Smithsonian American Art Museum, Washington, D.C.
- Stockholm National Gallery, Sweden
- Toledo Museum of Art, Ohio
- University of South Florida Contemporary Art Museum
- Utah Museum of Fine Arts, University of Utah, Salt Lake City
- Victoria and Albert Museum, London
- Whitney Museum of American Art, New York
- Museo de la Solidaridad Salvador Allende, Chile
