= Robert Hughes (American composer) =

American composer and conductor (1933–2022)

Robert Grove Hughes
- Hughes in Kyoto, Japan in 1984.
- Born: 1933; Amherst, New York, US
- Died: 2022 (aged 88–89); Emeryville, California, US
- Era: Contemporary
- Known for: Composer; conductor; bassoonist; music scholar
- Spouse: Margaret Fisher (1996–2022; his death)
- Website: Robert Hughes

Robert Grove Hughes (1933–2022) was an American composer, conductor, bassoonist and music scholar based in the San Francisco Bay Area. He was known for his wide-ranging artistic interests—extending to poetry, performance art and social commentary—and advocacy of contemporary, often experimental music. San Francisco Chronicle critic Joshua Kosman described Hughes as a visionary and "musical Zelig" who "played a key role in a vast range of ambitious and influential musical projects." In the 1960s, Hughes co-founded the long-running Cabrillo Festival of Contemporary Music and co-founded and led the award-winning Oakland Symphony Youth Orchestra. In subsequent decades he co-founded and led the Arch Ensemble for Experimental Music with baritone vocalist Thomas Buckner and co-directed the performance group MA FISH CO with his wife, artist Margaret Fisher.

In his work as a composer and conductor, critics noted Hughes's fluency in an array of different styles, from overtly avant-garde to accessible, and his ambitious, adventurous programs. He wrote commissioned works for the San Francisco Symphony, Oakland Symphony, Cabrillo Festival and San Francisco Ballet and contributed scores to the Hollywood movie Never Cry Wolf and to James Broughton's The Golden Positions. Hughes collaborated with diverse artists including Lou Harrison, Laurie Anderson, Frank Zappa and Ezra Pound, and for more than three decades was a bassoonist in various Bay Area orchestras and groups. He died in Emeryville, California at age 88 on August 11, 2022.

== Education and career summary ==
Hughes was born in Amherst, New York, near Buffalo, in 1933. He began composing music while in high school and attended the University of Buffalo (BA, 1956), where he studied composition with Aaron Copland, Carlos Chávez and Leon Kirchner. After serving as a graduate teaching fellow there, he used a Baird Foundation Fellowship to study composition with Luigi Dallapiccola in Florence in 1959–60.

In 1961, Hughes relocated to Aptos, California to study intonation systems privately with Lou Harrison, beginning a long-time association during which he premiered, arranged, conducted and recorded Harrison's works. That same year they established a musical and theater performance series at a local coffeehouse called the Sticky Wicket; two years later, the series evolved into the Cabrillo Festival of Contemporary Music, an initially informal event that championed their eclectic interests, including chamber music, Stravinsky, aleatoric (or "chance") music and performance art. The still-active, now-two-week event has developed into an internationally recognized venue for experimental and new music. During his long involvement with the festival, Hughes composed, conducted, performed and recruited figures such as Gerhard Samuel and Carlos Chávez as music directors. Hughes joined the Oakland Symphony as a bassoonist in 1962, becoming the orchestra's assistant conductor the following year. In 1964 he co-founded its Youth Chamber Orchestra (YCO, later Oakland Symphony Youth Orchestra or OSYO), serving as conductor until 1970 and again in 1979–80.

While continuing to compose, perform and conduct for various west coast orchestras, Hughes co-founded the Arch Ensemble with baritone vocalist Thomas Buckner in 1972. Under his co-direction, the large chamber group of younger musicians (many former YCO and OSYO members) focused on experimental music within an international and multimedia context into the 1980s. In 1978, Oakland Tribune critic Paul Hertelendy recognized the group for "filling a yawning gap" in Bay Area presentations of contemporary music, while Stereo Review later described their catalog as "almost a map of what is going on in new music, not just out west but in the U.S. as a whole."

In 1974, Hughes met choreographer and dancer Margaret Fisher at the Cabrillo Festival, where both were working on the experimental opera Joan by Beth Anderson. They would become lifelong artistic collaborators, as co-directors of the multimedia group MA FISH CO in the 1980s and 1990s, and later as scholars. They married in 1996. Their work appeared at venues including New Music America, Dance Theater Workshop, the San Francisco Exploratorium and the Venice Biennale. In the 2000s, Hughes continued his scholarship begun in 1958 on the musical works of Ezra Pound with Fisher and began composing his multi-perceptual work, Silenus' Antiphonary.

== Work in music ==
Hughes's main activities in music were composing, conducting and organizing musical programs, scholarship and performing on bassoon, contrabassoon, and the Korean piri. His collaborations with various organizations and people—most notably, the Oakland Symphony and Youth Chamber Orchestra, the Cabrillo Festival, Lou Harrison, the San Francisco Symphony, Arch Ensemble and MA FISH CO—were directed toward experiments in acoustic and electronic music.

=== Conducting ===
Hughes gained early recognition as conductor of the Oakland Youth Chamber Orchestra (YCO) between 1963 and 1970. Under his direction, the YCO's performances, tours and recordings were noted by San Francisco Chronicle and Oakland Tribune critics for their inventive programming and readings, responsiveness to diverse styles, musicality and expressiveness. The orchestra performed commissioned premieres from Laurie Anderson, Henry Brant, Lou Harrison, Ned Rorem and Olly Wilson, an avant-garde music-theater piece by Robert Moran, works by contemporary Mexican composers Carlos Chávez and Silvestre Revueltas, and classical pieces such as Stravinsky's challenging The Rite of Spring.

YCO's 1968 western tour, "A Panorama of California Music," presented a program of rare works (many formerly lost manuscripts recovered by Hughes) from California's gold-rush days and early ethnic groups; they included pieces by French composer Camille Saint-Saëns (Hail, California, 1915) and author Robert Louis Stevenson. In 1970, the orchestra toured black colleges in Texas and Louisiana with "The Black Composer in America," a program championing overlooked music by significant, living composers such as Margaret Bonds, Ulysses Kay, William Grant Still and George Walker. After Hughes returned as conductor in 1979, the renamed OSYO toured Italy, performing classical (Mahler's Tenth; Haydn 71) and contemporary works (Wilson's Reflections; Hughes's own Eclogarii). In 1980, the orchestra won the ASCAP Award for adventuresome programming of contemporary music.

Hughes also conducted several professional orchestras, including: the San Francisco Opera's Western Opera Theater in a latter-day premiere of Pound's 1923 opera, Le Testament de Villon in 1971; the Juneau Symphony in 1973; and the Berkeley Symphony in 1987. He led the Arch Ensemble in compositions by Roscoe Mitchell, Pauline Oliveros, Stockhausen and Charles Wuorinen, as well as in the premiere of Pound's second opera, Cavalcanti (1933), part of an all-Pound concert in 1983. Hughes concluded his conducting career in 1990, leading the Lyon Opera Ballet in two of Frank Zappa’s quirky, angular orchestral scores at the invitation of music director Kent Nagano. Hughes's recordings as a conductor include compositions by Brant, Dallapiccola, Harrison, himself, Pound and Rorem, among others.

=== Composing ===
Critics described Hughes's music as fluent across styles and pluralistic in scope, with an emphasis on invention, wit, color and complexity. Paul Hertelendy characterized his early work as intimate and "non-conformist to the core." Hughes's compositions include pieces for chamber ensemble, symphony orchestra, chorus, performance art and ballet, and film scores for Never Cry Wolf and documentary films. His 1975 score for the US Department of Interior's documentary about the Alaskan wilderness, Magnificence in Trust, combined electronic music integrated with the symphony orchestra, indigenous Inuit vocals and the novel use of elk antlers as a percussion instrument.

Hughes's early compositions often embraced unconventional instruments, groupings, subjects and performance strategies. The tragicomic Elegy for Vietnam Followed by a Protest (1967) employed a bassoon quartet, conventional and experimental material, parody (an irreverent quote of Sousa's The Stars and Stripes Forever) and a "shock ending." Music for the Kama Sutra—originally composed for ballet and performed at the Cabrillo Festival in 1967—incorporated world music instruments; Lou Harrison described it as "open, variegated, dappled with alluring tunes … [whose] purring, burbling and cooing music awakens a lovely erotic apotheosis." Anagnorisis (1971) was a serio-comical solo ballet scored for solo trombone, percussion and garden hose.

After Hughes took up electronic composing in 1970, Carlos Chávez commissioned him to compose three works with electronics for Cabrillo, resulting in Radiances (1971), Auras (1972) and Quadroquartet (1973). Radiances featured an early integration of the synthesizer into orchestral instrumentation; inspired by the poetry of Pound, Robert Browning and William Blake, it was described as an "avant-garde pastoral symphony" whose aural translation of light in all its manifestations was "well-crafted, superbly colored … and immanently listenable." Auras was a lyrical modern composition and performance for four instruments with taped music that immersed the audience in sonic textures; critic Jack Benson wrote that its spatially dislocated performance (with players moving about the theater and aisles) "laid siege to long-established concert hall procedure." Hughes's Synthesis I (1973) was a surreal harp and tape compositions whose sounds began together, drifted apart, and evoked the opening of Stravinsky's Orpheus.

Hughes continued to experiment in his latter-1970s work and to draw upon literary influences. Amo Ergo Sum (1975) was a Dantesque tribute to Pound that placed his poetry within a dense, dramatic choral setting overlaying sung text fragments, speech, shouts and guttural sounds. In a complex commission for the OSYO, Cadences (1976), Hughes again employed spatial play with his instrumentalists along with performative elements (including dual conductors) and a collage-like mix of sounds, forms and intergenerational social commentary. In 1977 as composer-in-residence at the San Francisco Symphony, he composed HCE, a Berlioz-size work titled after Joyce's Finnegans Wake sketch "Here Comes Everybody," which used H, C, E as a musical motif.

In the 1980s and 1990s, Hughes turned to composing for the performance works of Fisher and MA FISH CO. In these eclectic scores, he delved into electronic and acoustic sounds and pulsating Italian punk-rock (for the anti-war piece War Nerves, based on Pound's "Canto XLV"), among other forms. In 2003, he began composing Silenus' Antiphonary, an ambitious multi-perceptual work resembling a "book of days" that was based on the seasons. The composition's seasonal sections feature discrete song settings and instrumental works, as well as standalone transitions, and combine instruments, electronics, recorded texts, poetry and hand-drawn visual art.

=== Scholarship ===
Throughout his career, Hughes conducted research in archives and libraries across the United States and overseas in order to recover, revive and champion overlooked music, including works by Camille Saint-Saëns (Hail, California, 1915) and Robert Louis Stevenson, the artists of his YCO "The Black Composer in America" tour, and Ezra Pound, as well as the indigenous instruments and songs of groups such as Inuit.

His interest in Pound dated back to his college years, when he met Pound in 1958. After conducting Pound's 1923 opera, Le Testament de Villon in its latter-day premiere in 1971, Hughes uncovered long-lost portions of his second opera, Cavalcanti (1933), during a Fulbright residency in Venice, and later, among the uncatalogued Pound papers at Yale University. The discovery led to his conducting the opera's premiere in 1983. Between 2003 and 2011, Hughes collaborated with Fisher on research into Pound's entire musical oeuvre, resulting in five scholarly volumes with engraved scores, facsimile scores, analysis and historical background, issued on their imprimatur Second Evening Art.

=== Performing ===
Hughes was regarded as a virtuoso of both the bassoon and its lower-pitched sibling, the contrabassoon. He worked regularly in a number of west coast orchestras and groups, notably the San Francisco Ballet Orchestra (1963–73), Cabrillo Music Festival orchestra (1963–94), Oakland Symphony Orchestra (1964–86) and San Francisco Opera (1969–79), and between 1984 and 2001, in the Marin, Berkeley and California symphonies. In 2002, he retired from performing.

== Recognition ==
Hughes's composition and performance art activities received support from the Ford Foundation, Rockefeller Foundation, National Endowment of the Arts, Bellagio Study Center (Italy), Exploratorium (San Francisco) and Djerassi Foundation, among others. In 2004 he was elected to the Music Hall of Fame in Buffalo, New York. The 2023 Cabrillo Festival features several of Hughes's works as a posthumous tribute.

Hughes's work as a scholar was recognized by the Fulbright-Hays Program, Beinecke Rare Book & Manuscript Library at Yale University, the American Academy in Rome, Civitella Ranieri Foundation and the Ezra Pound Society (Lifetime Achievement Award, 2013, with Margaret Fisher).

== Selected discography ==
- Music for the Kama Sutra, Second Evening Art (2015)
- Anagnorisis, Second Evening Art (2015)
- HCE, Second Evening Art (2015)
- Sonitudes, 1750 Arch Records (1979)
- Cadences, 1750 Arch Records (1977)
- Ego Scriptor Cantilenae: The Music of Ezra Pound, Other Minds (2012, music director)
- Lou Harrison, Concerto in Slendro, CRI/New World Records (2006, conductor)
- Lou Harrison, Elegaic Symphony, 1750 Arch Records (1977, conductor)
- Lou Harrison, Pacifika Rondo, Phoenix Records/Desto (1971, conductor)
- Lou Harrison, Suite for Violin, Piano & Small Orchestra, New World Records (1988, conductor)
- Ezra Pound, Le Testament, Fantasy Records (1972, conductor)
- The Black Composer in America, Desto (1970, conductor)

== Legacy ==
Since his death in 2022, Hughes' compositions have been performed at venues on the West Coast. The 2023 Cabrillo Music Festival included performances of Uutiqtut and Estampie, as a tribute to Hughes' collaborations with Lou Harrison and his contributions to the festival's history. In February 2025, New Music Works performed Le Quattro Volte at UC Santa Cruz. More recently, the Left Coast Chamber Orchestra performed Sonitudes in February 2026 as part of their Season 33 programs Metamorphosen and Dreaming Chaconne.

== Published works ==
- Le Testament, 1923 facsimile edition with audio CD. With Ezra Pound and Margaret Fisher (2011). ISBN 978-0-9728859-80; audio CD ISBN 978-0-9728859-97
- Le Testament, Paroles de Villon, 1926 and 1933 performance editions. With Ezra Pound and Margaret Fisher (2008). ISBN 978-0-9728859-42
- Complete Violin Works of Ezra Pound (2004). ISBN 978-0-9728859-28
- Cavalcanti: A Perspective on the Music of Ezra Pound. With Ezra Pound and Margaret Fisher (2003). ISBN 978-0-9728859-04
