= Margaret Fisher (artist) =

American performance and media artist

- Born: 1948 (age 77–78); Miami, Florida, United States
- Education: University of California, Berkeley
- Known for: Experimental dance, performance art, film and video, multimedia
- Spouse: Robert Hughes (1996–2022, his death)
- Awards: National Endowment for the Arts, American Academy in Rome Prize, Fulbright-Hays Research Award, Japan-U.S. Artist Exchange Fellowship, Ezra Pound Society
- Website: MA FISH CO

Margaret Fisher, Splitting (1977), Performance at Venice Biennale Carnevale, 1980

Margaret Fisher (born 1948) is an American performance and media artist best known for interdisciplinary works that pair gestural choreography to experimental visual theater characterized by a cartoon aesthetic with wide-ranging cultural references. She emerged amid a 1970s Bay Area experimental performance scene that included artists such as Lynn Hershman Leeson, George Coates, Bill Irwin and Winston Tong, and co-founded the intermedia production group MA FISH CO and the alternative theater Cat's Paw Palace in Berkeley.

Fisher's work has been featured at the Venice Biennale, Dance Theatre Workshop, PS1 and The Kitchen in New York, SFMOMA, Image Forum (Tokyo), and the Musée d'art contemporain de Montréal Mue-danse Festival. It has been reviewed in The New York Times, The Village Voice, Los Angeles Times, La Repubblica, Artweek, San Francisco Chronicle, and Dance Magazine. Critic Rita Felciano describes Fisher's approach as one of "artful intellect" and her multimedia pieces as "demanding puzzles, tightly structured and pervaded by a stillness and internal quiet." Fisher is also an independent researcher and author of books on twentieth-century performance, radio, film and poetry. She lives and works in Emeryville, California and was married to Robert Hughes.

== Life and career ==
Fisher was born in 1948 in Miami, Florida and grew up in a family of painters that included her mother, Ethel Fisher, and sister, Sandra Fisher Kitaj. Her father, Gene Fisher, co-founded F&R Builders in 1954, which became Lennar in 1971 after his departure. In 1966, she attended the University of California, Berkeley where she earned a degree in criminology (AB, 1969) while also learning hatha yoga. In the 1970s, she studied dance and choreography with Margaret Jenkins and contact improvisation with Steve Paxton, co-founded Cat's Paw Palace (1973), and began performing in experimental works of her own and others, such as Alison Knowles, Jim Nollman and George Coates.

In 1976, while performing in Beth Anderson's opera Joan at the Cabrillo Music Festival, Fisher met her future husband, composer-conductor Robert Hughes, co-founder with Tom Buckner of the experimental music group Arch Ensemble. By 1978, they were collaborating on projects that would be performed in Europe, Japan, Canada, and throughout the United States. In 1984, after settling in Emeryville, Fisher and Hughes co-founded MA FISH CO with artist/designer Jerry Carniglia and continued to tour internationally with new and prior works. In 1999, Fisher returned to UC Berkeley, earning MA and PhD degrees in Performance Studies (2002–3); since that time she has devoted much of her time to independent research and writing.

== Artistic work and reception ==
Fisher's artistic output includes experimental dance and performance, installation, film and video, and direction of new music pieces. Some of her most widely discussed early works were performed under her own name (often in collaboration with Hughes) and later reworked by MA FISH CO; from 1983 onward, she developed work both within MA FISH CO and with outside collaborators.

=== Style and early work ===
Fisher's performing style has been characterized as striking in presence, virtuosity and concentration, and difficult to categorize. Her unconventional approach—which she labels "cellular movement"—developed out of studies of yoga and contact improvisation; it is based on the body's energy impulses and movement from the joints, rather than patterns in space or movement across a stage. In addition to yoga, her inspirations include American, Italian and Japanese sign language, martial arts, and Bharatanatyam dance. Critics note as unique to her choreography: chiseled, repetitive gestural isolations that create tension and a sense of pent-up energy; a focus on smaller body parts (hands, fingers, toes, face, neck) rather than the torso for kinetic expression; rhythmic patterns akin to language, poetry or jazz; and movement on a horizontal, pictorial-like plane.

Fisher's early works integrated her idiosyncratic choreography with multimedia technology (low and high), music and poetry, disparate literary and pictorial references, and an introspective sensibility. Critic Charles Shere noted Fisher's approach to using the stage as an area to develop parallel messages (rather than a space to move through), which typically assigned equal weight to elements such as object, light, gesture, rhythm, body, image, sound and word. The New York Times's Jack Anderson described Fisher's early performances as interesting, if obscure, "kinetic puzzles" proceeding by means of metamorphosis, free association, private jokes and far-flung allusions.

Send/Receive (1977, with Liza Béar, Richard Lowenberg, Willoughby Sharp and Keith Sonnier) demonstrated Fisher's embrace of technology; it used a NASA CTS satellite—the first artist-initiated project to do so—to facilitate a performance in which Fisher (in San Francisco) and Nancy Lewis (in New York) responded to one another's movements in real time. Fisher's solo suite, Splitting (1977–82), featured an evolving, increasingly complex movement language that combined immediacy and improvisation, with "moments of bizarre, dadaist lunacy" (involving plucked chickens and a harmonica, among other elements); critic Robert Palmer described it as a fascinating, non-linear work whose flow and rhythmic drive suggested contemporary jazz. The dream-like, minimal performances Gli Insetti and Il Miglior Fabbro (1978–89) referenced the works of entomologist Jean Henri Fabre and offered divergent takes on the scientist's relationship to his object of study. They featured Hughes as "Arturo Scienziato" and Fisher as a woman/insect traversing her life-cycle through movements reviewers termed alternately grotesque, hilarious, and rapacious; composer Robert Ashley called Fisher's choreography, "the most authoritative demonstration of the mechanics of insect movement."

In The True and False Occult (1980–2), Fisher explored new relationships between time, space and language to suggest zero-gravity movement, floating heads on a pilgrimage to Mt. Fuji, text poured from a teapot, calligraphy exercises for disembodied hands, and swimming through water (by means of a mylar pool); Dance critic Jennifer Dunning compared its "bizarre but magical world" to the "interior of a Joseph Cornell box in its simplicity, playfulness and inviting privacy."

Fisher also worked independently with composers Charles Amirkhanian, Beth Anderson, Robert Ashley, Roger Reynolds, Don Buchla, Ivan Wyschnegradsky, and Ron Pellegrino's Real Electric Symphony. She was Lou Harrison's music copyist from the mid-1980s until his death in 2003 and set two video works to his music in 2017.

MA FISH CO, The Bride Stripped Bare by her bachelors even… (1984), Performance still from 1986. Pictured left to right, Tony Gnazzo, Larry London, Jerry Carniglia, Bob Hughes, Toyoji Tomita. Costumes by Cynthia DuVal

=== MA FISH CO ===
MA FISH CO (founded in 1983) brought together Fisher's direction, performance and choreography, Hughes's electronic and acoustic music scores, and Jerry Carniglia's stage design and sculptures in performances, installations and mixed-media works that increasingly incorporated video, slide projection, and the participation of performer-technicians. Oakland Tribune critic Janice Ross described their work as "dense layerings of stories, visions and subplots" that mixed "surrealist sets, props and symbolic costumes [and] witty and idiosyncratic choreography."

The Bride Stripped Bare By Her Bachelors, Even (1984) was an experimental, dadaist opera that Fisher choreographed and designed for composer Charles Shere (later re-conceived independently by Fisher for MA FISH CO in 1994). The opera was inspired by Duchamp's eponymous work on glass. It coupled threat and wit in an exploration of the absurdist theme of mechanized sex, partly expressed through the angular gestural language of an army of bachelors—commanded by the bride (Fisher)—who never achieve fulfillment; its complex "moving tableaux vivants" included stark sets by Carniglia, Chris McFee and Fisher, machinery and mechanical devices, chance sound fragments and unconventional music.

Three interdisciplinary performance works—AG Nature (1983–9), Antebellum Bedlam (1985–6) and Vice Versa (1986–8)—investigate historically determined "crimes against nature" (usury, sodomy, war), themes drawn from the writings of Dante and Pound, and imagery inspired during Fisher's fellowship year in Japan. AG Nature included War Nerves, which featured a woman wearing a red and yellow mortarboard and seated on the floor amid flickering TVs, whose gestures translate Pound's Canto XLV into Japanese and Italian sign language, and Little Sodomy Piece, which features Hughes's hypnotically compelling score (likened by critic Tony Reveaux to the sound of weasels in heat) and a performer costumed like a Japanese ghost character, whose stark Japanese Butoh dancing suggests violence and anguished compulsion. Antebellum Bedlam offered a highly crafted, surreal universe of flying cartoon boats, a sculpted air-craft carrier hosting MAFISHCO's multi-media orchestra, a bank of slide and film strip projectors doubling as gun barrels, and pulsating music by Hughes (doubling as General Douglas MacArthur) to tell of Korean War animosities.

In City of Dis (1989–90)—based on a two-sentence Cocteau story about a pet chameleon placed on a piece of plaid to keep warm that dies of exhaustion—Fisher created flat, two-dimensional choreography (focused on the torso and upper body with minimal foot movement) performed close to the audience. Critics wrote that it took "internally generated movement to fresh and visually rich new extremes" with an entrancing intimacy "like a peeping Tom intruding into a private world." In the two installation works, Reliquary for the River Styx (1989) and Reliquary for the River Marsyas (1992), MA FISH CO elaborated themes from Vice Versa and City of Dis, including references to Dante and mythology; their elements included performance, viewer participation, and a genuflection bench, reliquary, and video tower.

Fisher's performance and film and video archive, including that of MA FISH CO, is housed at the New York Public Library Jerome Robbins Dance Division.

MA FISH CO, Ag Nature (1983–9). Performance still, 1985. Pictured: Julius Webster as Pulcinella at Dance Theatre Workshop, New York City, 1985. Sets by Jerry Carniglia, costumes by Jacqueline Humbert

=== Film & video collaborations ===
Fisher/MA FISH CO's film and video projects have screened internationally (Image Forum Tokyo, Mill Valley Film Festival, Centre Pompidou) and earned experimental film awards from the Venice Biennale (Liquid Movie, 1981, with Fabrizio Plessi), Sony Visions of America, and the Milan and Montreal film festivals, among others. Fisher experimented with film and video early in her career, in works such as Saxophone (1977, with John Adams) and Thermographic Video Cartoons (1979, with Richard Lowenberg)—whose images were produced using thermal imaging technology developed for the Vietnam War—and more extensively with MA FISH CO.

MA FISH CO describes its heavily layered films as "faux-foreign"—shot in foreign languages with English subtitles and designed with a foreign-film aesthetic (e.g., the grainy, Russian-influenced The Üble Marionette, 1992). The Letter P, The Story of Pulcinella (1997) combines puppets and live action, music and text in a poetic, allusion-filled re-imagining of the Italian commedia dell'arte figure Pulcinella that explores historical connections to European anti-Semitism and themes of ghettoization and survival. Other films reconsider or refashion the works of artists like Marcel Duchamp (Letters of Duchamp, 1994 with Charles Shere) or continue the theme of zero gravity (Spider and the Fly, 1993).

== Cat's Paw Palace ==
Cat's Paw Palace was an alternative, free-form theater co-founded by Fisher and Gregory Bentley, which opened in Berkeley's historic Sawtooth Building in 1973 and was the first artist-run venue in the East Bay. The space was a venue for experimental dance, theater, music, poetry, performance, video and film, that emphasized collaboration, improvisation, audience proximity and dialogue. Cat's Paw drew on a network of West Coast underground artists from Vancouver to San Diego; in addition to featuring some of Fisher's early work, it presented approximately 600 artists between 1973 and 1977, including Lauren Elder and Carolee Schneeman, Kei Takei's Moving Earth dance company, ODC/Dance, musician G. S. Sachdev, and poets David Melnick and Ron Silliman. The theater's archive is housed at the San Francisco Museum of Performance and Design.

MA FISH CO, Antebellum Bedlam, Performance still, 1985. Pictured: Dominica Kriz at KALA Institute, Berkeley, CA, 1985

== Writing and publishing ==
Since 2002, Fisher has written as an academic and independent researcher (often collaborating with Hughes), publishing on twentieth–century performance, film, radio and poetry, including books on futurism and the music of Ezra Pound; her study, Ezra Pound's Radio Operas: The BBC Experiments, 1931–1933 (2002), received an Ezra Pound Society Book Award. She has written several books published through her and Hughes's imprimatur, Second Evening Art, including: Tempo as an Organizing Principle in the 1924 Film Ballet mécanique (2016) and The Recovery of Ezra Pound's Third Opera, Settings of Poems by Catullus and Sappho (2005). In 2012, Fisher also published her English translation of RADIA by Italian Futurist poet and playwright Pino Masnata with introduction and appendices.

Fisher has also written articles on Pound's work for the publications Performance Research, Music@, Yale University Library Gazette and Make It New, and the books, Encyclopedia of Ezra Pound (2005), Ezra Pound in Context (2009), and The Companion to Ezra Pound and the Arts (2019). She has also contributed to the books, Futurism and the Technological Imagination (2009) and Handbook of International Futurism (2019), and the journals, Italogramma, Modernism/Modernity, and Conjunctions.

== Awards and recognition ==
Fisher has been recognized for her artistic and academic work. She received an Ezra Pound Society Lifetime Achievement Award with Robert Hughes (2013), an American Academy in Rome Prize for Modern Italian Studies (2009), and a Civitella Ranieri Foundation visiting scholar residency for her research and writing. As an artist, she was awarded three National Endowment for the Arts (NEA) Choreographer Fellowships, three NEA Interarts Project awards, a California Arts Council Fellowship, a Djerassi Foundation Bessie Schönberg Fellowship, and commissions for new works by the KALA Institute, Jerome Foundation, Opera at the Institute/PS1, and Fine Arts Museums of San Francisco, among others. Fisher has also received a Japan-U.S. Artist Exchange Fellowship, a Fulbright-Hays Research Award to Italy, and travel awards and artist residencies from Djerassi, Exploratorium in San Francisco, Giovanni Poli's Teatro L'Avogaria (Venice), and Lake Placid Center for the Arts (1983).

== Selected published works ==
- "Radio and Sound Art," in Handbook of International Futurism. Berghaus, Ed. (2019). ISBN 978-3-11-027347-2
- "The Expansion of a Theory: Great Bass and Ballet mécanique," in The Companion to Ezra Pound and the Arts. Preda, Ed. (2019). ISBN 978-1474429177
- Tempo as an Organizing Principle in the 1924 Film Ballet mécanique, an Analysis, and Other Essays on Modernism and Futurism (2016). ISBN 978-1-9413570-19
- The Transparency of Ezra Pound's Great Bass (2013). ISBN 978-1-9413570-88
- The Echo of Villon in Ezra Pound’s Music and Poetry, Ezra Pound’s Duration Rhyme (2013). ISBN 978-1-9413570-71
- RADIA, A Gloss of the 1933 Futurist Radio Manifesto by Pino Masnata. Editor, Introduction, Translation (2012). ISBN 978-1-6136463-73
- Le Testament, 1923 facsimile edition with audio CD. With Ezra Pound and Robert Hughes (2011). ISBN 978-0-9728859-80; audio CD ISBN 978-0-9728859-97
- "Futurism and Radio," in Futurism and the Technological Imagination. Berghaus, Ed. (2009). ISBN 978-90-420-2747-3
- Le Testament, Paroles de Villon, 1926 and 1933 performance editions. With Ezra Pound and Robert Hughes (2008). ISBN 978-0-9728859-42
- The Recovery of Ezra Pound's Third Opera, Settings of poems by Catullus and Sappho (2005). ISBN 978-0-9728859-35
- Cavalcanti: A Perspective on the Music of Ezra Pound. With Ezra Pound and Robert Hughes (2003). ISBN 978-0-9728859-04
- Ezra Pound's Radio Operas, The BBC Experiments, 1931–1933 (2002). ISBN 0-262-06226-7
- Palm Leaf Patterns (1976). ISBN 0-915572-20-6
