= Will Barnet =

American artist (1911–2012)

- Born: May 25, 1911; Beverly, Massachusetts, United States
- Died: November 13, 2012 (aged 101); New York City, New York, United States
- Education: School of the Museum of Fine Arts, Boston; Art Students League of New York
- Occupations: Visual artist, teacher
- Known for: Painting, printmaking
- Awards: Chevalier de l'Ordre des Arts et des Lettres (National Medal of Arts List of recipients of the National Medal of Arts)

Will Barnet (May 25, 1911 – November 13, 2012) was an American visual artist and teacher, known for his paintings, watercolors, drawings, and prints depicting the human figure and animals, both in casual scenes of daily life and in transcendent dreamlike worlds.

== Early life, family, and education ==
Will Barnet was born on May 25, 1911, in Beverly, Massachusetts. His father worked as a machinist in a shoe factory. Barnet knew by the age of ten that he wanted to be an artist.

As a student, he studied with Philip Leslie Hale at the School of the Museum of Fine Arts, Boston. While in school he viewed first-hand John Singer Sargent at work on the murals of the Boston Public Library.

In 1930, Barnet moved to New York City to study at the Art Students League of New York, with Stuart Davis and Charles Locke, beginning his long association with the school. Here he concentrated on painting as well as printmaking. After arriving in New York City, Barnet met Arshile Gorky.

Barnet had three sons, Peter, Richard, and Todd Barnet, by his first wife Mary Sinclair. Barnet later married Elena Barnet, with whom he had a daughter, Ona Barnet.

== Teaching ==
In 1936, he became the official printer for the Art Students League of New York. He taught art alongside the likes of Yasuo Kuniyoshi, Robert Beverly Hale and Richard Pousette-Dart. There, he later instructed students in the graphic arts at the school. Barnet taught and mentored the early careers of artists Audrey Flack, Emily Mason, Brett Bigbee, Mavis Pusey, Lois Dodd, Raymond A. Whyte, Mark Rothko, Abby Leigh, and Jim Rosenquist. Barnet influenced a generation of artists, including James Rosenquist, Knox Martin, Emil Milan, Paul Jenkins, Ethel Fisher and Cy Twombly.

Barnet continued his love of teaching with positions at the Cooper Union, at Yale University, and at the Pennsylvania Academy of Fine Arts. He was represented by the Bertha Schaefer Gallery in New York City.

== Artworks ==
Barnet's works span the various "movements" of their era, from his early social realist work to his final signature style of clean lines and carefully placed volumes of solid color in a kind of minimalist representational approach. His work is concerned with humanity, yet at his core he always remained a formalist, cerebral in his approach to the elements that make up a good picture. In his interviews he articulated his well thought out principles regarding color use, composition and subject matter, in a professorial manner reflecting the theoretical acumen he brought to his teaching. Like many American painters of his generation he was digesting the evolving trends in Europe and integrating the new visual vocabulary into his American style while remaining universal, referencing his own personal history with images of his wife, his daughter, and their family pets. As James Thomas Flexner wrote, Barnet's work "makes us experience the interplay between the personal and the universal." While remaining representational, the simple elegance of the figures and their flat surfaces reflect his exploration with abstraction.

Will's artistic output spans eighty years. Few artists, other than Picasso or Monet, can claim such a long continuous period of inspired art making, nor the logical progression of moving through artistic phases: in the 1930s he was a social realist, in the 1940s a Modernist, in the 1950s an Abstract Expressionist and in the 1960s and onward he settled on a representational minimalism honed from the refinement of his earlier explorations. His early work is decidedly social realist, with sullen portraits done in dark tonalities that suggest both the struggle of the depression era and the hope in the simple love of family life. He moves out of this phase with the improving economy and in the 1940s adds vibrant color and more abstract figures, suggesting a lifting of the depression era malaise. He was a key figure in the 1940s New York movement called Indian Space Painting, artists who based their abstract and semi-abstract work on Native American art; a striking movement which had a handful of practitioners (notably Steve Wheeler). In the 1950s he evolved into his form of Abstract Expressionism, which is more studied and less "spontaneous", creating formally pleasing paintings of well ordered shape and color. His later work returned entirely to figurative painting. He is probably best known for these enigmatic portraits of family, made from the 1970s onwards, notably the Silent Seasons series, which contrasts his earlier works edginess and brooding contemplation that becomes more remarkable when compared with the more placid and pretty works which followed his second marriage. Within his oeuvre one can chart the evolution of American painting trends of which Will was on the forefront, as well as the joys and vicissitudes of his personal life, with his first marriage ending in divorce and his second marriage providing a more stable family life, reflected in the harmonious compositions of domestic tranquility of his later work.

In 2011, his retrospective exhibition, "Will Barnet at 100" was held at the National Academy Museum in New York City.

Barnet was also an active member of the Society of American Graphic Artists.

== Awards and honors ==
Barnet was the recipient of numerous awards, including the first Artist's Lifetime Achievement Award Medal given on the occasion of the National Academy of Design's 175th anniversary, the College Art Association's Lifetime Achievement Award, the Philadelphia Academy of Fine Arts' Lippincott Prize, and the American Academy and Institute of Arts and Letters' Childe Hassam Prize. He was an elected member of the National Academy of Design, the Century Association, and the American Academy of Arts and Letters.

Barnet defined an artistic career that, in the words of Robert Doty, "has always gone beyond the limitations of modern art because his work affirms a faith in life." Barnet was awarded the 2011 National Medal of Arts by President Barack Obama. In 2012, France conferred the insignia of Chevalier of the Order of Arts and Letters on Barnet. Will Barnet was a member of the American Abstract Artists.

== Death and legacy ==
Barnet was a longtime resident of the National Arts Club. He died on November 13, 2012, at the age of 101, in New York City.

His artworks are in public collections in the United States, including, at the National Gallery of Art, the Metropolitan Museum of Art, the Whitney Museum of American Art, the Museum of Modern Art, New York, the Museum of Fine Arts, Boston, the Philadelphia Museum of Art, The Jewish Museum, the Art Museum of Southeast Texas, and the San Francisco Museum of Modern Art. He has been the subject of over eighty solo exhibitions held at the Virginia Museum of Fine Arts, the Museum of American Art of the Pennsylvania Academy of Fine Arts, the National Academy of Design Museum, the National Museum of American Art, Montclair Art Museum, the Boca Raton Museum of Art, Crystal Bridges Museum of American Art, and the Worcester Art Museum, among others.
