= Ashbee =

Ashbee is a surname. Notable people with the surname include:

- Barry Ashbee (1939–1977), Canadian ice hockey player
- Charles Robert Ashbee (1863–1942), English designer and entrepreneur
- Henry Spencer Ashbee (1834–1900), English merchant, book collector, writer, and bibliographer
- Ian Ashbee (born 1976), English footballer
- Paul Ashbee (1918–2009), British archaeologist
- Stan Ashbee (born 2006), English-born Irish footballer
- W. N. Ashbee (1852–1919), British railway architect

== See also ==
- Ashby (disambiguation)
