= Sandra Fisher =

American artist (1947–1994)

- Fisher, 1980s
- Born: Sandra Maureen Fisher; 6 May 1947; New York City, U.S.
- Died: 19 September 1994 (aged 47); London, England
- Education: Chouinard Art Institute
- Known for: Painting
- Spouse(s): Garry Gregson (divorced) R. B. Kitaj (m. 1983)
- Parent(s): Ethel Fisher and Gene Fisher
- Relatives: Margaret Fisher (sister)

Sandra Maureen Fisher (6 May 1947 – 19 September 1994), was an American figure painter based in London and who was born in New York City.

== Biography ==
Fisher was born on 6 May 1947 in New York City and her family moved in 1948 to Miami, where her father Gene Fisher was a homebuilder. Her mother, Ethel Fisher, was a painter who taught her to draw and paint at an early age; her sister is the performance and media artist, Margaret Fisher. In 1961, her mother abandoned the family to travel in Europe and, after a divorce, set up her studio in New York. Sandra graduated from Metter High School (Metter, Georgia, 1965) and, after moving to Los Angeles, California, enrolled in art school. Her first marriage to Garry Gregson ended in divorce in 1970. After a brief return to Los Angeles, Fisher moved to London on 8 August 1971 to pursue a painting career full-time. She died at the age of 47 from hyperacute haemorrhagic leuco-encephalitis (not an aneurysm, as is commonly written).

Fisher studied minimalist art and sculpture, graduating in 1968 with a BFA from the Chouinard Art Institute, but soon recognised that her compelling ambition was to be an intimate, observational painter.

From 1970 to 1971 she was personal administrative assistant to the American printmaker Ken Tyler at Gemini G.E.L., the print atelier he founded in Los Angeles. During this period Fisher re-united with her mother, who now lived and painted in Los Angeles and who once again became an important source of inspiration as well as an intellectual ally. At Gemini, she met Robert Irwin and R. B. Kitaj; each had a profound if contradictory influence on Fisher's own developing philosophy of art. She worked a few hours a week for the historian Ariel Durant, whose ideas about art history helped her come to terms with her current emphasis on style, an artifact from her years at Chouinard. Durant warned her against painting "death masks" like one might see in Greek cemeteries and encouraged her to embody her figures with life. Within a short time Fisher distanced herself from conceptual art to favor portraiture, the male and female nude, and depictions of dancers, singers, actors and musicians. She occasionally sat in on classes by David Hockney at the Slade School of Fine Art and from 1975 began to hire models to sit for her. Later in her career, intrigued by the writing of Paris-based painter Avigdor Arikha about plein-air painting and his practice of alla prima painting, she sought to complete a picture in one session. She was an invited lecturer at art schools in and around London, and she often spoke on women painters.

Fisher was a figure of London's art community, a trained musician (clarinet) and avid reader and art historian as well as painter. She enjoyed popularity with London commuters (1989–91) for her posters commissioned by the London Transport Art on the Underground series, notably her colourful, languid image of boating in Regent's Park, Days on the water and her Lazy days, by Tube poster.

She collaborated with the poet Thomas Meyer on three books (see below) and her drawings often appeared in the journal London Magazine. She obtained permission to draw at opera rehearsals in London, including that of Wozzeck. Her work entered collections held by the British Museum ("Sappho in Old Age," a 1971 pastel), the London Transport Museum; Pembroke College, Cambridge; and the New York Metropolitan Museum of Art, among others. She created a series of paintings for Heineken Brewery as part of a 1993 commission. Her exhibition of paintings and monotypes at the Lefevre Gallery in London, 1993, represented the full scope of her interests, including a number of paintings from a new series of Shakespearean subjects commissioned by the Globe Theatre on Bankside. She died before completing the commission.

When Fisher and R. B. Kitaj re-met in London in October 1971, they began a long-term personal and professional relationship. Fisher was hired by Marlborough Gallery in 1972 as Kitaj's studio assistant. Fisher and Kitaj married in 1983. Their son Max was born in 1984 and Fisher became stepmother to Kitaj's two children from a prior marriage.

After her death, Kitaj was to write: "She came into my life in 1970 as a passionate Jewishness began to form crazily in me. She seemed like a shining California miracle of new-old Jewish womanhood invented in the Diaspora." In his late paintings, Kitaj depicts himself as the slightly absurd, much older and smaller, white-bearded but still sexually charged man, embracing the beautiful, voluptuously serene young Sandra, as Shekhinah, the Kabbalah's female aspect of God. In Los Angeles No. 13 (2002) the two of them are pushing an old-fashioned pram with a Hockneyesque child in it reminiscent of the ensemble pushed by a Warburgian Maenad four decades earlier in the Ohio Gang. By this time, Kitaj: "no longer needed to explain his symbolism for his medium merged seamlessly with his message and his dreams were at last fulfilled in art rather than life. His extraordinary visual and intellectual literacy and his lifelong aspiration to be part of the great tradition finally come together in this series of portrayals, not of a mountain, a la Cézanne, nor of depressingly isolated individuals (even when depicted alongside others) a la Lucian Freud, whose victims lie on beds or sofas like analysands in his grandfather's consulting room, but rather in intense communion with each other, in what, politely preferring his own artistic vision to Freud's, Kitaj calls: "the greatest story ever told, the Woman-Man Story". Contextualising his credo in echoing Nietzsche's reminder of the relationship between creativity and the truism that "procreation depends on the duality of the two sexes", Kitaj writes that this "Story":

"has become quite rare in painting since the death of Picasso… My Sandra was an exception. She often painted nude men and women embracing. Her example has been a major influence on me. So I've done about 20 of these love stories so far, and our romance need not die".

In view of what he says here it is especially appropriate that in one of the finest examples in this series, Los Angeles No. 22 (Painting-Drawing) of 2001, Kitaj depicts himself with his by now much younger wife seated on his lap." Sandra is recording the outline of the shadow behind him in an evocation of the Plinyan myth of The Origin of Painting, as depicted by the 18th-century artist, David Allan.

Writing for The Guardian in 2008, Germaine Greer noted that: "Sandra Fisher survives in her husband's writing not as a fellow painter, but as Shekhina, the female aspect of the deity of the Kabbalah with whom he seeks union. But Fisher was not divine; she was very, very human. She was one of the first women painters to succeed in painting the male nude as an object of desire. Her boys lie spread-eagled on tumbled sheets, their flushed skin bathed in the golden luminosity of summer afternoons."

In 2006, an exhibition of Fisher's work as well as portraits of her by other artists was held at the New York Studio School. The Charles E. Young Research Library at the University of California, Los Angeles, also holds a small collection of Fisher's papers.

In 2026, a group exhibition at Kunstmuseum Den Haag's entitled London Calling featured the work of artists working in London in the late 20th century. Sandra Fisher's work was included alongside works by Francis Bacon, Lucian Freud, David Hockney, Paula Rego, Frank Auerbach and others, as part of a conversation about lesser-known but noteworthy artists.

== Books ==
Three books with the poet, Thomas Meyer:

- Sappho, London: Coracle Press, 1982;
- Sonnets & Tableaux, London: Coracle Press, 1987;
- Monotypes & Tracings/German Romantics, London: Enitharmon Press, 1993.
