= Donray =

American painter (born 1945)

- Artist Donray in January, 2009
- Born: July 29, 1945 (age 81); Houston, Texas
- Known for: Painter (acrylics and pastels)
- Movement: Postmodern Expressionism

Donray (born Donald Arvin Ray; July 29, 1945) is a contemporary American artist in the style of Postmodern Expressionism with elements of Surrealism, Futurism and Fauvism. He is included in the Who's Who in American Art. He is known for metaphorical imagery exploring the dynamic nature of life and the human desire for spiritual enlightenment and fulfillment.

Donray's subjects include figures, objects and landscapes in motion, and his methods include acrylic on various media including Masonite, paper, canvas, and drawings in charcoal, conte crayon, and color pastels. His works have been collected and shown by a number of notable people and entities.

Donray may be best known for an innovative technique he uses in his acrylic works, a technique he has pioneered. It involves an acrylic-on-acrylic collage. The collage material is the same as that being used to paint with, and developed through a tedious process of mixing, pouring, manipulation and cutting. The result is a dramatic display of intermingling color, texture, depth, reflecting light, motion and energy.

== Background ==
=== Early life and development as an artist ===
Donray was born Donald Arvin Ray in Houston, Texas, July 29, 1945. He showed an interest in art at an early age and learned to draw from his mother. After service in the U.S. Marine Corps, he studied law at Baylor University, and also studied painting privately while in school. He lived and worked in East Texas until 1989 when he moved to Dallas, living in the colorful Deep Ellum section of that city from 1990 to 1993.

In 1993, Donray moved to New York, locating first in the DUMBO area of Brooklyn and later moving to Manhattan, maintaining a studio on 14th Street near 7th Avenue on the border between Greenwich Village and Chelsea. While in New York, he became friends with artists Knox Martin, Norman Bluhm, Mel Chin, Carl Ashby and Irv Tepper, and critic and museum curator James Harithas. He also was friends with industrial music pioneer J.G. Thirlwell of the band Foetus, whose portrait he painted. Donray regularly attended the lectures of Knox Martin at the Art Students League of New York, and was so impressed that Martin became a trusted and reliable mentor to the artist. Many consider Donray's New York years as his formative period. Six years later, in 1999, Donray returned to Texas.

=== Critical success and mainstream following ===
In the late 1990s and early 2000s, Donray slowly built a critical following for his work. Some of his best-known works to date were created in this period, including the acrylic-on-canvas paintings Woman in a Boat and Blue Laced Red Wyandotte (both in the Allegiance Capital collection), his Butterfly Series, and Trouble in the Chute, purchased by billionaire Bob McNair, a businessman, philanthropist and owner of the Houston Texans. The work hangs at NRG Stadium (formerly Reliant Stadium) in Houston. Actor Johnny Depp also owns a Donray painting.

In early 2009, his art received increasing mainstream popularity and attention, signified by the announced February purchase of a broad cross-section of his works by Allegiance Capital Corporation, an investment-banking firm. In April, Prestige Financial Center, a financial services company, purchased three of his works.

== Work and technique ==
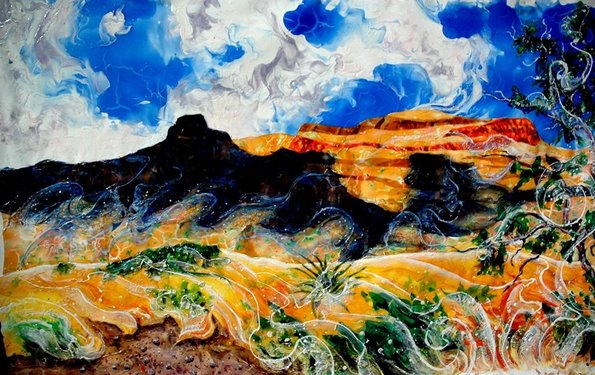
Shadow Mountain (acrylic on linen canvas)

Donray describes himself as fiercely independent in both his work and his influences, and as such has been influenced not only by Expressionism, Futurism, Surrealism and Fauvism, but also by Baroque, Romanticism, and German Expressionism. In the artist's statement he posted to his website in 2010, he said, "I reject the labels that have been placed upon me by those who have written about my work. While some of what has been written about my art contains a measure of truth, the labels are meaningless. I acknowledge the influence of some artists that have come before me, but I am not an 'expressionist' nor am I a 'surrealist,' a 'fauvist' or a 'futurist.' My goals and aspirations are different from those who were categorized as such and so is my art. If I have borrowed anything from any of those artists or movements, it has been to use as components to forge a new form of expression that is my own."

His work is described by critics and other artists as “fierce,” “at once raw and refined” (Donald Kuspit); “vertiginous and confrontational” (Knox Martin); “figurative, abstract and American” (Edward Lucie-Smith); “complex and luminous” (Ruth Bass); and “vibrant with near violent colors” (Harold Rubin, The Rivington Gallery, London, UK).

Donray emphasizes color and a "primacy of motion" in which he sees "everything as being in a constant state of flux – even inanimate objects." He regularly experiments with various unique techniques using acrylics and pastels. His innovative technique in his acrylic works, a technique he pioneered, involves an acrylic-on-acrylic collage created by the artist. Unlike the collage material used by other artists, Donray uses the same material as what is being used to paint with, and develops it through a tedious process of mixing, pouring, manipulation and cutting. He also creates works using charcoal on paper.

Thematically, his work touches on "living and survival, spiritual quest and warning." Most frequent subjects are nudes; the earth; dancers, musicians and performers; wild things; and Native American dancers.

== Critical analysis ==
"The works of Donray have, as a central vibration, major rhymes of his physiognomy that are like dashes of pique reflecting off encounters of the wondrous with excitement in hustling technique that is masterfully appropriate for his motif of luminous and vertiginous confrontations. What a rush!"- Knox Martin, NY abstract expressionist

"The paintings demonstrate an inverted approach; gentle and focused at the same time being super-macho and withdrawn. Viewers are invited to draw near but not to intrude on the artist’s thoughts…" - Edward Lucie-Smith, international art critic

"There is a verve, an energy, a dynamic surging gesture, violent movement, an overall vividness and vitality – that places Donray’s paintings among the most interesting of what might be called post-modern expressionist painting." - Donald Kuspit, art critic, poet, and professor

== Bibliography ==
- John Austin, “A Vocation Years in the Making,” Fort Worth Star-Telegram, Fort Worth, July 29, 2000
- Ruth Bass, Donray, Visual Prayer, Essay for Exhibition Catalogue, Klara Kohl Gallery, New York, 1998
- Ruth Bass, “New York? New York!” Art-Talk, Vol. XXII, Number 1, Scottsdale, Arizona, 1998
- Nan Coulter, “HP Goes to a Party,” Dallas Morning News, Dallas, January 23, 2000
- Donald Kuspit, Donray and Expressionism, Essay for Exhibition Catalogue, So Hyun Gallery, New York, 2000
- Donald Kuspit, Ruth Bass, Dominic Luytens, "Donray, A Cross-Section," Reprint of essays from previous catalogues for exhibition catalogue, Arlington Museum of Art, Arlington, Texas, 2008
- Edward Lucie-Smith, Statement for Exhibition Catalogue, The Rivington Gallery, Ltd., London 1999
- Knox Martin, Donray, A Statement, Klara Kohl Gallery, New York, 1998
- Harold Werner Rubin, Statement for Exhibition Catalogue, The Rivington Gallery, Ltd., London 1999
- Marcus Skiersky, Donray, Essay in Exhibition Brochure, V. Brooks Gallery, Dallas, 1989 (reprinted in X-POSE)
- Angie Summers, “Out and About in Arlington,” Fort Worth Star-Telegram, Fort Worth, January 19, 2000
- Vicki Thacker, “Donray: An Interview,” XPOSE, Dallas, 1991

== Dealers ==
Donray has dealers in New York City, London, and in the Dallas/Fort Worth area where he works and resides.
