= Thomas Ashby =

Thomas Ashby may refer to:

- Thomas Ashby (archaeologist) (1874–1931), British archaeologist
- Thomas Ashby (doctor) (1848–1916), American doctor, academic, writer, and politician
- Tom Ashby (1895–1957), mayor of Auckland, New Zealand
- Thomas Ashby (MP) (fl. 1414), member of parliament for Leicestershire
- Thomas Ashby (martyr) (died 1544), English religious dissident
