= Ashby Manor Historic District =

Historic district in Iowa, United States

- U.S. National Register of Historic Places
- U.S. Historic district
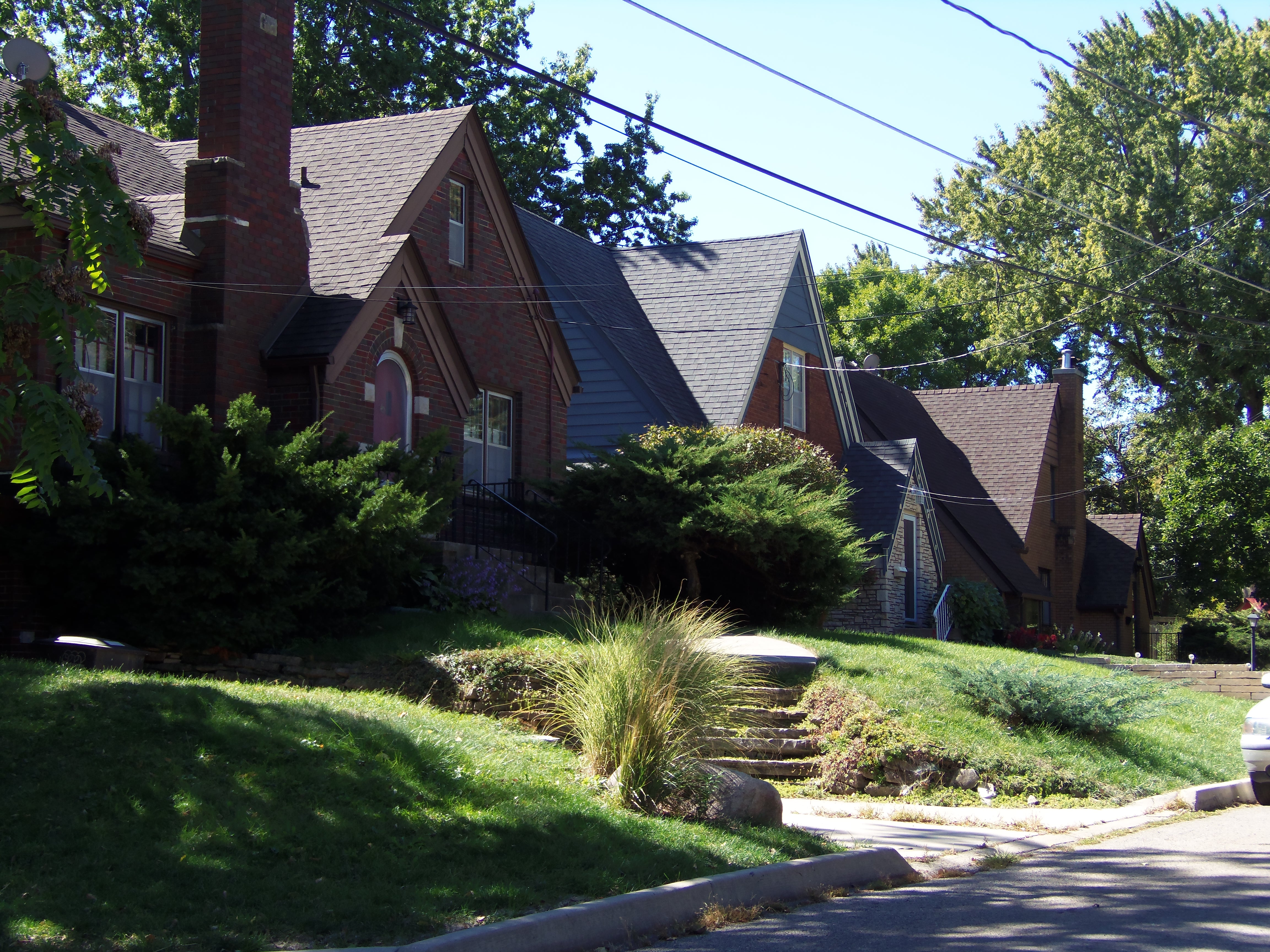

- Location within Iowa Location within the United States
- Location: Roughly bounded by Beaver Ave. and Ashby Park; Des Moines, Iowa
- Coordinates: 41°37′30″N 93°40′23″W
- Area: 28 acres (11 ha)
- Architect: E.T. McMurray; Guy McDowell
- MPS: Suburban Development in Des Moines Between the World Wars, 1918--1941 MPS
- NRHP reference No.: 92001150
- Added to NRHP: September 4, 1992

The Ashby Manor Historic District is located in northwest Des Moines, Iowa, United States. It is a residential area that lies between Beaver Avenue, which is a major north–south artery, on the west and Ashby Park on the east. The historic period of the housing was 1925–1941. The street layout follows a curving pattern, which differentiates it from the grid pattern of the surrounding area. The streets also feature a mature tree canopy. The historic district has 148 properties of which 99 are houses and 49 are garages. Ninety-one properties are considered contributing properties and 57 are noncontributing. It has been listed on the National Register of Historic Places since 1992. It is a part of the Suburban Development in Des Moines Between the World Wars, 1918--1941 MPS.

== Architecture ==
The houses generally follow the conventional Tudor Revival and Colonial Revival styles as well a local variation of the Tudor style called "Beaverdale Brick". There are both brick and frame structures that are 1½ and 2-stories and feature intersecting gables. A few of the houses are also constructed of limestone and of concrete block masonry. Some of the houses have a garage integrated into the houses design. Others were not built with garages and they were added at some point after World War II, and therefore do not contribute to the historic nature of the neighborhood. The more modern garages are also located behind the house and do not detract from the historic appearance of the neighborhood. In general, the garages are front gable structures that were built to house one car. Most of the houses are modest in scale, which reflects their construction during the Great Depression, but there are a few examples of the high-style.
