= Museo Pedro Coronel =

Mexican art museum in Zacatecas, Mexico

Coordinates: 22.7763°N 102.5737°W

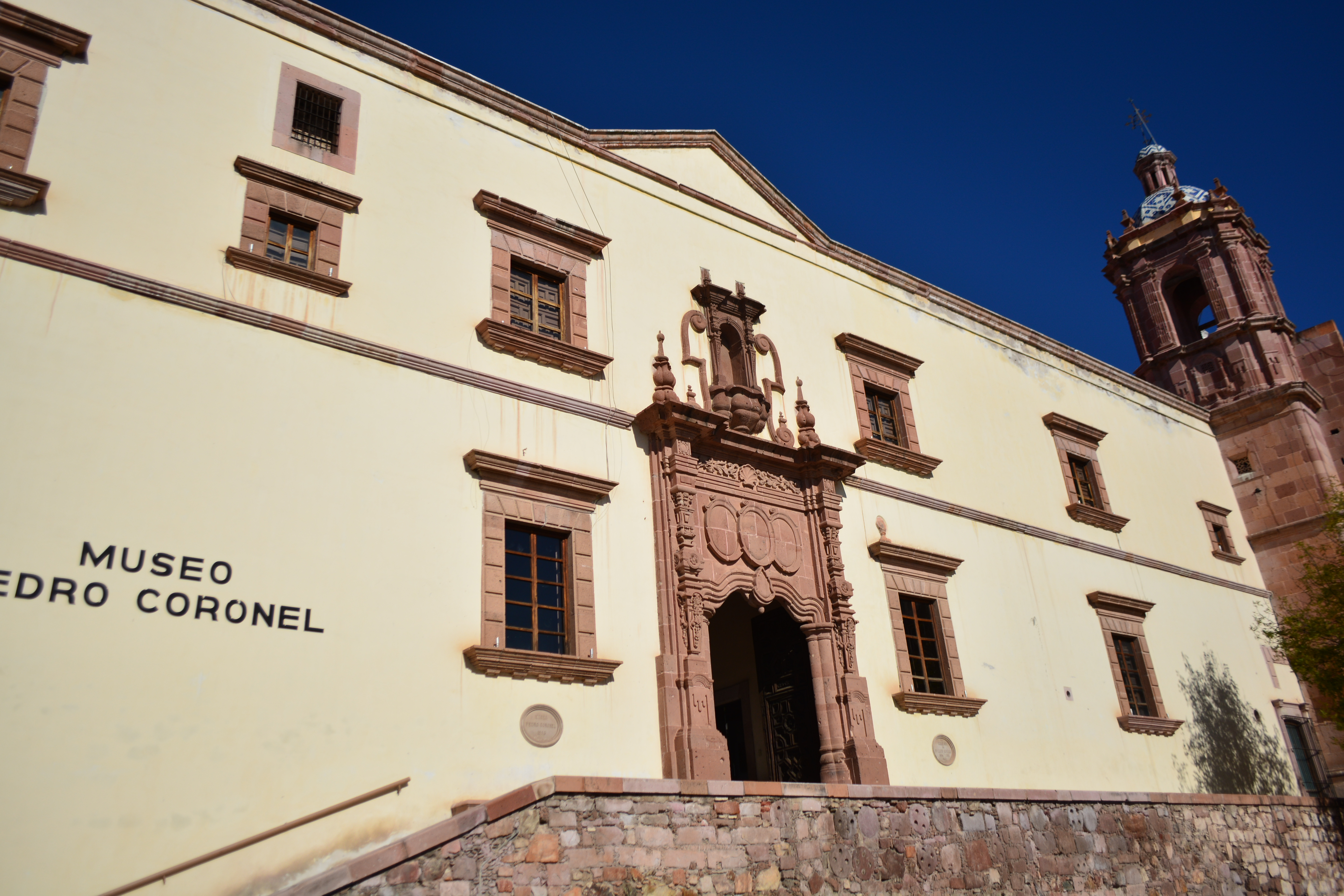
Façade of the Museo Pedro Coronel

The Museo Pedro Coronel (in Spanish: Pedro Coronel Museum) is a Mexican art museum situated in the city of Zacatecas. It was founded in 1983 and is devoted to the exhibition of the collection donated by the Zacatecan painter that comprises art of distinct periods and countries.

== History ==
The museum is located in the former Colegio de la Purísima Concepción or Colegio Grande founded by the jesuitas in the 17th century. Around the middle of the 18th century was remodelled, and after 1776 Expulsion of the Jesuits was given to the dominicos. In the 19th century, it was used as a hospital, barracks and prison, uses that continued until the 1960s. In 1974, restoration was begun was performed works of rescue and restoration in the building with aims to allocate it to cultural activities. In 1983 the painter Pedro Coronel donated his artistic collection and accepted that it was exhibited to the public in this venue, opened with his current name on 8 May 1983.

== Collection ==
- Art pieces of Greece, China, Japan, Italy and countries in Africa and Oceania
- Art pieces of authors like Chagall, Dalí, Picasso and Vasarely
- Historical Library "Elías Amador", with 20 000 volumes

== See also ==
- List of Jesuit sites
