= Sylvia Ashby =

Australian market researcher and founder of the Ashby Research Service

- Born: Sylvia Rose Ashby; 8 June 1908; New Sawley, Derbyshire, England
- Died: 9 September 1978 (aged 70); Palm Beach, New South Wales, Australia
- Education: Zerko Business College
- Occupation: Market researcher
- Spouse: John Stuart Lucy
- Children: 2

Sylvia Rose Ashby (8 June 1908 – 9 September 1978) was a British-born Australian market researcher and founder of the Ashby Research Service. A pioneer in the field, she was the first female market researcher in Australia and the United Kingdom, and the first person to conduct an Australia-wide public opinion poll. Mentored by two of the finest market researchers of the day, she used her experience to great effect and steadily grew her business.

During the Second World War her company experienced hardships due to a public that was suspicious of inquisitive representatives who would poll public sentiment about the war and the prime minister; in addition there was a reluctance among companies to spend money on market research, which they felt was unnecessary in a time of rationing. Nevertheless, she came to the attention of Sir Keith Murdoch, who offered her the opportunity to set up Australia's first public-opinion research subsidiary. When Sir Frank Packer made a counter-offer she accepted, and made Ashby Research Services a subsidiary of Australian Consolidated Press.

Ashby employed mainly women to survey housewives, who she considered to have great purchasing power, despite her view that most housewives were timid and shy creatures beholden to their husbands. After the war she continued innovative research, establishing the Ashby Consumer Panel, in which households maintained regular diaries that enabled her to gather continuous market research data. Toward the end of her life, Sir Frank Packer sold her back her company for the same price as he purchased it, before ailing health caused Ashby to sell her company to Beacon Research.

== Early life and career ==
Ashby was born on 8 June 1908 at New Sawley in Derbyshire, England to married couple Bertha Ashby (née Powell) and Walter Bertrand Ashby, who was a brickmaker. She was their fourth child; her siblings included Bertha Joan Prior and William Bertrand Ashby. The family migrated to Hawthorn in Melbourne when Ashby was five, and she was educated in Auburn, Hawthorn, and Camberwell state schools.

In 1923 Ashby started two years of training at a business college run by Frederick Zerko, after which she took up a secretarial job at J. Walter Thompson Australia Pty Ltd (colloquially known as JWT). The company downsized considerably when it lost the General Motors account, due to the Great Depression, and Ashby was relocated to the Sydney office. There she worked in the market research and psychology departments under Rudolph Simmat, and by 1933 was William McNair's assistant. Both Simmat and McNair gave her valuable experience and mentoring in market research; Simmat had authored one of the first studies into Australian market research, and McNair later formed the McNair Survey, a company that undertook major television and radio audience ratings surveys. In 1933 she resigned and moved to London, where she worked first for the London Press Exchange, and then for the Charles W. Hobson agency. Though the Australian Dictionary of Biography notes that "she spent much time reorganizing his library", Ashby found the contacts invaluable and the experience highly rewarding—particularly in that it taught her "to be always on the look-out for ideas for campaigns". While in London she attended conferences and seminars in Europe and North America. During this time she also worked with the German Ministry for Propaganda, conducting research into how to improve relations between Britain and Germany, though when it was leaked to the public, sentiment was such that she immediately withdrew from that program.

== Formation of the Ashby Research Service ==
Ashby returned to Sydney in 1936 and started her own business, the Ashby Research Service. Although she almost immediately secured a contract with an advertising agency to conduct a three-month-long survey of Melbourne's leading evening newspaper The Argus, it was nevertheless a difficult start. She later recounted that her initial problems were partly caused by "business executives [who] appeared to know little and to care even less" about market research; this was compounded by prevailing societal views of women, which were not positive toward women who ran their own business. Yet Ashby became a tireless promoter of market research in a market that did not yet see the value of such research, let alone paying for it. In a profile for The Sydney Morning Herald she was described as "perhaps the only woman in Australia who has specialised in market research". Ashby herself later declared that she was the only woman in the British Empire conducting an independent market research bureau. She persevered against the challenges, and within five years her clients included the Australian Gas Light Company, Pick-me-up Condiment Co. Ltd, the National Bank of Australasia, Dunlop-Perdriau rubber goods, Bushells, the Australian Women's Weekly and a number of advertising agencies.

Ashby's method was to employ mainly women, who she believed were more conscientious and effective investigators than men. In particular she found female investigators "much more patient with other women", and that "women will talk to another woman more freely". She preferred unmarried women, as she believed that "a single woman is better able to concentrate solely upon the problem on hand [and] has no home worries to distract her [and] has more time to keep herself physically fit". Ashby essentially believed that unmarried women had "a singleness of purpose denied to the married woman". She found focused interviews directly with housewives the most effective approach to market research. In a later interview with Australian Women's Weekly, she showed two small wooden, jointed mannequins as an example of how she expected her representatives to conduct themselves. One mannequin showed "Mrs. Right" and the other "Mrs. Wrong". Mrs. Right, she explained, "is erect, relaxed; the left arm (holding her bag and papers) is slightly to the rear; the right arm is forward; the head is slightly tilted—she is the epitome of confidence." Mrs. Wrong "is a bundle of nerves; head downcast, bag clutched to her—the epitome of apologetic timidity." Those who displayed a lack of appropriate deportment, she maintained, would cause suspicion and sometimes hostility, and the interviewee would be unresponsive to questioning, leading to poor survey results.

== Second World War ==
By 1939 Britain had declared war on Germany. The Second World War caused major issues for a marketing research company that undertook direct interviews—quite a few of Ashby's researchers were reported by citizens suspicious of those asking questions during a time of war, and consequently they were detained by police. At one point Ashby herself was vigorously questioned over several hours by the police, who accused her of "disloyalty" and threatened her with arrest if she did not stop surveying popular opinion on the war and the Prime Minister. Despite this, she largely ignored the threats of the authorities and continued to conduct surveys on topics such as conscription, the war effort and war psychology. At the same time, rationing meant that firms were less concerned with marketing efforts as the availability of goods became more scarce and consumers were more likely to buy what they could find.

Ashby hired John Stuart Lucy, a journalist from New Zealand, to help with her business. She later married him in 1939. Lucy was to later form a rival research firm, but this did not seem to cause any problems in the marriage—Ashby told The Argus that "we're rivals only in business. My husband completely approves of my career." She gave birth to a daughter, Susan, in 1940 and a son, Richard, in 1943. Despite her previously expressed views on the capabilities of married women at work, the Australian Dictionary of Biography notes that "busy and ambitious as she was, Sylvia did not neglect her two children. On weekends her time was devoted to them; school holidays were enjoyed together, sometimes at 'the farm', her husband's property at Narrabeen. At home there was always a maid or housekeeper; Susan was sent to Frensham and Richard to Geelong Church of England Grammar School."

Her wartime polling gained the attention of Sir Keith Murdoch, who not only ran the Herald & Weekly Times but was also briefly Director-General of Information for the Australian government in 1940. Murdoch commissioned Ashby to run research into the war effort, and Ashby ran the first Australia-wide public opinion survey. Murdoch later invited her to join him in establishing a public opinion subsidiary. Sir Frank Packer, rival proprietor of Australian Consolidated Press (ACP), got wind of the offer however, and put in a counter offer to make the Ashby Research Service a subsidiary of ACP. As Ashby had done work for the Australian Women's Weekly before the war, she chose to accept Packer's offer over Murdoch's. Murdoch then approached Roy Morgan to conduct opinion polling, and he organised the Australian Gallup Poll. From 1942 to 1944 the Ashby Research Service was renamed to the Daily Telegraph Research Bureau, but was renamed back to the Ashby Research Service after the war ended.

Writing for The Daily Telegraph in July 1942, in her capacity as Director of the Daily Telegraph Research Bureau, Ashby wrote an opinion piece proposing that the nation combine every two electorates and then subdivide them again into two electorates, to which women would elect a woman in one electorate, and men would elect a man in the second electorate. She felt this was necessary because "some of those who aspire to leadership unfortunately appear to have the habit of drawing upon themselves most unfavourable publicity, which distresses the average woman, who at heart (although her husband never guesses it) is a timid and shy creature, full of complexes, which cause her to withdraw into herself at the slightest sign of any thing in the nature of a public brawl." By allowing each citizen to only vote for their own gender, Ashby believed this would encourage a better class of female candidate and women would become more politically engaged.

== Post-war ==
After the Second World War ended, the Ashby Research Service saw a resurgence in business: surveys in 1945 included 14 for clients and 30 for ACP; in 1946 the number of surveys rose significantly, to 30 and 42 respectively. But the war had shown Ashby that revenue could be affected by external events; so she decided to conduct ongoing research surveys alongside her commissioned research to build up her existing data and attract new work. To this end, in 1945 she established the Ashby Consumer Panel as a trial in NSW and rolled out Australia-wide in 1947. The panel directly polled households through diaries of their buying habits. Householders would return from shopping and record their purchases and observations directly into an Ashby Consumer Purchase Record. By 1964 the Ashby Research Service boasted in an advertisement that 6165 households (containing 18,192 individuals) were keeping day-to-day records for the Service. To maintain quality, 237 regular employees inspected the logs, which were then sampled for checking by supervisors. The advertisement claimed that it was "the largest survey-group permanently employed in the South Hemisphere". Households were not paid, but received a subscription to The Women's Weekly.

Because it was important to maintain credibility and relevance, the Ashby Research Service maintained a statistical library, managed by their professional statisticians. Australia's post-war relaxation of immigration policies encouraged workers from Europe to emigrate to Australia, so Ashby's service employed workers who spoke a variety of European languages to ensure the consistency and accuracy of their data. In light of this influx and the more general post-war population boom, she also regularly requested new equipment from Packer, including an electric calculator and a punching machine.

Between September and November 1953 Ashby undertook an overseas business trip to the UK and the US. This caused ructions with the notoriously tight-fisted Packer, who did not necessarily believe in the benefits of such a journey. In a letter to Packer in June 1953, she argued forcefully for the trip, writing:

Mr Packer ... it is essential that we keep up with movements in the technique of Market Research, and it is also essential for our prestige that I go overseas. The twelve years in your employ is a long time to ‘stay put’ ... and when other Research people are constantly coming and going ... After ten years of most profitable operation, through lack of co-operation from Consolidated Press, the Ashby Research Service latterly has been hindered from progressing ... . Periodical overseas visits are essential to a Director of Market Research and this was discussed prior to the signing of my initial contract.

Her travels impressed on her that her work was first class and ahead of the rest of the world. The Argus reported that during her 1953 overseas trip "she tried to find a woman counterpart, 'But without success, I'm afraid. It seems I'm quite unique'." On a 1958 business trip she was unimpressed with the work of Johnson & Johnson's consumer panels and noted that Alfred Politz Research Inc.—a leading market research company based in Manhattan—did not conduct audits and "do not provide anything resembling a standardised service".

As the success of the Ashby Research Service grew, so too did their competition. Profits decreased between 1965 and 1966, and in 1968 the firm recorded a loss. This caused ACP to demand a full audit; but Ashby put together a strident defence, pointing out that it was the only time in the subsidiary's history that their expenditure exceeded their revenue. She referred to a particularly problematic client and the costs of using a computer. To her frustration, Ashby found that her subsidiary was being underused by ACP, and regularly wrote to Packer to suggest ways of using her services.

== Australian Research Service buy-back and death ==
In 1974, both Packer and Ashby were looking to retire. In a magnanimous gesture to Ashby, Packer sold the Ashby Research Service back to her for the same amount that he had paid for it in 1941—$2,800. Ashby, who was by this time becoming very ill, sold the business to Beacon Research Co. Pty Ltd. As her health continued to fail, she began using a wheelchair, before finally dying of cancer on 9 September 1978 at Palm Beach, New South Wales and was cremated.
