= Don B. Ray =

American television composer

- Born: Don Brandon Ray; June 7, 1925; Santa Maria, California, U.S.
- Died: April 16, 2005 (aged 79); Santa Monica, California, U.S.
- Education: University of California, Los Angeles; California State University, Long Beach
- Occupation: Television composer
- Website: donbrandonray.com

Don Brandon Ray (June 7, 1925 – April 16, 2005) was an American television composer.

== Education ==
Ray earned a B.A at the University of California, Los Angeles in 1948 and later an M.A. in music from California State University, Long Beach.

== Career ==
Ray worked for CBS for 30 years, composing music for television series including Hawaii Five-O, The Twilight Zone, Rawhide, The Governor & J.J. and Men at Law.

In 1974, Ray was nominated for a Primetime Emmy Award in the category “Best Music Composition - For a Series, a Single Program of a Series” for the Hawaii Five-O episode "Nightmare in Blue".

In 2000, Ray wrote the Orchestration Handbook.

== Death ==
Ray died in April 2005 of an infection at the Santa Monica University in Santa Monica, California, at the age of 79.
