= Le Testament de Villon =

Opera composed in 1923 by Ezra Pound

- by: Ezra Pound; George Antheil
- Language: middle French
- Based on: Le Testament by François Villon
- Premiere: 1926

Le Testament de Villon is an opera composed in 1923 by the American poet Ezra Pound, with assistance from George Antheil. It is based on Le Testament, a collection of poems written by François Villon in 1461.

Pound was an amateur composer. He was interested in early music in general, perhaps partly through his contact with Arnold Dolmetsch; he was particularly fond of the repertoire of the Provençal troubadours. He had written chapters on mediaeval song in his Spirit of Romance in 1910. In 1913 he had, with Walter Morse Rummel, published nine troubadour songs arranged for solo voice and piano; in 1920 he had collaborated with Agnes Bedford on Five Troubadour Songs, also for voice and piano. For his setting of Le Testament of Villon in 1923, he enlisted the help of George Antheil. The result has little in the way of instrumentation, harmony or dialogue, but is characterised by detailed and complex rhythmic notation designed to reproduce the rhythms of the text.

The first performance was given in 1926. In July 1965 it was performed as a ballet under the direction Gian-Carlo Menotti at the Teatro Caio Melisso of Spoleto, in Umbria in central Italy, as part of the Festival dei Due Mondi; the first performance in the United States was conducted by Robert Hughes at the Zellerbach Auditorium of the University of California at Berkeley in 1971; and the first British public performance took place in Cambridge in 1985. In 1973 the opera was performed in Germany at the Hamburgische Staatsoper under Friedrich Götz and with additional music by Hans Ludwig Hirsch. The work was recorded by Hughes and the Western Opera Theatre of the San Francisco Opera in 1972.
