= Robert Richenburg =

Artist and sculptor (1917–2006)

Robert Richenburg (July 14, 1917 – October 10, 2006 in East Hampton, New York) was an abstract expressionist artist based in New York City, whose paintings were widely acclaimed in the 1950s and 1960s. While a student of Hans Hofmann, Richenburg exhibited at the Museum of Non-Objective Painting (later the Guggenheim) in 1950. The following year, he participated in the historic Ninth Street Art Exhibition, and subsequently taught at Pratt Institute along with Franz Kline, Adolph Gottlieb, Jack Tworkov, Philip Guston, Milton Resnick and Tony Smith. By 1961, critic Irving Sandler declared that "Richenburg emerges as one of the most forceful painters on the New York Art Scene." The Whitney Museum, the Museum of Modern Art and the Philadelphia Museum of Art, among others, purchased his work.

== Career ==
Richenburg's work as a painter followed training in his teens at the Boston Museum of Fine Arts, art history studies at George Washington University (without graduating), courses at the Corcoran School of Art in Washington, D.C. and at the Art Students' League in New York, and service in World War II as a combat engineer dealing with explosives, mines and booby traps. Within five years of his return to the States, Richenburg had studied with Amédée Ozenfant and Hans Hofmann, lived for a year in Provincetown, Massachusetts—where he then began spending summers—joined the Artists' Club in New York, and exhibited at the Museum of Non-Objective Painting and the Provincetown Art Association. In 1951 he began a long-term teaching position at the Pratt Institute, and Leo Castelli selected one of his works for the historic Ninth Street Show. Thus began a career in which Richenburg's paintings were widely exhibited and reviewed, and purchased by major collectors (Walter Chrysler, Joseph Hirshhorn) and museums (the Whitney Museum of American Art, the Museum of Modern Art).

Richenburg's most distinctive achievement was the body of work that art historian Bonnie Grad called the "Black" paintings, created between 1958 and 1964, when he pursued "the dynamic tension and energy generated by the contrast and interplay between color and blackness." These paintings, often grand in size, attracted favorable reviews not only from Sandler, but also from such critics as Dore Ashton and Fairfield Porter, and author James A. Michener. Porter wrote, "...Richenburg's painting...seems to be specifically about energy," while Ashton responded to the huge abstract canvases by observing that "His image of a pitch-black place cut through by flickering neon light is persistently urban and nocturnal." A sense of mystery arises in many of these layered paintings, which prompted poet Marianne Moore to suggest to Richenburg on a visit to his studio that one large work in particular suggested to her countless "secret boxes, opening up each a little world of its own."

Although Richenburg's career faltered with the advent of Pop Art and his relocation to Ithaca, New York (where he taught at Cornell University), it was a fortuitous visit in 1986 by Grad to Richenburg's studio in the Springs on Long Island, where he lived with his second wife, artist Margaret Kerr, that led to new appreciation of his art. Grad's exhibitions, mounted at the Rose Art Museum at Brandeis University in 1993 and the next year at the Pollock-Krasner House and Study Center in East Hampton and the University Art Gallery at the State University of New York at Stony Brook (Stony Brook University), put the artist back in the spotlight. Articles about Richenburg's life story and his work appeared in the Boston Globe, the Boston Herald, Newsday and the New York Times, among other publications.

== Bibliography ==
- Grad, Bonnie L., Robert Richenburg: Abstract Expressionist. Exhibition Catalog for the Rose Art Museum. Brandeis University, 1993. OCLC 47712937
- Landau, Ellen G., "Robert Richenburg: What Lies Beneath," in Robert Richenburg. David Findlay Jr., Gallery, 2004. OCLC 68181051
- Long, Robert, Robert Richenburg: The Richard Zahn Collection. Sidney Mishkin Gallery, 2006. ISBN 9780977757138 OCLC 76046757
- Robert Richenburg: Works on Paper from the 1940s. David Findlay Jr., Inc., 2005 OCLC 71224786
- Robert Richenburg Abstract Expressionism 1950s-New York School
- Sandler, Irving H., "New York Letter," Art International, vol. 3, April 1961.
- Dantzic, Cynthia Maris (2006). 100 New York painters. Atglen, Pa.: Schiffer. ISBN 9780764325434.
- Herskovic, Marika (2003). American abstract expressionism of the 1950s : an illustrated survey with artists' statements, artwork, and biographies. Franklin Lakes, NJ: New York School Press. ISBN 0967799414.
- Kennedy, Randy (13 October 2006). "Robert Richenburg, 89, Artist of Abstract Expressionist Works, Dies". New York Times.
- Robert Zaller, Robert Richenburg. "EI" Magazine of European Art Center (EUARCE) of Greece, 12st issue 1995 p. 12-12 (and translation in Greek language: Lily Bita, p. 40–42)
