= Ilse Getz =

German-American artist (1917–1992)

- Born: Ilse Bechhold; 24 October 1917; Nuremberg, Germany
- Died: 4 December 1992 (aged 75); Litchfield, Connecticut
- Known for: painting, collage
- Spouses: David Getz; Manoucher Yektai; Gibson Danes

Ilse Getz (born Ilse Bechhold; 24 October 1917 – 4 December 1992) was a German-born American painter and collagist active in New York and Newtown, Connecticut, from the 1950s through the 1980s. She specialized on three-dimensional works, made mostly with found objects. She exhibited at several galleries in New York City including the Bertha Schaefer Gallery and Rosenberg Gallery, as well as in Europe, namely in Switzerland, Germany, France and United Kingdom.

== Life ==
Ilse Bechhold was born in Nuremberg, Germany, on 24 October 1917 in a family of Abraham Bechhold and Pauline Mann. When her father committed suicide in 1929, she was sent to Hamburg to live with her sister. In 1933, she and her sister left Germany, traveling to Italy, Spain, Cuba and Mexico. Bechhold then joined immediate family in New York. In 1937 she married lawyer David Getz and settled in Allentown, Pennsylvania. Three years later she gave birth to a child and became naturalized citizen of the United States. In 1942 Getz visited her sister in Mexico. In 1943, upon returning to New York, she attended Art Students League, studying with George Grosz and Morris Kantor.

In 1945 Getz worked as freelance artist and already had her first exhibition at the Norlyst Gallery in New York. During 1947–1948, she traveled and worked in Europe, visiting Switzerland, France, Spain and Portugal, and Brazil. From 1954 to 1959 Getz worked in various art galleries in New York. In summer 1956 and 1958 she taught and exhibited at the Positano Art Workshop in Italy along with Piero Dorazio. In 1958 Getz married her second husband, artist Manoucher Yektai.

The following year she received Yaddo foundation fellowship to the artists’ community. In 1960 Getz designed backdrop for Eugene Ionesco’s play “The Killer” in New York. The next two years she spent in Paris where she was represented by Iris Clert Gallery. In 1962, Getz returned to New York City and maintained studio on the Upper East Side. In summers 1962, 1963 and 1965 she painted on Mykonos in Greece.

Getz married in 1964 to Gibson Danes, Dean of Yale School of Art and Architecture. It was the third marriage for both of them. The couple lived in New York and Connecticut, and eventually settled in Newtown, Connecticut. Later in life, Getz suffered from advanced Alzheimer’s disease and Danes feared that he would no longer be able to properly care for his wife.

On 4 December 1992 Getz and Danes died of carbon monoxide poisoning the garage of their home in Litchfield, Connecticut. They were 75 and 81, respectively. As police said, Getz was apparently killed by her husband who committed suicide. Getz is survived by a daughter, Patricia Getz-Preziosi.

== Art and career ==
In 1942 Getz created her first oil painting while visiting her sister in Mexico and by 1945 she had her first exhibition at the Norlyst Gallery in New York. As a result of solo shows in New York at the Bertha Schaefer Gallery (1957-1958), Stephen Radich Gallery (1960), and inclusion in numerous important group exhibitions, Getz enjoyed a secure reputation as painter, when, in 1959, she included the assemblage, or collage construction, to the scope of her work.

Her collages and constructions incorporated game boards, playing cards, birds, dolls and musical instruments. Some of her three-dimensional works were exhibited at the Museum of Fine Arts in Phoenix, Arizona, the Neuberger Museum in Purchase and the Alex Rosenberg Gallery in Manhattan. Retrospective exhibitions of Getz’s work were also held at the Kunsthalle Nürnberg in 1978 and at the Goethe House, New York in 1980.

Recently her works were included in group exhibitions at Neuberger Museum of Art, Purchase College (2008-2009), Pavel Zoubok Art Gallery, New York (2014, 2016) and Invisible-Exports, East, New York (2016). Her works are in the collections of Hirshhorn Museum and Sculpture Garden in Washington, Hood Museum of Art, Dartmouth College, Philadelphia Museum of Art, New-York Historical Society Museum & Library, Hopkings Center at Dartmouth College, the Kunsthalle, Nuremberg, and the Tel Aviv Museum in Israel among others.

Getz’s work has been offered at auction multiple times, with the record price $134 USD for “Timeless Game”, sold at James Adams & Sons in 2007.

== Exhibitions ==
=== Individual shows ===
- Norlyst Gallery, New York (1945)
- Galleria Casa Serocline, Ascona, Switzerland (1947)
- Bertha Schaefer Gallery, New York (1957–58)
- Stephen Radich Gallery, New York (1960)
- Iris Clert Gallery, Paris (1961)
- Tibor de Nagy Gallery, New York (1963)
- Rigelhapt Gallery, Boston (1966)
- Allentown Art Museum (1973)
- Gimpel and Witzenhoffer Gallery, New York (1978)
- Neuberger Museum of Art, Purchase (1978)
- Kunsthalle, Nuremberg (1978)
- Goethe House, New York (1980)

=== Group shows ===
- Gloucester Art Society, Massachusetts (1944)
- Museum of Modern Art, New York (1957)
- Baltimore Museum, Maryland (1957)
- Stephen Radich Gallery, New York (1959)
- Galerie La Roue, Paris (1960)
- American Embassy, London (1963)
- Musee d’Arts Decoratif, Paris (1965)
- Philadelphia Museum of Art, Pennsylvania (1974)

== Collections ==
- Carnegie Institute, Pittsburgh, Pennsylvania
- Tel Aviv Museum, Tel Aviv
- Allentown Art Museum, Pennsylvania
- Hirshhorn Museum, Washington, D.C.
- Kunsthalle, Nuremberg

== Books ==
- Ilse Getz : keywest winters, newtown summers : recent work, April 29 - May 28, 1982, New York : Alex Rosenberg Gallery, 1982.
