= Carl Ashby =

American painter

- Born: 1914; Hurley, New Mexico, U.S.
- Died: 2014 (aged 99–100); New York City, U.S.
- Education: University of Utah; New York University
- Known for: Painting; Art dealer
- Movement: Abstract expressionism

Carl Ashby (1914 — 2004) was an American abstract expressionist artist who lived and worked in New York City.

== Biography ==
Ashby was born in Hurley, New Mexico on March 2, 1914. He worked as an artist for the Civilian Conservation Corps before attending the University of Utah, where he graduated with a degree in Fine Arts in 1937.

He relocated to New York City shortly thereafter, and married artist Estelle Grey in 1938. Grey had moved to New York City as a young woman to pursue a career in fashion design and she attend the Traphagen School of Fashion. The couple met as students in the Art Student League of New York. Ashby earned a Master in Arts degree from New York University in 1959. During his career, Ashby studied with artists Hans Hofmann, George Grosz, and Morris Kantor.

He taught at the Parsons Division of the New School for 25 years, beginning in 1970.

His works and papers are included in the permanent collections of the Smithsonian Archives of American Art, the Provincetown Art Association and Museum, Whitney Museum of American Art, and the Hood Museum at Dartmouth College.
