= Musée National d'Art Moderne =

Art museum in Paris, France

- Centre Georges-Pompidou from Notre-Dame de Paris, 2011
- Established: 9 June 1947; 79 years ago
- Location: Centre Pompidou, place Georges Pompidou, 75004 Paris and Centre Pompidou-Metz, Human Rights square, 57000 Metz
- Type: Art museum
- Visitors: 1,501,040 (2021)
- Director: Xavier Ray
- Public transit access: Rambuteau, Hôtel de Ville
- Website: www.centrepompidou.fr

The Musée National d'Art Moderne (French pronunciation: [myze nɑsjɔnal daʁ mɔdɛʁn]; "National Museum of Modern Art") is the national museum for modern art of France. It is located in the 4th arrondissement of Paris and is housed in the Centre Pompidou. In 2021 it ranked 10th in the list of most visited art museums in the world, with 1,501,040 visitors. It is one of the largest museums for modern and contemporary art in the world.

== History ==
In 1937, the Musée National d'Art Moderne succeeded the Musée du Luxembourg, established in 1818 by King Louis XVIII as the first museum of contemporary art created in Europe, devoted to living artists whose work was due to join the Louvre 10 years after their death. Imagined as early as 1929 by Auguste Perret to replace the old Palais du Trocadero, the construction of a museum of modern art was officially decided in 1934 in the western wing of the Palais de Tokyo. Completed in 1937 for that year's International Exhibition of Arts and Technology, it was temporarily used for another purpose, since the exhibition of national and foreign art indépendant was then preferably held in the Petit Palais and the Musée du Jeu de Paume. Although due to open in 1939, construction was eventually interrupted by the war; following the nomination of its first Chief Conservator in September 1940, the museum partially opened in 1942 with only a third of the collection brought back from some national collection caches hidden in the province. But its real inauguration didn't take place until 1947, after World War II and the addition of the foreign schools collection of the Musée du Luxembourg, which had been held at the Musée du Jeu de Paume since 1922.

In 1947, then housed in the Palais de Tokyo, its collection was dramatically increased by its first director, Jean Cassou, thanks to his special relationship with many prominent artists or their families, such as Picasso and Braque.

With the creation of the Centre Pompidou, the museum moved to its current location in 1977.

== Description ==
The museum has the largest collection of modern and contemporary art in Europe, and second largest in the world, after the Museum of Modern Art in New York, with more than 100,000 works of art by 6,400 artists from 90 countries since Fauvism in 1905. These works include painting, sculpture, drawing, print, photography, cinema, new media, architecture, and design. A part of the collection is exhibited every two years alternately in an 18,500-square-metre (199,000 ft^{2}) space divided between two floors, one for modern art (from 1905 to 1960, on the 5th floor), the other for contemporary art (from 1960, on the 4th floor), and 5 exhibition halls, on a total of 28,000 m^{2} (300,000 ft^{2}) within the Centre Pompidou. The Atelier Brancusi is located in its own building adjacent to the museum.

The works displayed in the museum often change in order to show to the public the variety and depth of the collection. Many major temporary exhibitions of modern and contemporary art have taken place on a separate floor (the 6th) over the years, among them many one-person exhibitions. Since 2010, the museum has also displayed unique, temporary exhibitions in its provincial branch, the Centre Pompidou-Metz, in a 10,000-square-metre (110,000 ft^{2}) space divided between 3 galleries and since 2015, in Málaga, Spain, and 2018, in Brussels, Belgium.

== Collections ==
=== Modern art (1905–1960) ===
Many styles of modern art, including Fauvism, Expressionism, Cubism, Dada, Abstract art, Surrealism are represented with works by Matisse, André Derain, Maurice de Vlaminck, Raoul Dufy, Albert Marquet, Le Douanier Rousseau, Paul Signac, Georges Braque, Pablo Picasso, Jean Metzinger, Albert Gleizes, Fernand Léger, Juan Gris, Frida Kahlo, Ernst Ludwig Kirchner, August Macke, Alexej von Jawlensky, Emil Nolde, Oskar Kokoschka, Otto Dix, George Grosz, Kurt Schwitters, Marcel Duchamp, Francis Picabia, Carlo Carrà, Umberto Boccioni, Giacomo Balla, Gino Severini, Marc Chagall, Natalia Goncharova, Mikhail Larionov, Alexander Rodchenko, František Kupka, Piet Mondrian, Theo van Doesburg, Paul Klee, Wassily Kandinsky, Kasimir Malevich, Jacques Villon, Robert Delaunay, Sonia Delaunay, Georges Rouault, Balthus, Max Beckmann, Constantin Brâncuși, Alexander Calder, Chaïm Soutine, Amedeo Modigliani, Kees van Dongen, Jean Arp, Giorgio de Chirico, André Breton, Magritte, Max Ernst, Joan Miró, Man Ray, Alberto Giacometti, Salvador Dalí, Nicolas de Staël, André Masson, Yves Tanguy, Jean Tinguely, Simon Hantaï, Yves Klein, Jackson Pollock, Mark Rothko, Barnett Newman, Willem de Kooning, and Francis Bacon.

=== Contemporary art (art from 1960 on) ===
Pop Art, Nouveau Réalisme, Conceptual art and other tendencies or groups are represented with works by Andy Warhol, Richard Hamilton, Rauschenberg, Dan Flavin, Eduardo Arroyo, Dan Graham, Daniel Buren, George Brecht, Arman, César, Bill Viola, Anish Kapoor, Wim Delvoye, Yves Klein, Niki de Saint-Phalle, Yaacov Agam, Vasarely, John Cage, Cindy Sherman, Dieter Roth, Beuys, Roy Lichtenstein, Burhan Dogancay, Dubuffet, Nam June Paik, Wolf Vostell, Gilbert & George, David Hockney, Louise Bourgeois, and Art & Language.

Works of architecture and design include Philippe Starck, Jean Nouvel, and Dominique Perrault.

=== Nazi-looted art ===
In 1999, the heirs of Alphonse Kann requested the return of Georges Braque's The Guitar Player, which the Centre Pompidou had acquired from Heinz Berggruen in 1981. In 2011, Centre Pompidou admitted that it held three paintings, Les Peupliers (Poplars), Arbres (Trees), and Composition by the artist Fédor Löwenstein that had been looted during the Nazi occupation of France. In 2021, after the French government restituted a looted Max Pechtstein painting to the heirs of Hugo Simon, the Centre Pompidou held an exhibition as a tribute to the persecuted art collector.

== Directors ==
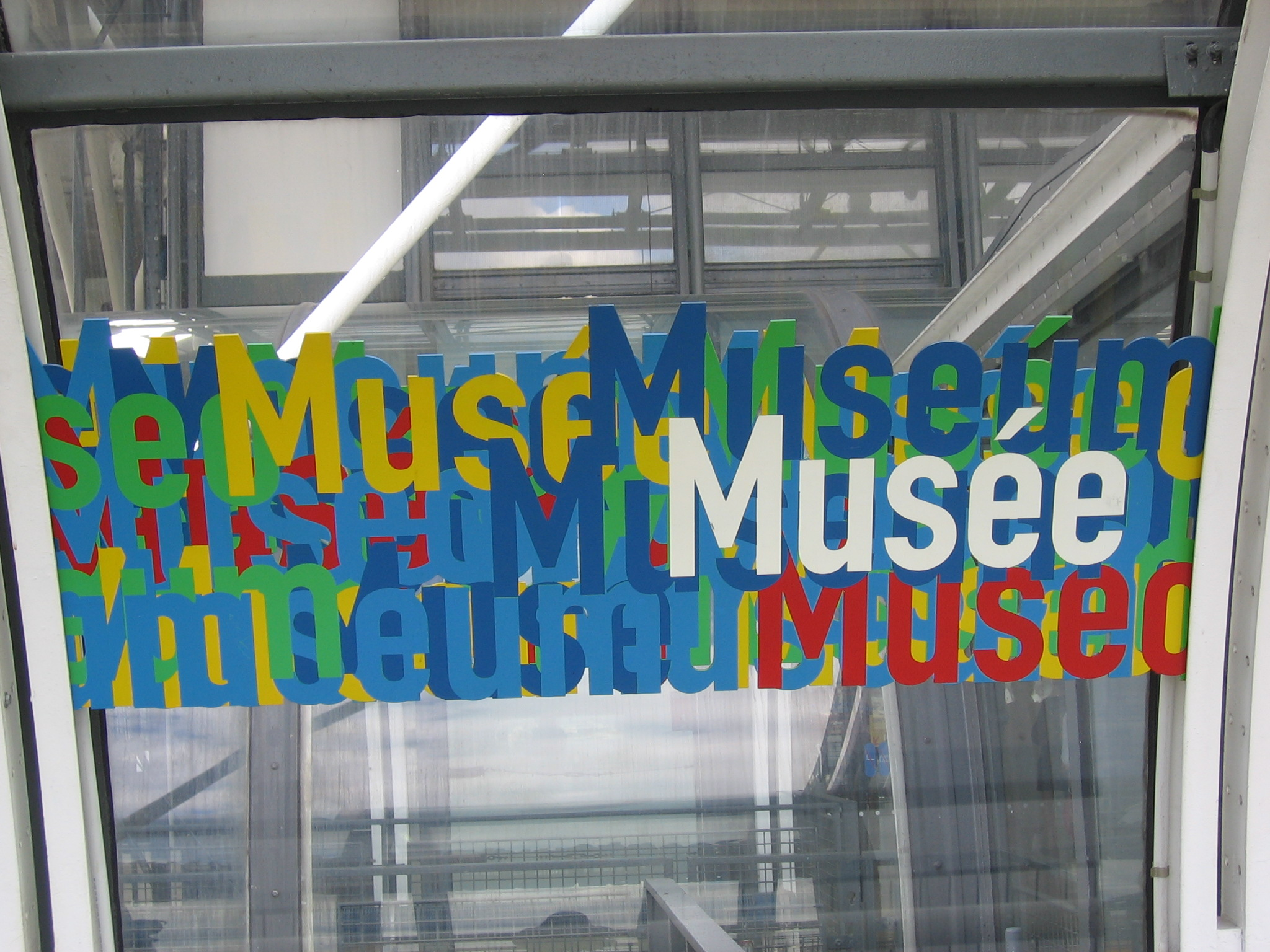

- 2021 – present: Xavier Rey
- 2013 – 2021 : Bernard Blistène
- 2000 – 2013 : Alfred Pacquement
- 1997 – 2000 : Werner Spies
- 1992 – 1997 : Germain Viatte
- 1991 – 1992 : Dominique Bozo
- 1987 – 1991 : Jean-Hubert Martin
- 1986 – 1987 : Bernard Ceysson
- 1981 – 1986 : Dominique Bozo
- 1973 – 1981 : Pontus Hultén
- 1968 – 1973 : Jean Leymarie
- 1965 – 1968 : Bernard Dorival
- 1945 – 1965 : Jean Cassou
- 1941 – 1944 : Pierre Ladoué
- 1940 : Jean Cassou

== Gallery ==
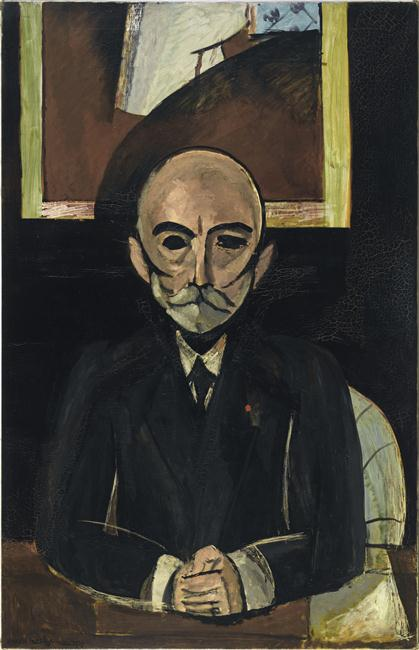
Henri Matisse, Auguste Pellerin II, 1916–17

Jean Metzinger, Etude pour Le goûter, 1911

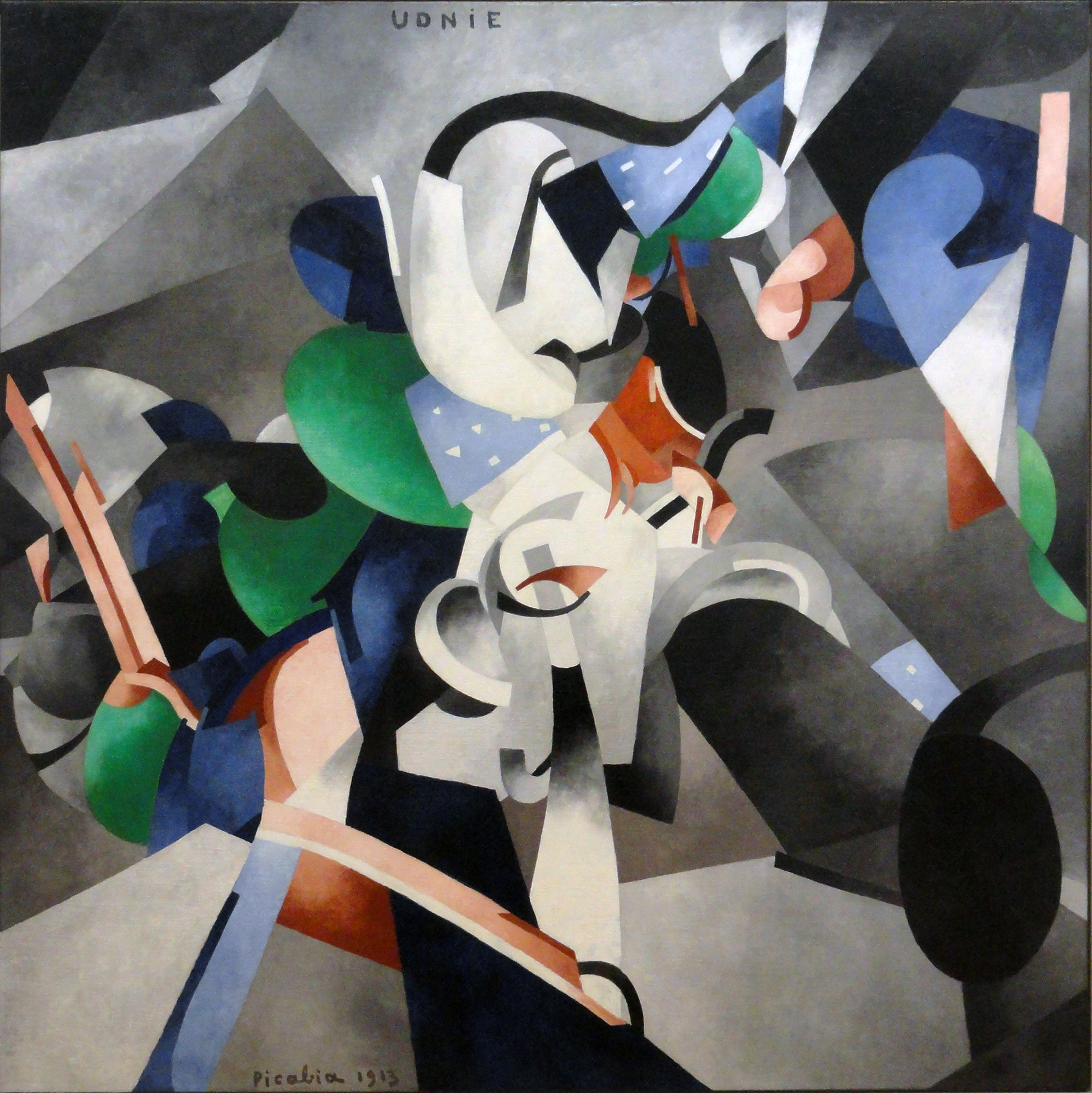
Francis Picabia, Udnie (Young American Girl, The Dance), 1913

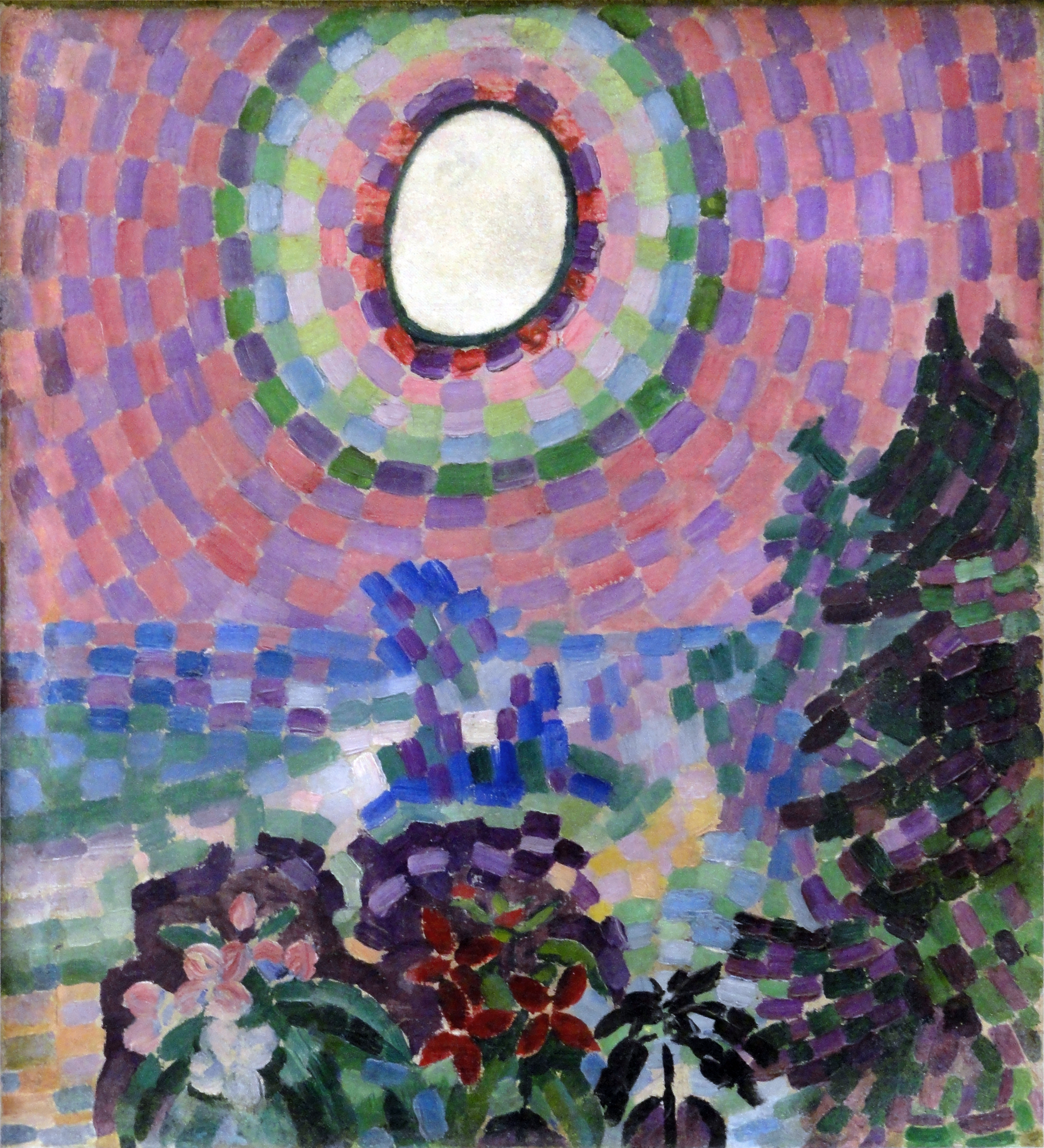
Robert Delaunay, Paysage au disque, 1906

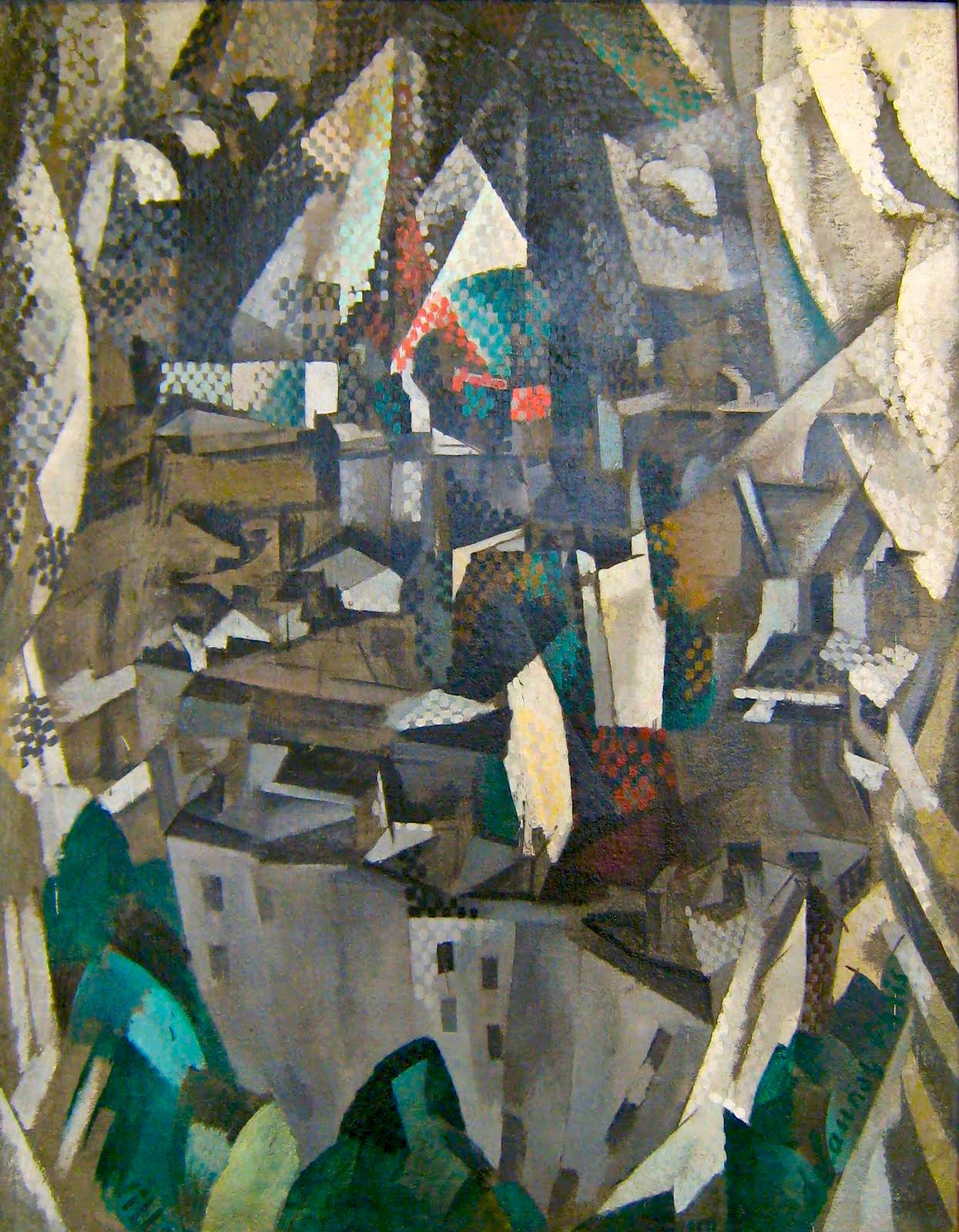
Robert Delaunay, La ville no. 2, 1910–11

Georges Braque, Nature morte (Fruit Dish, Ace of Clubs), 1913

Georges Braque, Man With a Guitar, 1914

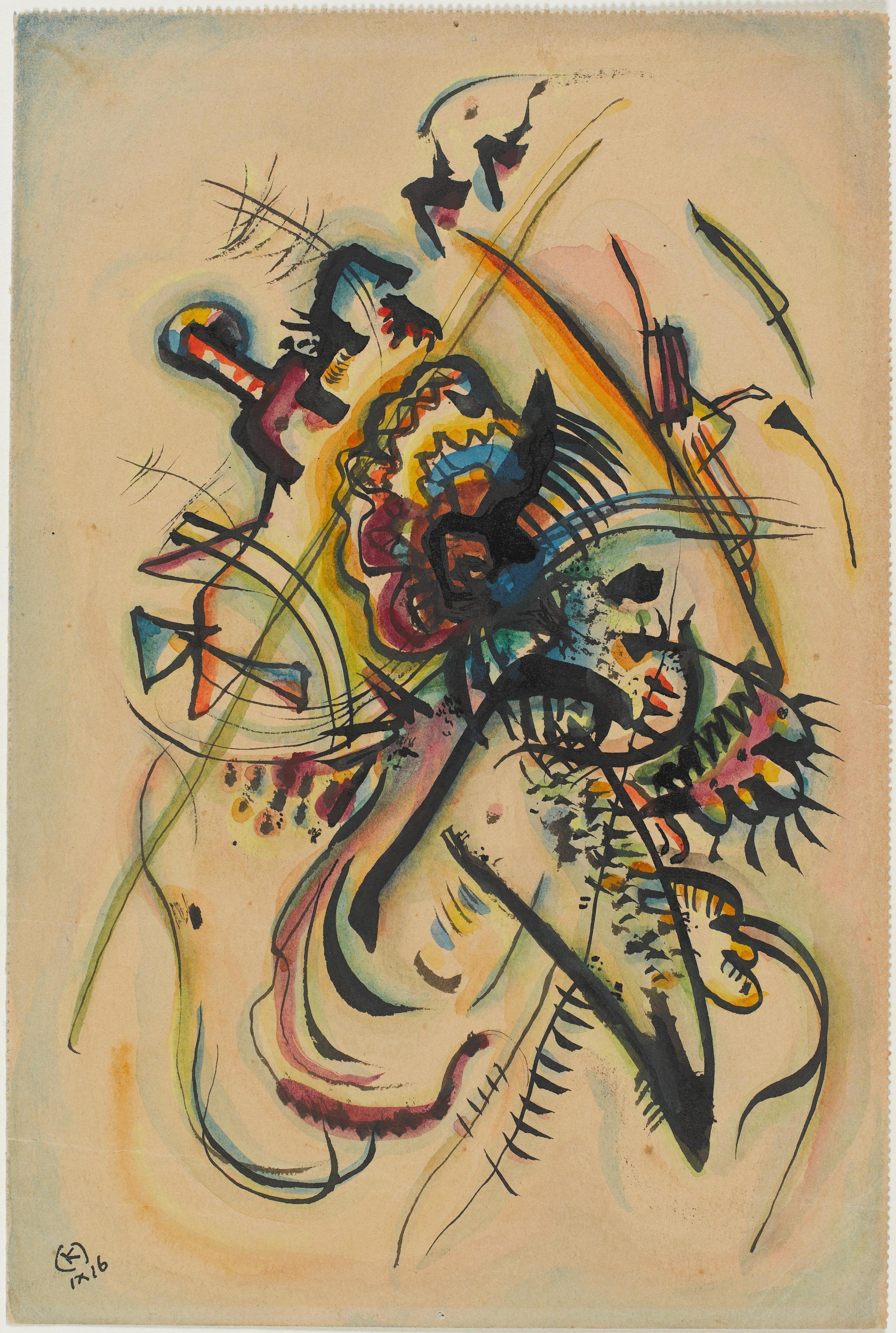
Wassily Kandinsky, To the Unknown Voice, 1916

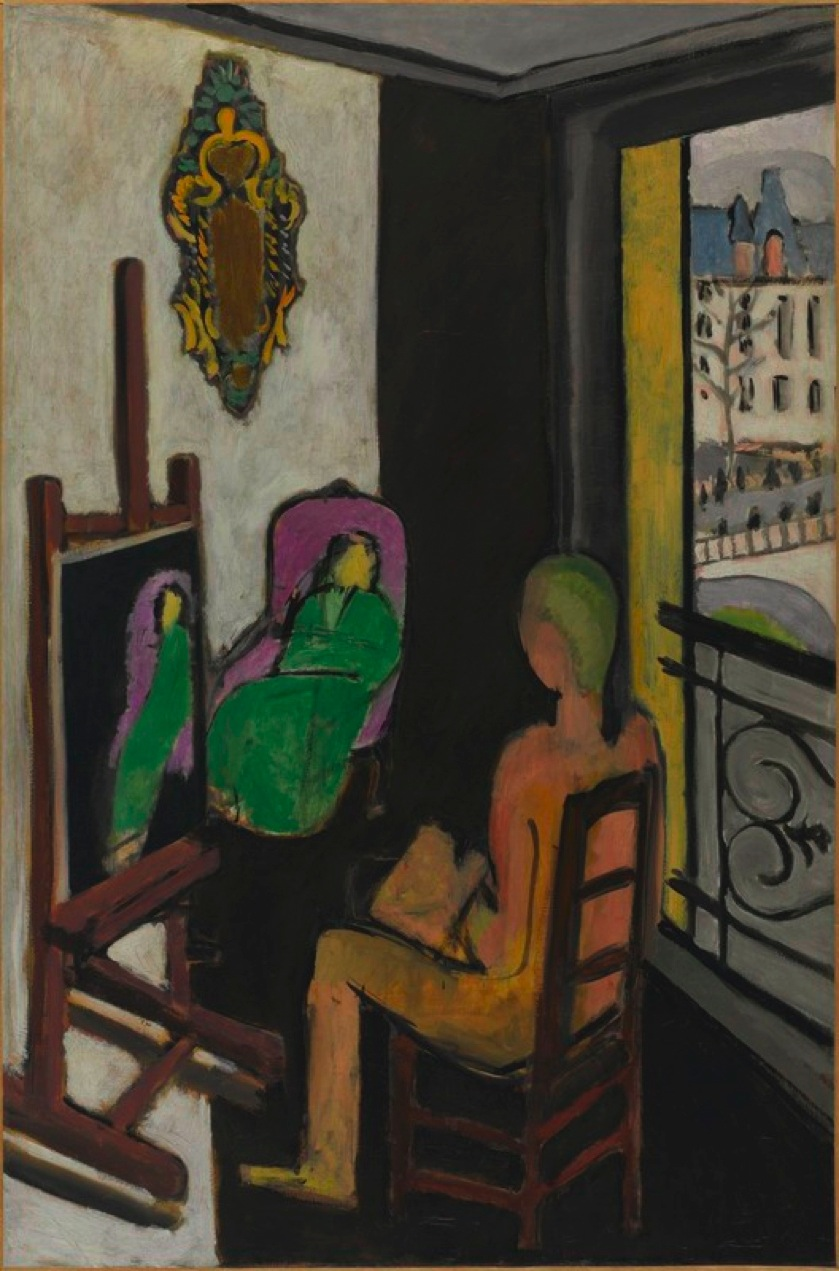
Henri Matisse, The Painter and His Model (Le Peintre dans son atelier), 1916–17

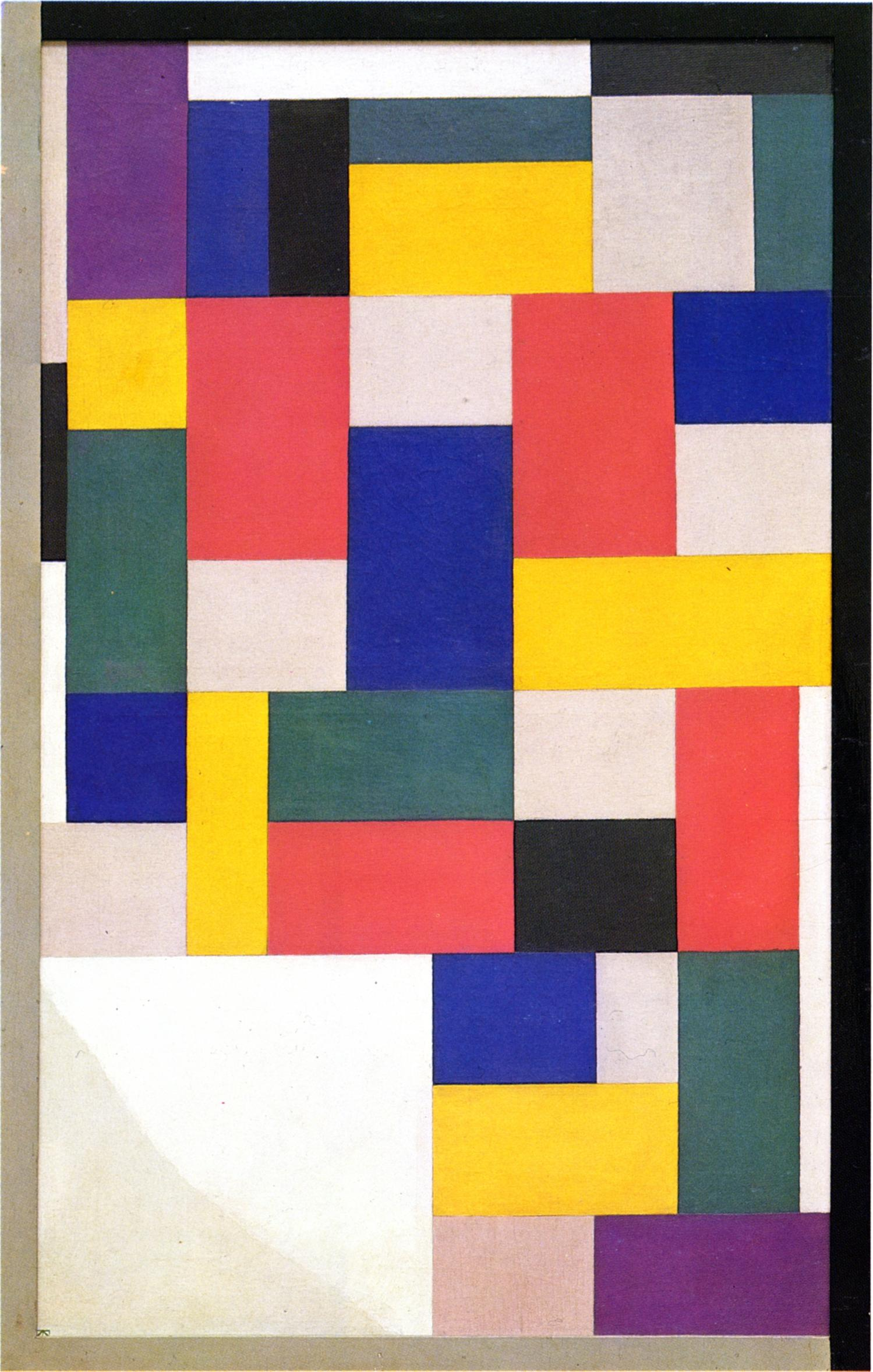
Theo van Doesburg, Pure Painting, 1920

Pablo Picasso, Parade, 1917, Centre Pompidou-Metz

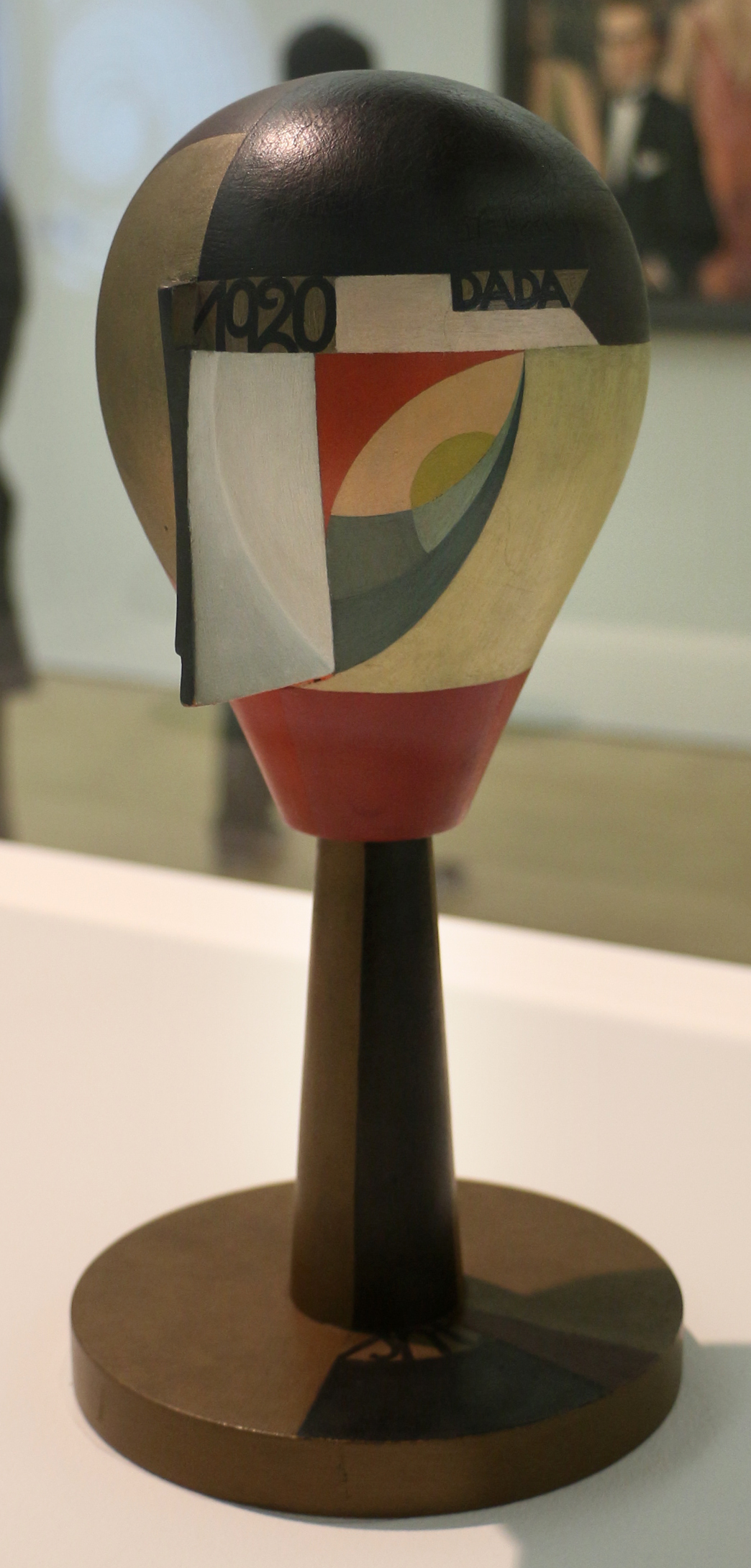
Sophie Taeuber-Arp, Tête Dada, 1920

== See also ==
- List of largest art museums
