= Tête Dada =

Artwork by Sophie Taeuber-Arp

- Dada Head
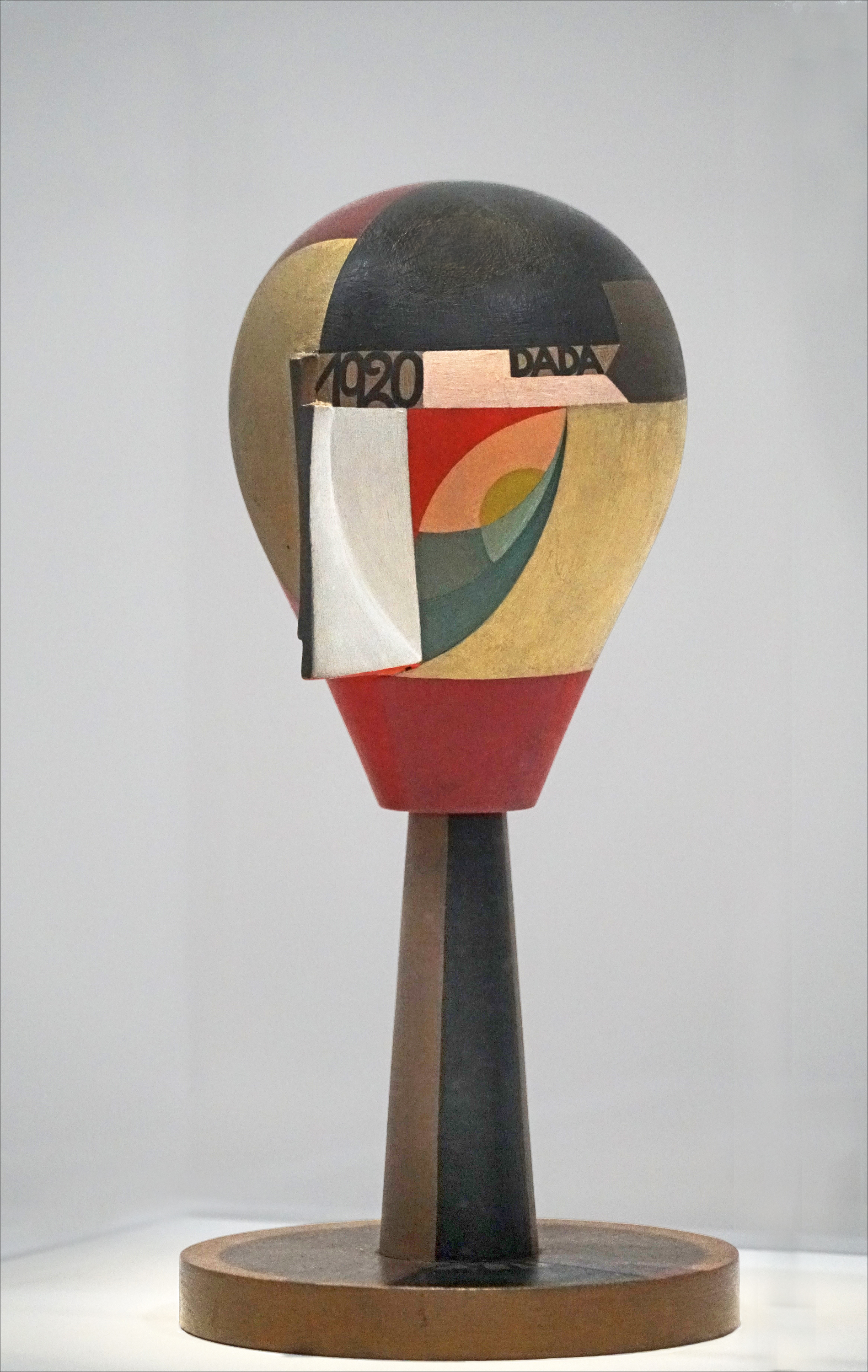
- Artist: Sophie Taeuber-Arp
- Year: 1920
- Medium: Wood sculpture
- Movement: Dada
- Subject: Abstract head
- Dimensions: 29,43 cm (1,159 in); 14 cm diameter (5.5 in)
- Location: Musée National d'Art Moderne, Paris, France
- Accession: 2003
- Preceded by: Dada Heads

Tête Dada (French for Dada Head) is a polychromed wooden sculpture created by Swiss artist Sophie Taeuber-Arp in 1920. It is one of the artist's most well-known contributions to the Zurich Dada movement and to early geometric abstraction in European 20th-century art. Created during the artist's involvement with Dada at the Cabaret Voltaire, the sculpture involves craft traditions, performance culture and abstraction. Since 2003, Tête Dada has been part of the collection of the Musée National d'Art Moderne at the Centre Pompidou in Paris, France. Major retrospectives, such as those at the Museum of Modern Art and Tate Modern, have established Taeuber-Arp as an important woman artist in early Modernism.

Scholars have written about its transformation of utilitarian craft forms into avant-garde sculpture, its role within Dada's challenge to artistic hierarchies and authorship and its importance in the development of Concrete and Abstract art in the 20th century. The work has been discussed in monographs, exhibition catalogues and journal articles on Taeuber-Arp, Dada, and Modernist abstraction. Staged photographs of the artist with the Tête Dada in the foreground have been reproduced in most publications about her work.

== Background and context ==
Sophie Taeuber-Arp (1889–1943) was a Swiss-born artist associated with Dada, Constructivism and Concrete Art. Trained in textile design and applied arts in St. Gallen, Munich and Hamburg, she combined craftsmanship with abstraction throughout her career. From 1916 onward, she was active in Zurich's Dada circle, centred on the Cabaret Voltaire, where she participated as dancer, designer, and visual artist.

Between 1918 and 1920, Taeuber-Arp produced a series of abstract wooden sculptures, commonly referred to as the Dada Heads in English. She worked on the sculptures during her involvement in Dada performances and her teaching at the Kunstgewerbeschule Zürich. In 1920, Taeubner-Arp chose a staged photograph of her head, partially obscured by Tête Dada in the foreground, for Tristan Tzara's 1920 anthology Dadaglobe about the Dada movement.

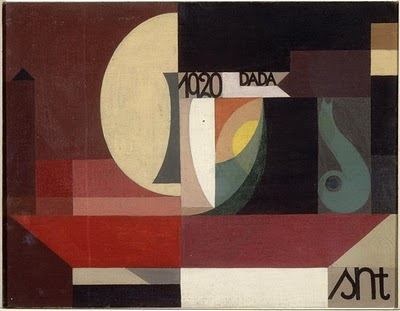
Dada Composition, 1920, Musée National d'Art Moderne

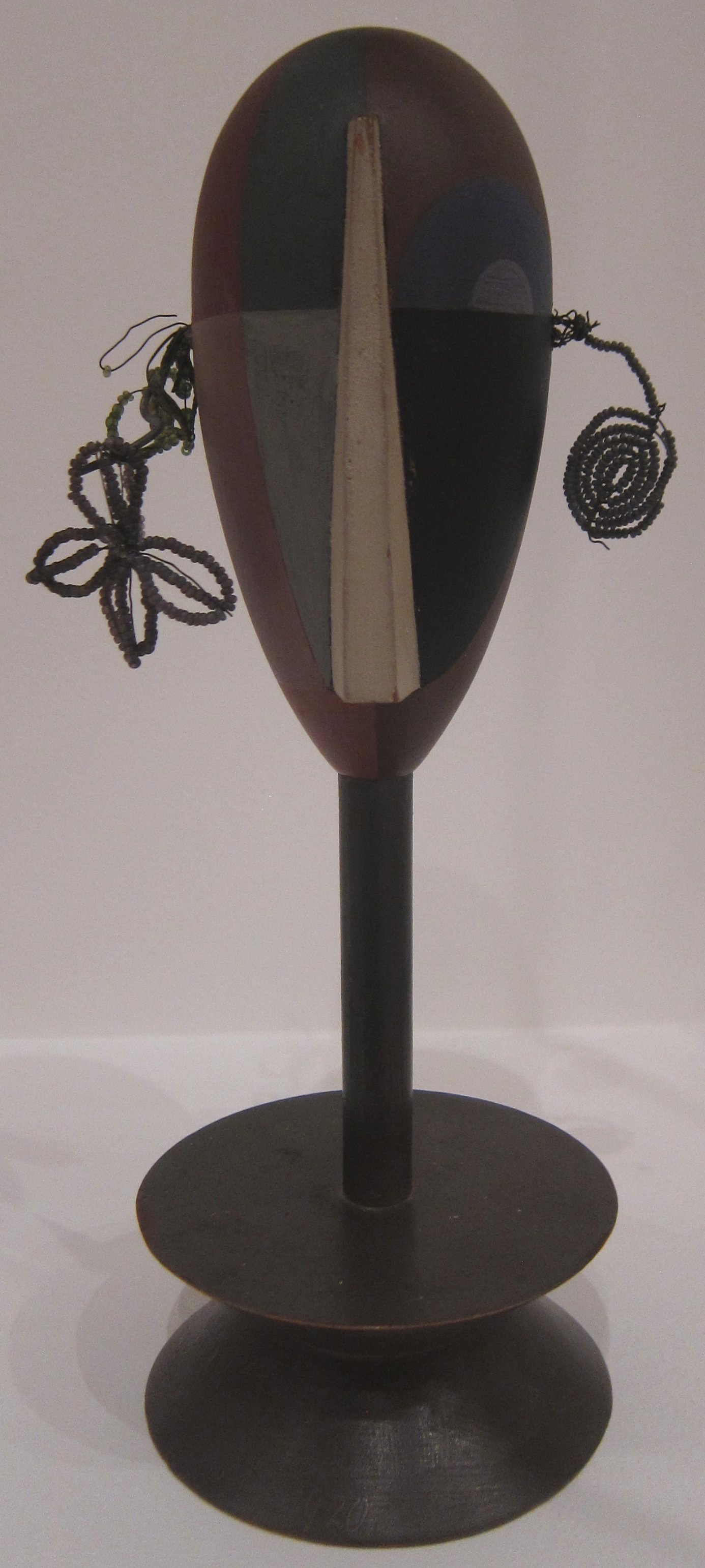
Head, 1920, Museum of Modern Art, NYC

Tête Dada is closely related to five other heads produced by Taeuber-Arp during this period, such as a wooden sculpture of an abstract head known as Portrait [HA], said to be a portrait of her future husband Jean Arp. A third sculpture known as Head, now in the collection of the Museum of Modern Art, shows an oval head with beaded glass accessories on either side. Together, these sculptures form a coherent group exploring modular geometry in three dimensions.

Taeuber-Arp's involvement in Dada included performing choreographed dances in abstract costumes and masks. Art historians have interpreted the Dada Heads as sculptural counterparts to these performances: objects that function as ironic portraits, ritual masks and formal experiments.

=== Description ===
Tête Dada is a polychromed wooden sculpture of 29,43 cm height and a diametre of 14 cm, created in 1919 or 1920. (Note: Some sources give 1919, but the work itself shows the year 1920 on its surface, and the Centre Pompidou and MoMa say it was created in 1920.) The sculpture consists of a vertically oriented, lathe-turned wooden form resembling a stylized human head mounted on a cylindrical base. This base carries the inscription sht, referring to the artist's birth name Sophie Henriette Taeuber. Further, the year 1920 and the word DADA are inscribed on the head.

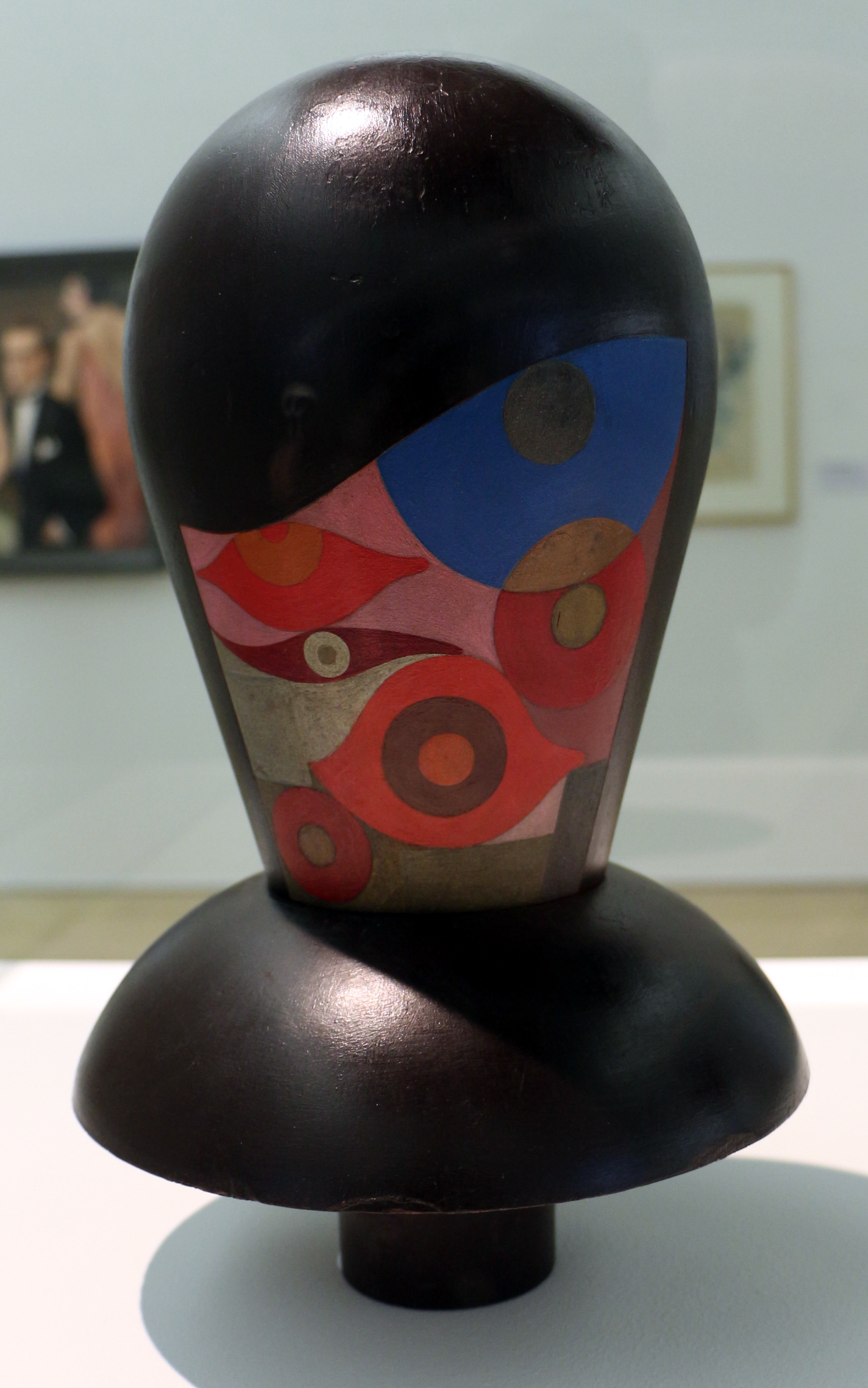
Dada Head, 1918/19, Musée National d'Art Moderne

The abstract head is painted in different zones of colour, including muted pastels, primary colours and sharply defined lines. The work's smooth, balanced shaping reflects the mechanical precision of traditional woodturning, while the painted surfaces introduce geometric abstraction. The colouring is oil and metallic paint.

=== Formal analysis and interpretation ===
The sculpture has aspects of both a human face and abstract, smooth geometric features. These are reminiscent of "primitive" masks and their asymmetrical arrangement resembes the techniques of Cubist paintings. By using the utilitarian object of a hat stand, Taeuber-Arp blurred distinctions between applied and fine art, a central concern in her practice. Both in her textile designs and her small sculptures, Taeuber-Arp wanted to create works in mixed media with bold, simplified shapes and in a "new style" that reflected her own time.

== Exhibitions ==
Tête Dada has been presented as part of the following exhibitions and corresponding exhibition catalogues:

- Elles font l'abstraction/Women in Abstraction. Centre Pompidou, Paris / Museo Guggenheim Bilbao, 2021
- Sophie Taeuber-Arp. Living Abstraction. Kunstmuseum Basel / Tate Modern, London / The Museum of Modern Art, New York, 2021
- Dadaglobe Reconstructed. Kunsthaus Zürich / Museum of Modern Art, New York, 2016
- Sophie Taeuber-Arp. Gestalterin, Architektin, Tänzerin. Museum Bellerive, Zurich, 2007
- Dada: Zurich, Berlin, Hanover, Cologne, New York, Paris. National Gallery of Art, Washington D.C. / Centre Pompidou, Paris / The Museum of Modern Art, New York, 2005
- DADA. Kunsthaus Zürich / Musée National d'Art Moderne, Paris, 1966
- Fantastic Art, Dada, Surrealism. The Museum of Modern Art, New York, 1936.

== Reception ==
Although Taeuber-Arp's contribution to Dada was overshadowed by that of her husband, Jean Arp, scholarship and major retrospectives, such as those in 2021-2022 at the Kunstmuseum Basel, the Museum of Modern Art and Tate Modern, established her as a central figure of classical modernism. As one of the artist's most appreciated works, Tête Dada has been called an "outstanding feature of her Dada oeuvre" within the Zurich Dada movement and an important early example of abstract sculpture by a woman artist in the European avant-garde. Reviews of Taeuber-Arp's exhibition at the Museum of Modern Art and Tate Modern have seen her work as part of contemporary reassessments of gender, fine art, applied crafts, and abstraction in modern art history.

In his introduction to an exhibition at the Aargauer Kunsthaus art museum, the show's curator was quoted:

What appears light and spontaneous, direct, and without frills, be it a pillow, a dance performance, or a line drawing, is always a composition that unites within it precision and sensation, constructed and spontaneous elements. Art-historical writings, on the contrary, urge an unambiguous categorization of individual works and of the entire oeuvre. The methods employed ... are stylistic assignments, genre-historical analyses, and biographical explanatory patterns. However, these do not do justice to Taeuber-Arp's production, which virtually defies established categorizations.

=== Photographs of the artist and her Dada Head ===
A 2019 article in an art-historical journal discussed three similar black-and-white staged photographs taken in 1920 of Taeuber-Arp with her Tête Dada. Explaining this selection, the author wrote: "A good example of a dominant image with a long and interesting social biography is that of 'Sophie Taeuber with Dada Head.'" Included in numerous books, catalogues and articles, Taeuber-Arp's photographs with the Tête Dada were found to be the most frequent illustrations of the artist's work. One of these pictures, showing the artist behind her Dada head, was part of an installation in the 2021/2022 touring exhibition Sophie Taeuber-Arp: Living Abstractionand the accompanying catalogue.

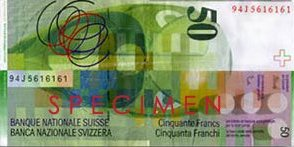
Back of banknote for 50 Swiss francs, 1995-2021

=== Image on Swiss banknote ===
The banknote for 50 Swiss francs, part of a series in circulation between 1995 and 2012, showed a portrait of Taeuber-Arp on its front side. Among some of her other works, a stylized image of Tête Dada was featured on the banknote's back side.

=== Tête Dada in museum ===
Acquired in 2003 from the legacy of Jean Arp's family, Tête Dada has since been part of the collection of the Musée National d'Art Moderne at the Centre Pompidou in Paris, France. During the museum's refurbishment, it will be exhibited until 2030 at the Centre Pompidou-Metz.
