= Michel Sanouillet =

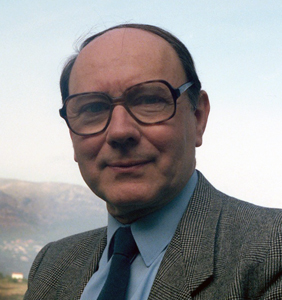
Michel Sanouillet in 1986

Michel Sanouillet (21 September 1924 – 14 June 2015) was a French art historian and one of the foremost specialists of the Dada movement.

Born in 1924 in Montélimar, Drôme, where he completed his public and high school education, Sanouillet joined the French Resistance in the Vercors in 1942. After a B.A. and an M.A. at the Sorbonne in 1945, he began working on 20th century avant-garde movements.

On June 26, 1965, at the Sorbonne, he defended with honours his two State doctoral theses: "Dada à Paris" and "Francis Picabia et 391", thus becoming the first university scholar to introduce the Parisian Dada movement to the public at large. Published as a book, Dada à Paris has been the founding work and the source of much of the research published on the subject since that time. The book makes use of exclusive first-hand documents summing up the information gleaned over twenty years from those of the Dada writers and artists who were still alive in the sixties and whom he knew personally, including Breton, Picabia, Tzara, Duchamp, Man Ray, Ribemont-Dessaignes, and Marcel Janco, as well as composer, Edgard Varèse, who socialized with Dadaists but was never a part of the movement. From 1950 to 1969 he taught at the University of Toronto, Canada, where he directed one of the first Canadian avant-garde films (Parking on This Side) which won Honourable Mention at the Canadian Film Awards of 1951. In Toronto he founded with his Canadian wife, Anne, a French-language newspaper Les Nouvelles françaises, opened a French bookstore, created a French ciné-club and a theatrical company "Les Tréteaux de Paris". In 1959 he collaborated with Marcel Duchamp in publishing the first edition of Duchamp's notes, Marchand du sel. In 1964, he was appointed research assistant at the CNRS (National Center for Scientific Research).

In France, from 1969 on, he was appointed first at the Université de Reims where he was head of the French Department, then in 1971 at the Université de Nice, where he became director of the Centre du XXe siècle ("Center of 20th Century Studies") in 1974, then dean of the UER Civilisations ("Department of Civilizations") in 1983. In 1975, with Robert Escarpit and Jean Meyriat, he founded the 52nd section of Information and Communication Sciences in the French university system. From 1968 to 1990 he gave over a hundred courses or lectures in some forty universities or cultural centers on all five continents. In 1985 he became a consultant for the Ministry of Research and Universities.

Michel Sanouillet died June 14, 2015. Sanouillet was assisting with the exhibition "Dadaglobe Reconstructed" in collaboration with the Museum of Modern Art in New York and the Kunsthaus Zurich to commemorate a little-known and unrealized 1921 publishing project by Tristan Tzara and the 100th anniversary of the founding of the Dada movement in 2016. Sanouillet was the first person to call to the attention of the public the existence of Dadaglobe with a published work in 1966. A preface to a book about the project was posthumously credited to Sanouillet and his wife Anne.

Other Activities

- 1964: Expert in modern and contemporary art to the Aix-en-Provence Court of Appeal.
- From 1975 to 1991: member of the National University Council (71st Section).
- President, vice-president or member of a dozen university appointment committees.
- Vice-president of the Society of 20th Century Studies
- Founder and first president of the International Association for the Study of Dada and Surrealism.

== Selected bibliography ==
Books

- 1959, Marchand du sel, Paris, Le Terrain Vague (writings of Marcel Duchamp, collected and presented by M.S. in collaboration with the author).
- 1960, Francis Picabia et 391, Vol. I. Paris, Le Terrain Vague.
- 1964, Picabia, Paris, Éditions du Temps (first book on the artist).
- 1965, Dada à Paris, Paris, Jean-Jacques Pauvert.
- 1968, Metafisica, Dada, Surrealismo, Milan, Fabbri (with Patrick Waldberg and Robert Lebel).
- 1969, Dada, Paris, Fernand Hazan.
- 1970, Il Movimento Dada, Milan, Fabbri.
- 1974, Documents Dada, Paris, Weber-Skira, (with Yves Poupard-Lieussou).
- 1975, Duchamp du signe, with Elmer Peterson, Paris, Flammarion (reprinted, adapted, translated or pirated many times).
- 1976, Dada, critical reprint of Tristan Tzara's periodical (1916–1922), Vol. I. Nice, Centre du XXe Siècle (with Dominique Baudouin).
- 1978, Proverbe, Nice, Centre du XXe siècle, critical reprint of Paul Éluard's periodical (1920).
- 1979, Dada à Paris, Japanese translation, Tokyo, Hakusuisha.
- 1980, Francis Picabia et 391, Vol. II. Nice, Centre du XXe siècle.
- 1980, Dada à Paris, Nice, Centre du XXe siècle.
- 1984, Dada, critical reprint of Tristan Tzara's periodical (1916–1922), Vol. II. Nice, Centre du XXe siècle
- 1993, Dada à Paris, Paris, Flammarion.
- 1999, Dada à Paris, Russian translation, Moscow, Ladomir.
- 2005, Dada à Paris, new edition, Paris, CNRS Éditions.
- 2008, Marcel Duchamp, Duchamp du signe suivi de Notes (Writings collected and presented by Michel Sanouillet and Paul Matisse, Paris, Flammarion.
- 2009, Dada in Paris, 1st English-language edition, revised and expanded by Anne Sanouillet, The MIT Press, Cambridge Massachusetts.

Periodicals edited

- Revue de l'Association pour l'Étude du mouvement Dada, Paris, 1965.
- Cahiers Dada-surréalisme, Paris, Minard, 1966–1970.
- Medianalyses, notebooks on research in communication, Nice, Centre du XXe siècle, 1981–1990.

Articles

- 1966, Le Dossier de Dadaglobe, in "Cahiers de l'association internationale pour l'étude de Dada et du Surréalisme, no. 1," Paris. (first scholarly mention of Dadaglobe since Tzara in 1921.)
- 2016, 'Preface', with Anne Sanouillet, in "Dadaglobe Reconstructed," by Kunsthaus Zürich, Scheidegger and Spiess, Zürich, Switzerland, May 15, 2016.
- Plus about fifty articles, mostly related to Dada, published in various French and foreign publications.
