= Dadaglobe =

Uncompleted avant-garde anthology

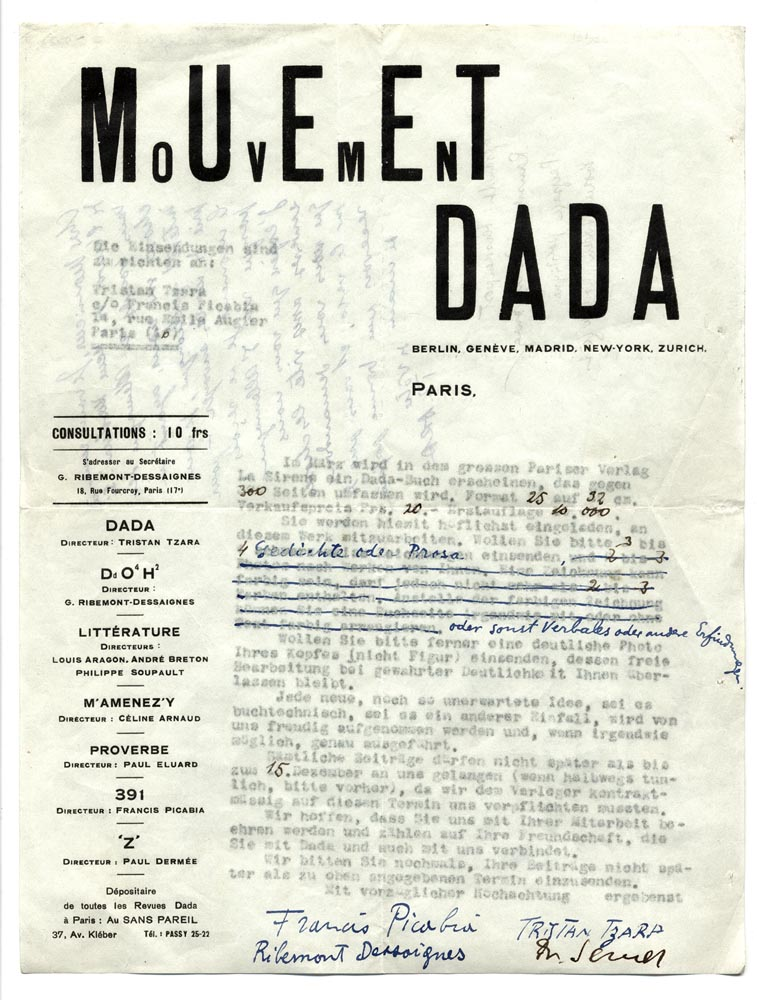
Dadaglobe solicitation form letter signed by Francis Picabia, Tristan Tzara, Georges Ribemont-Dessaignes, and Walter Serner, c. week of November 8, 1920. This example was sent from Paris to Alfred Vagts in Munich.

Dadaglobe was an anthology of the Dada movement slated for publication in 1921, but abandoned for financial and other reasons and never published. At 160 pages with over a hundred reproductions of artworks and over a hundred texts by some fifty artists in ten countries, Dadaglobe was to have documented Dada's apogee as an artistic and literary movement of international breadth. Edited by Dada co-founder Tristan Tzara (1896-1963) in Paris, Dadaglobe was not conceived as a summary of the movement since its founding in 1916, but rather meant to be a snapshot of its expanded incarnation at war's end. Not merely a vehicle for existing works, the project functioned as one of Dada's most generative catalysts for the production of new works.

== History ==
Max Ernst, 1920, Punching Ball (l'Immortalité de Buonarroti), photomontage, gouache and ink on photograph

The Dadaglobe solicitation letter, sent from Paris in early November 1920, requested four types of visual submissions—photographic portraits (which could be manipulated, but should "retain clarity"); original drawings; photographs of artworks; and designs for book pages—along with prose, poetry, or other verbal "inventions." Contributors included Jean (Hans) Arp, Marcel Duchamp, Max Ernst, George Grosz, John Heartfield, Hannah Höch, Francis Picabia, Man Ray, Kurt Schwitters, and Sophie Taeuber among others (see full list of contributors below).

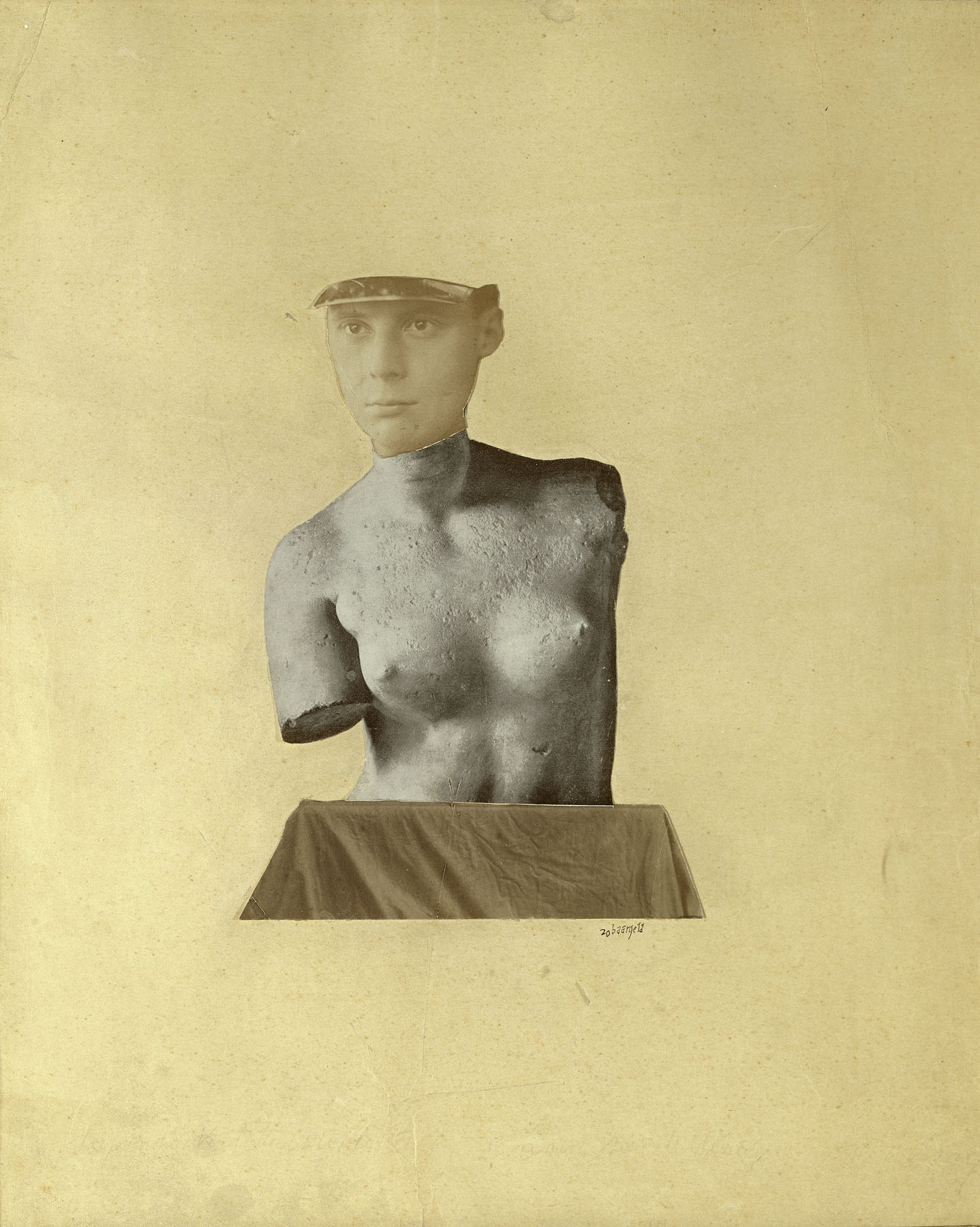
Johannes Baargeld, 1920, Typical Vertical Mess as Depiction of the Dada Baargeld (Typische Vertikalklitterung als Darstellung des Dada Baargeld)

Some of Dada's most iconic artworks were created in direct response to the Dadaglobe solicitation letter: Ernst's self-portrait montage commonly known as Dadamax (The Punching Ball or the Immortality of Buonarroti) and his Chinese Nightingale, Taeuber's Dada Head, and Baargeld's Typical Vertical Mess as Depiction of the Dada Baargeld are just a few examples. These works were conceived by the artists with their presentation in reproduction foremost in mind. Dadaglobe was to have been a manifesto on the revised status of the artwork in reproduction.

The volume was advertised in Duchamp's and Man Ray's journal New York Dada in 1921: "Order from the publishing house 'La Sirène' 7 rue Pasquier, Paris, DADAGLOBE, the work of dadas from all over the world […] The incalculable number of pages of reproductions and of text is a guarantee of the success of the book." When André Breton, later founder of Surrealism, saw the intended contents of the book, he remarked: "The grand album 'Dadaglobe' […] will soon appear. […] After the publication of this volume it will be impossible to contest Dada's artistic value."

In scope, ambition, and even title, Tzara's Paris-based Dadaglobe, was modeled on Richard Huelsenbeck's Berlin-based, Dadaco, planned the previous year, but also abandoned and never published. Dadaglobe reached an advanced stage of planning before financial and interpersonal obstacles put a halt to the project in spring 1921.

== Dadaglobe Reconstructed ==
Numerous archival traces provide an indication of the intended contents of Dadaglobe. The French scholar Michel Sanouillet (1924-2015) rediscovered the abandoned project and, in 1966, published a selection of the texts intended for the original anthology. On the occasion of Dada's centennial in 2016, American scholar Adrian Sudhalter published Dadaglobe Reconstructed, a book that includes a 160-page reconstruction of Dadaglobe within a scholarly context, accompanied by a preface by Sanouillet. The publication accompanies Sudhalter's exhibition of the same name, on view at the Kunsthaus Zürich (February 5-May 1, 2016) and The Museum of Modern Art, New York (June 12-September 18, 2016).

== Participants ==
Participants in Dadaglobe included:

- Louis Aragon (1897-1982), France
- Jean Arp (1886-1966), Germany, France
- Johannes Baader (1875 –1955), Germany
- Johannes Theodor Baargeld (1892–1927), Germany
- Egidio Bacchi (1897-1963), Italy
- Erwin Blumenfeld (1897–1969), Germany, Netherlands, France, USA
- Constantin Brâncuși (1876-1957), Romania, France
- André Breton (1896-1966), France
- Gabrielle Buffet-Picabia (1881-1985), France
- Margueritte Buffet
- Gino Cantarelli (1899 – 1950). Italy
- Serge Charchoune (1889-1975), Russia, France
- Paul Citroen (1896-1983), Germany, Netherlands
- Jean Cocteau (1889-1963), France
- Jean Crotti (1886-1951), France, USA
- Paul Dermée (1886-1951), Belgium, France
- Theo van Doesburg (1883-1931) Netherlands
- Marcel Duchamp (1887-1968), France
- Suzanne Duchamp (1889-1963), France
- Jacques Edwards
- Paul Éluard (1895-1952), France
- Max Ernst (1891-1976), Germany, USA
- Julius Evola (1898-1974), Italy
- Aldo Fiozzi
- Elsa von Freytag-Loringhoven (1874-1927), Germany, USA
- Otto Griebel (1895-1972), Germany
- George Grosz (1893-1959), Germany, France, USA
- Job Haubric
- Raoul Hausmann (1886-1971), Germany
- John Heartfield (1891-1968), Germany, USSR, Czechoslovakia, Great Britain
- Hannah Höch (1889-1978), Germany
- Richard Huelsenbeck (1892-1974), Germany
- Marcel Janco (1895-1984), Romania, Israel
- Adon Lacroix (1887–1975), Belgium, USA
- Clément Pansaers (1885-1922), Belgium
- Benjamin Péret (1899-1959), France
- Francis Picabia (1879-1953), France
- Man Ray (1890-1976), France, USA
- Georges Ribemont-Dessaignes (1884-1974), France
- Jacques Rigaut (1898-1929), France
- Kurt Schwitters (1887-1948), Germany
- Philippe Soupault (1897-1990), France
- Joseph Stella (1877-1946), Italy, USA
- Luise Straus (Armada von Duldgedalzen) (1893-1944), Germany
- Sophie Taeuber-Arp (1889-1943), Switzerland, France
- Guillermo de Torre (1900-1971), Spain, France, Argentina
- Tristan Tzara (1896-1963), Romania, France
- Alfred Vagts (1892-1986), Germany, USA
- Edgar Varèse (1883–1965), France, USA
- Melchoir Vischer (1895-1975), Germany
- Fried-Hardy Worm

== See also ==
- Dada
- New York Dada
