= Fried-Hardy Worm =

Fried-Hardy Worm (8 February 1896, Berlin – 29 August 1973, Berlin) was a left-wing German journalist, satirist and publisher.

He was a soldier in the First World War and participated in the November Revolution in 1918. Active in the Spartacist Uprising, he was imprisoned for six months in Moabit Prison, where he had a cell next to Karl Radek. He published several short-lived grotesque Dadaist magazines, such as Harakiri? (1920) and Das Bordell (The Brothel, 1921).
