= Sophie Taeuber-Arp =

Swiss artist (1889–1943)

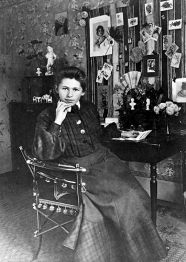
- Born: Sophie Henriette Gertrud Taeuber; 19 January 1889; Davos, Switzerland
- Died: 14 January 1943 (aged 53); Zürich, Switzerland
- Education: Gewerbeschule in St. Gallen, Dschebitz-Schule in Munich, and Kunstgewerbeschule in Hamburg
- Known for: Sculpture, painting, textile design, dancing
- Movement: Concrete Art, Constructivism, Dada
- Spouse: Jean Arp

Sophie Henriette Gertrud Taeuber-Arp (/ˈtɔɪbər ˈɑːrp/; 19 January 1889 – 14 January 1943) was a Swiss artist, painter, sculptor, textile designer, furniture and interior designer, architect, and dancer.

Born in 1889 in Davos and raised in Trogen, Switzerland, she attended a trade school in St. Gallen and, later, art schools in Germany, before moving back to Switzerland during the First World War. At an exhibition in 1915, she met for the first time the German-French artist Jean Arp, whom she married shortly after. It was during these years that they became associated with the Dada movement, which emerged in 1916, and Taeuber-Arp's most famous works, such as Dada Head (Tête Dada, 1920), date from these years. They moved to France in 1926, where they stayed until the invasion of France during the Second World War, at the event of which they went back to Switzerland. In 1943, she died in an accident with a leaking gas stove.

Despite having largely been overlooked since her death, she is considered one of the most important artists of concrete art and geometric abstraction of the 20th century.

== Early life and education ==
Born in Davos, Switzerland, Sophie Henriette Gertrud Taeuber was the fifth child of Prussian pharmacist Emil Taeuber and Swiss Sophie Taeuber-Krüsi, from Gais in Appenzell Ausserrhoden, Switzerland. Her parents operated a pharmacy in Davos until her father died of tuberculosis when she was two years old, after which the family moved to Trogen, where her mother opened a pension. She was taught to sew by her mother.

From 1906 till 1910 she studied textile design at the trade school (Gewerbeschule, today School of Applied Arts) in St. Gallen. She then moved on to the workshop of Wilhelm von Debschitz at his school in Munich, where she studied in 1911 and again in 1913. The school in Munich was focused on applied crafts. In between, she studied for a year at the School of Arts and Crafts (Kunstgewerbeschule) in Hamburg. In 1914 World War I started, so she returned to Switzerland.

In Zurich she occupied herself with nonfigurative art experimentation. Based on the grid structures of textiles she produced a Vertical-Horizontal series. She later became known for pioneering abstract modular colour sequences. She joined the Schweizerischer Werkbund in 1915. In the same year, she attended the Laban School of Dance in Zürich, and in the summer she joined the artist colony of Monte Verita in Ascona. In 1917, she danced with Suzanne Perrottet, Mary Wigman and others at the Sun Festival organised by Laban in Ascona. From 1916 to 1929, Taeuber was an instructor at the Kunstgewerbeschule Zürich, teaching embroidery and design classes.

== Dada ==
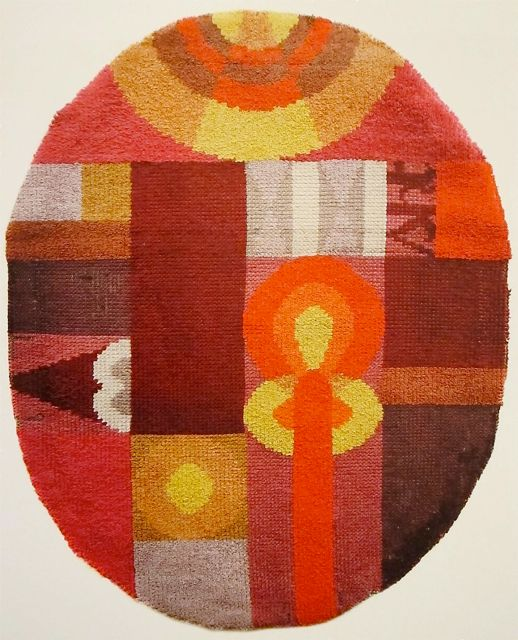
Oval Composition with Abstract Motifs, 1922

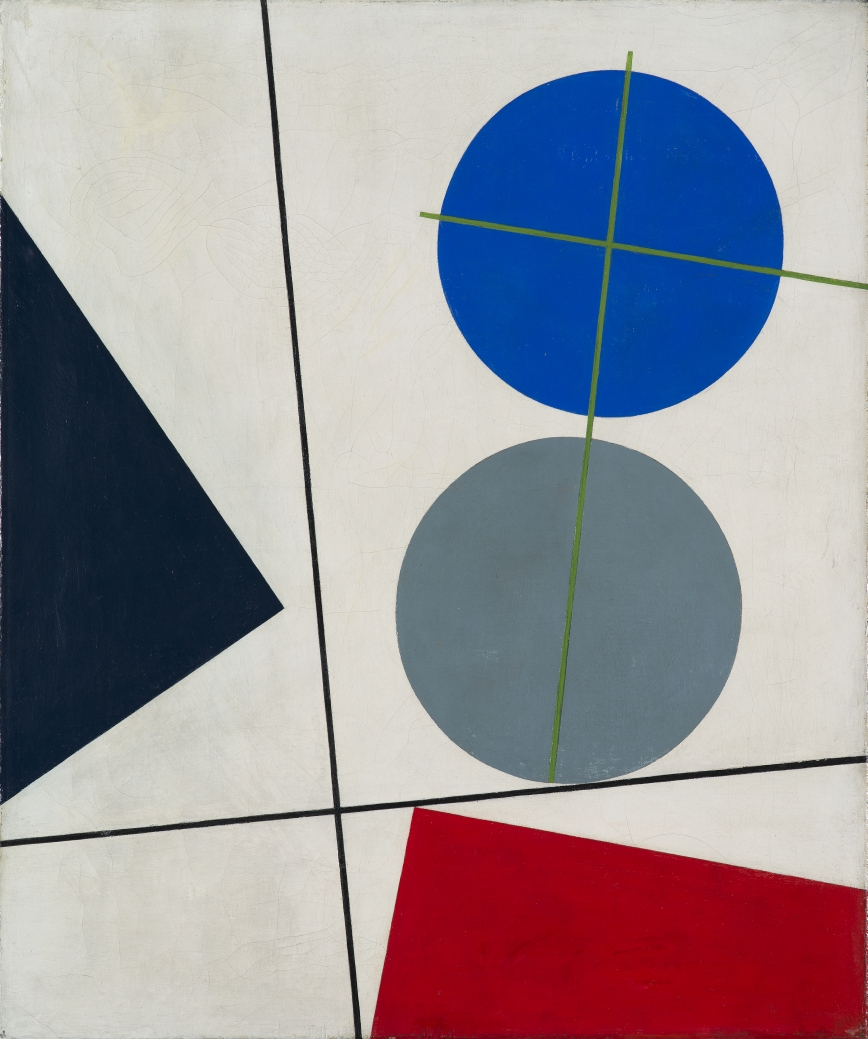
Composition, 1931

Grasse – geometric and wavy lines, 1940 (colored pencil on paper, 26 x 34.4 cm)

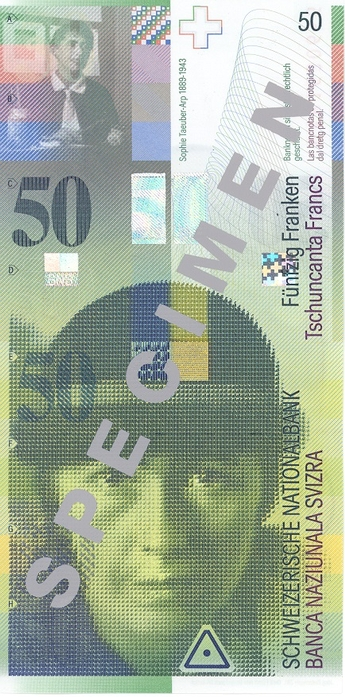
Taeuber-Arp on the 50 Swiss Franc note

In 1915, at an exhibition at the Tanner Gallery, she met the Dada artist Jean Arp, who had moved to Zürich in 1915 to avoid being drafted by the German Army during the First World War. They were to collaborate on numerous joint projects until her death in 1943. They married in 1922 and she changed her last name to Taeuber-Arp.

Taeuber-Arp taught weaving and other textile arts at the Kunstgewerbeschule Zürich (now Zurich University of the Arts) from 1916 to 1929. Her textile and graphic works from around 1916 through to the 1920s are among the earliest Constructivist works, along with those of Piet Mondrian and Kasimir Malevich. These sophisticated geometric abstractions reflect a subtle understanding of the interplay between colour and form.

During this period, she was involved in the Zürich Dada movement, which centred on the Cabaret Voltaire. She took part in Dada-inspired performances as a dancer, choreographer, and puppeteer, and she designed puppets, costumes and sets for performances at the Cabaret Voltaire as well as for other Swiss and French theatres. At the opening of the Galerie Dada in 1917, she danced to poetry by Hugo Ball while wearing a shamanic mask by Marcel Janco. A year later, she was a co-signer of the Zürich Dada Manifesto. As both a dancer and painter, Taeuber was able to incorporate Dada in her movement for dancing and was described as obscure and awkward.

She also made a number of sculptural works, such as a set of abstract "Dada Heads", including the Tête Dada of turned polychromed wood. With their resemblance to the ubiquitous small stands used by hatmakers, they typified her elegant synthesis of the fine and applied arts.

Taeuber-Arp was also a close friend and contemporary of the French-Romanian avant-garde poet, essayist, and artist, Tristan Tzara, one of the central figures of the Dada movement. In 1920, Tzara solicited over four dozen Dadaist artists, among which were Taeuber-Arp, Jean Arp, Jean Cocteau, Marcel Duchamp, and Hannah Höch. Tzara planned to use the contributed text and images to create an anthology of Dada work entitled Dadaglobe. A worldwide release of 10,000 copies was planned, but the project was abandoned when its main backer, Francis Picabia, distanced himself from Tzara in 1921.

The Guardian called her a "radical artist who brought joy to the dada". Though dada has been described as an early form of subversive pop culture likened by some to the punk subculture, critics have said that Taeuber's artworks were not angry but "joyous abstractions", created as part of a movement that has been called revolutionary for its influence challenging the established conventions of art by "playing with blocks and blobs of colour, moving them around randomly, letting patterns emerge by chance, in a kind of visual jazz."

== France ==
Four spaces with red rolling circles, 1932, gouache on paper

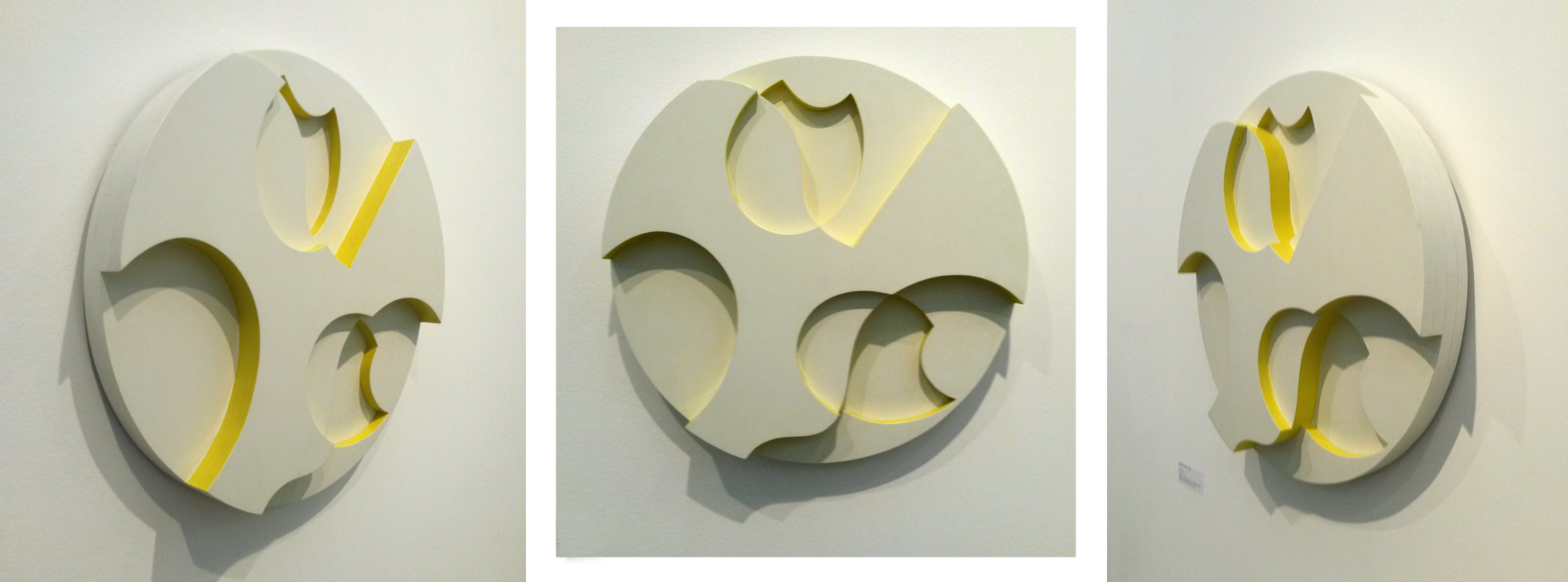
Relief at three levels, 1937 or 1938

Between 1926 and 1928 Taeuber-Arp spent time in Strasbourg, her husband had moved to Strasbourg in order to fulfill the residency requirements for French citizenship. In Strasbourg Taeuber-Arp completed her first architecture and interior design commission. Taeuber-Arp and her husband both took up French citizenship, after which they divided their time between Strasbourg and Paris. There Taeuber-Arp received numerous commissions for interior design projects. She was commissioned to create a radically Constructivist interior for the Café de l'Aubette – a project on which Jean Arp and de Stijl artist Theo van Doesburg eventually joined her as collaborators. In 1927, she co-authored a book entitled Welly Lowell with Blanche Gauchet.

From the late 1920s, she and Arp lived mainly in Paris and continued experimenting with design. In 1928, the couple established a household in Meudon/Val-Fleury, outside Paris, where she designed their new house and some of its furnishings. Their new home served as a meeting place, bringing together artists and writers like Nelly van Doesburg, Max Ernst, James Joyce, and Meret Oppenheim, among many others. She was an exhibitor at the Salon des surindépendents in Paris between 1929 and 1930.

In the 1930s, she was a member of the group Cercle et Carré, founded by Michel Seuphor and Joaquín Torres García as a standard-bearer of non-figurative art, and its successor, the Abstraction-Création group (1931–34). Taeuber-Arp also provided the cover art for the February 1933 issue of Eugene Jolas's avant-garde little magazine, transition. Taeuber-Arp explored the circle which represented the cosmic metaphor, the form that contains all others. She referred to this period as “ping pictures”. She appears to be the first artist to use polka dots in fine art with works such as the 1934 Dynamic Circles, following in the footsteps of Kazimir Malevich and his 1915 Black Circle.

Later in the decade Taeuber-Arp founded a Constructivist review, Plastique (Plastic) in Paris. Her circle of friends included the artists Sonia Delaunay, Robert Delaunay, Wassily Kandinsky, Joan Miró, and Marcel Duchamp. She was also a member of Allianz, a union of Swiss painters, from 1937 to 1943. In 1940, Taeuber-Arp and Arp fled Paris ahead of the Nazi occupation and moved to Grasse in Vichy France, where they created an art colony with Sonia Delaunay, Alberto Magnelli, and other artists. At the end of 1942, they fled to Switzerland.

== Death and legacy ==
In early 1943, Taeuber-Arp missed the last tram home one night and slept in a snow-covered summer house. She died there of accidental carbon monoxide poisoning caused by an incorrectly operated stove at the house of Max Bill.

Wassily Kandinsky said: "Sophie Taeuber-Arp expressed herself by means of the 'colored relief,' especially in the last years of her life, using almost exclusively the simplest forms, geometric forms. The forms, by their sobriety, their silence, their way of being sufficient unto themselves, invite the hand, if it is skillful, to use the language that is suitable to it and which is often only a whisper; but often too the whisper is more expressive, more convincing, more persuasive, than the 'loud voice' that here and there lets itself burst out."

In 2014, at the Danser sa vie dance and art exhibition at the Centre Georges Pompidou in France, a photograph was displayed of Taeuber-Arp dancing in a highly stylized mask and costume at the Cabaret Voltaire in 1917.

Taeuber-Arp was the only woman on the eighth series of Swiss banknotes; her portrait was on the 50-franc note from 1995 to 2016.

A museum honouring Taeuber-Arp and Jean Arp opened in 2007 in a section of the Rolandseck railway station in Germany, re-designed by Richard Meier. The video work "Sophie Taeuber-Arp's Vanishing Lines" (2015) by new media artist Myriam Thyes from Switzerland is about her "Lignes" drawings, segmented circles intersected by lines.

On 19 January 2016, Google created a Google Doodle for Taeuber-Arp to commemorate her 127th birthday. The doodle was made by Mark Holmes.

== Exhibitions ==
Taeuber-Arp took part in numerous exhibitions. For example, she was included in the first Carré exhibition at the Galeries 23 (Paris) in 1930, along with other notable early 20th-century modernists. In 1943, Taeuber-Arp was included in Peggy Guggenheim's show Exhibition by 31 Women at the Art of This Century gallery in New York. Many museums around the world have her work in their collections, but in the public consciousness her reputation lagged for many years behind that of her more famous husband. Sophie Taeuber-Arp began to gain substantial recognition only after the Second World War, and her work is now generally accepted as in the first rank of classical modernism. An important milestone was the exhibition of her work at documenta 1 in 1955.

In 1970, an exhibit of Taeuber-Arp's work was shown at the Albert Loeb Gallery in New York City.

Then, in 1981, the Museum of Modern Art (New York) mounted a retrospective of her work that subsequently travelled to the Museum of Contemporary Art (Chicago), the Museum of Fine Arts (Houston), Musée d'art contemporain de Montréal.

American scholar Adrian Sudhalter organized an exhibition called "Dadaglobe Reconstructed" that sought to honor the centennial of Dada's inception, along with Tzara's ambitious project. Compiling over 100 works of art that were initially slated to appear in Tristan Tzara's Dadaglobe anthology, among which are works by Taeuber-Arp, the show ran from 5 February to 1 May 2016 at the Kunsthaus Zürich, and from 12 June to 18 September 2016 at the Museum of Modern Art in New York City.

In 2020, Hauser & Wirth opened an online exhibition devoted to her work, the first in a series of international exhibitions devoted to her career. In 2021 the Kunstmuseum Basel presented a retrospective entitled Sophie Taeuber-Arp: Living Abstraction. The show traveled to the Tate Modern (15 July – 17 October) and then to the MoMA. Showing over 400 pieces, it was the UK's first retrospective of her work, and, in America, it was the most comprehensive and her first major exhibition in the country in 40 years.

Taeuber-Arp's work was included in the travelling exhibition Women in Abstraction that started in 2021 at the Centre Pompidou.

== Gallery ==
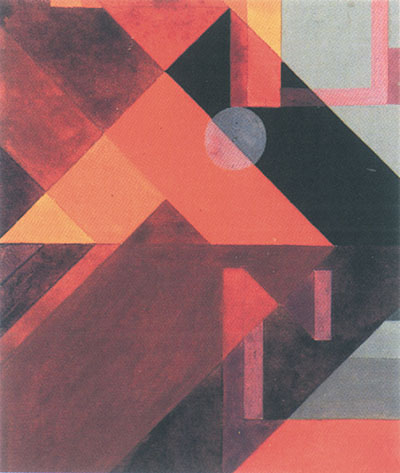
Composition with Diagonals and Circle, painting, 1916

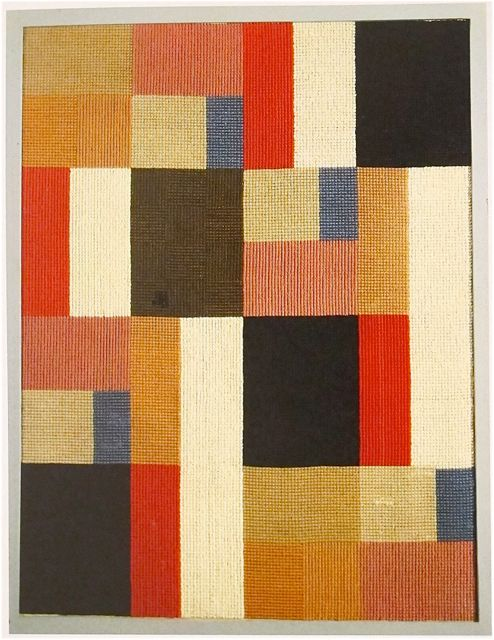
Vertical-Horizontal Composition, textile, 1916

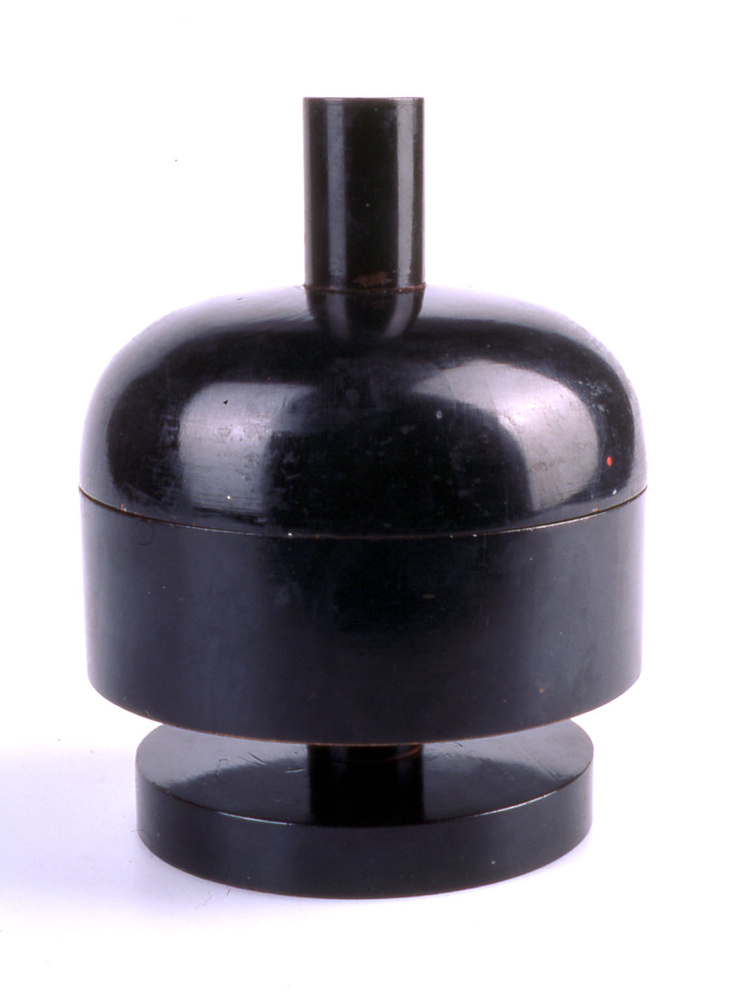
Coupe Dada, sculpture, 1916

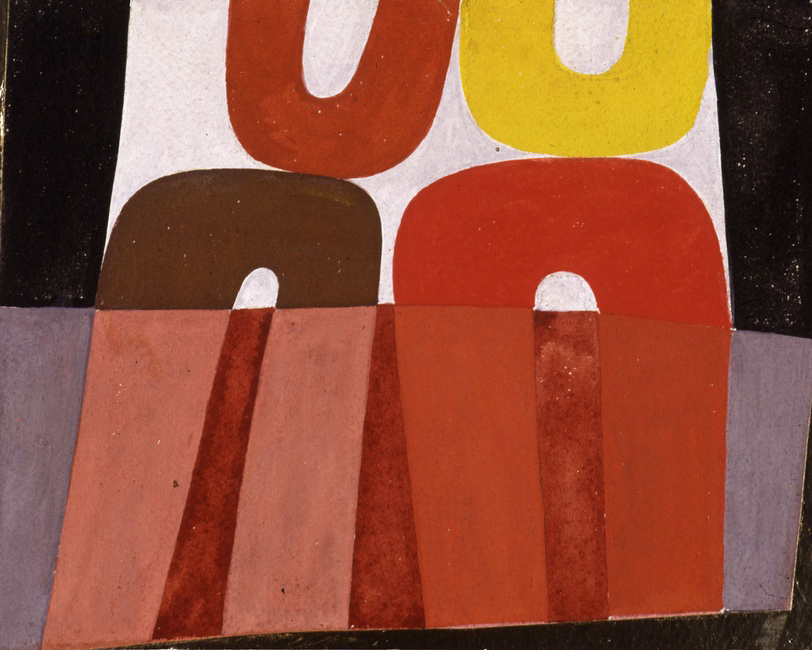
Arch pattern composition, gouache on paper, 1918

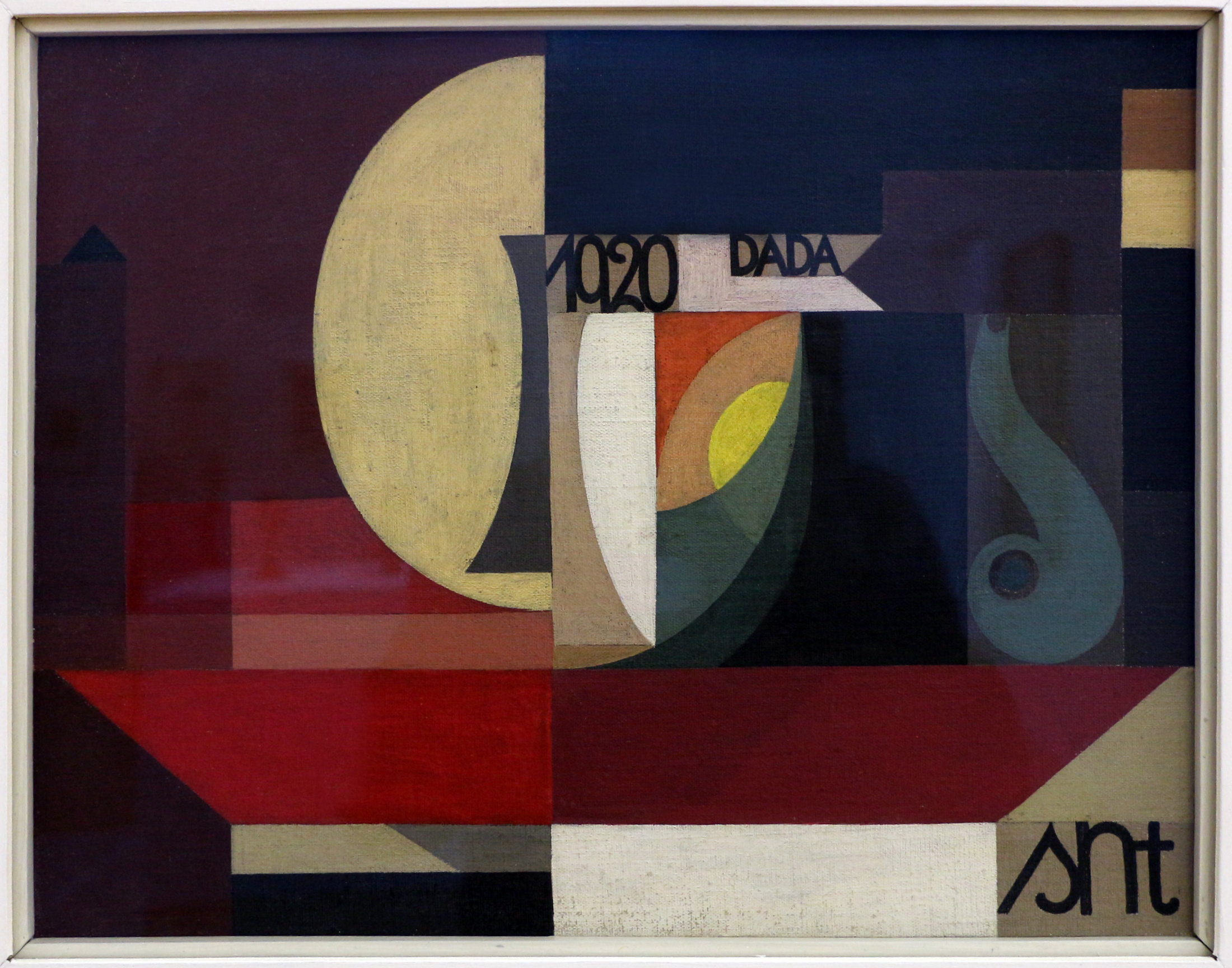
Dada Composition (Tête au plat), painting, 1920

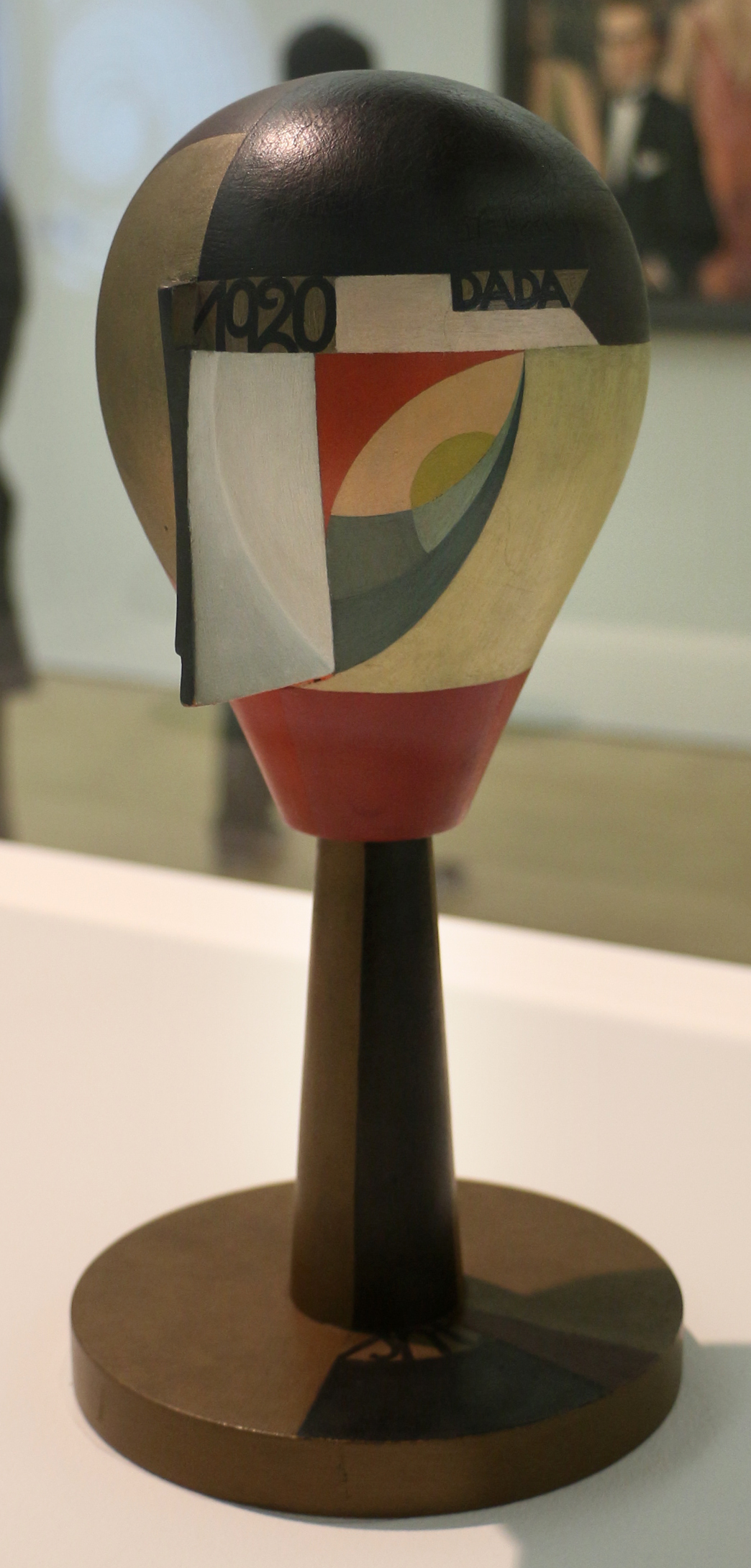
Tête Dada, wood sculpture, 1920

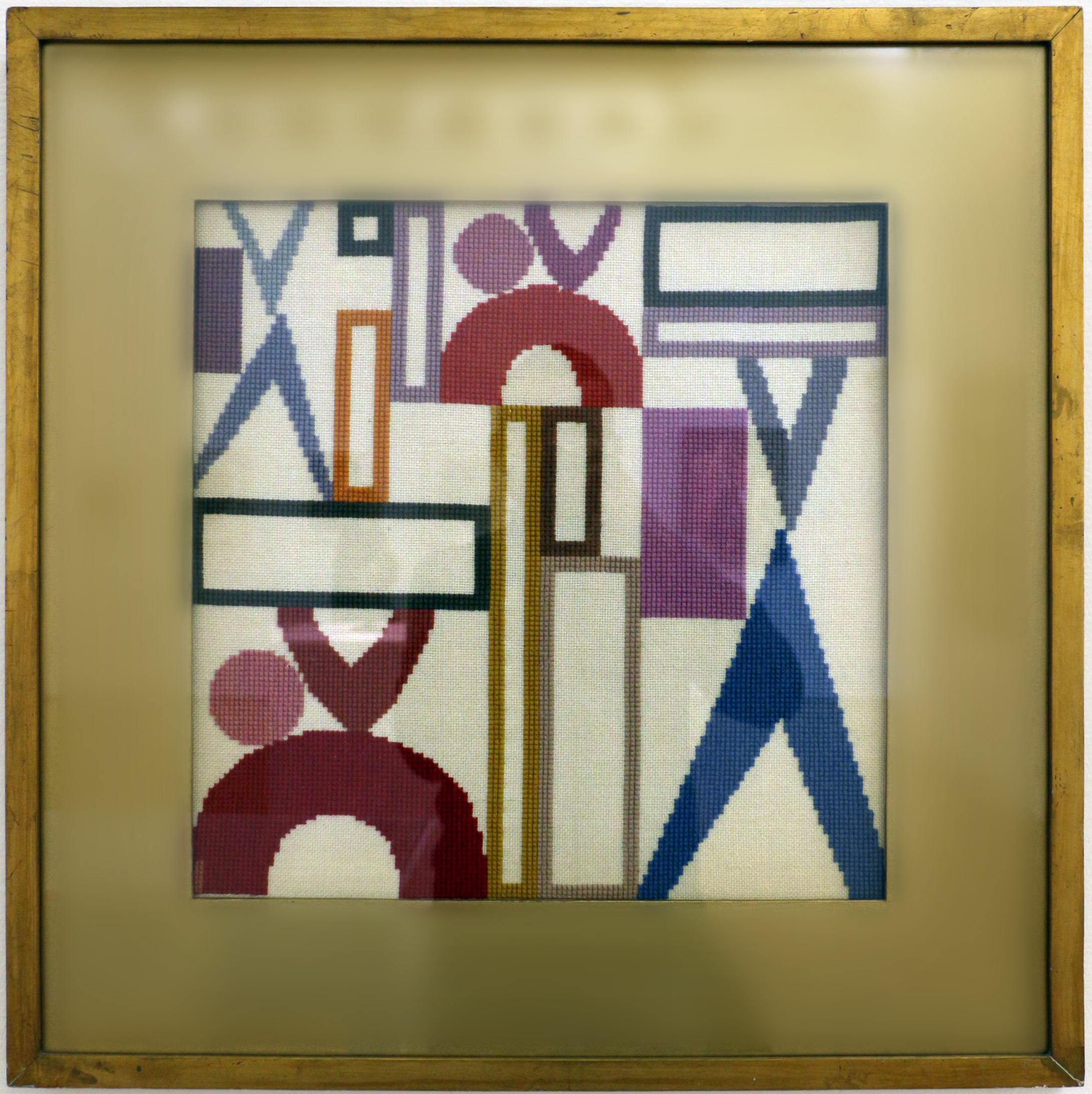
Dada carpet, 1920

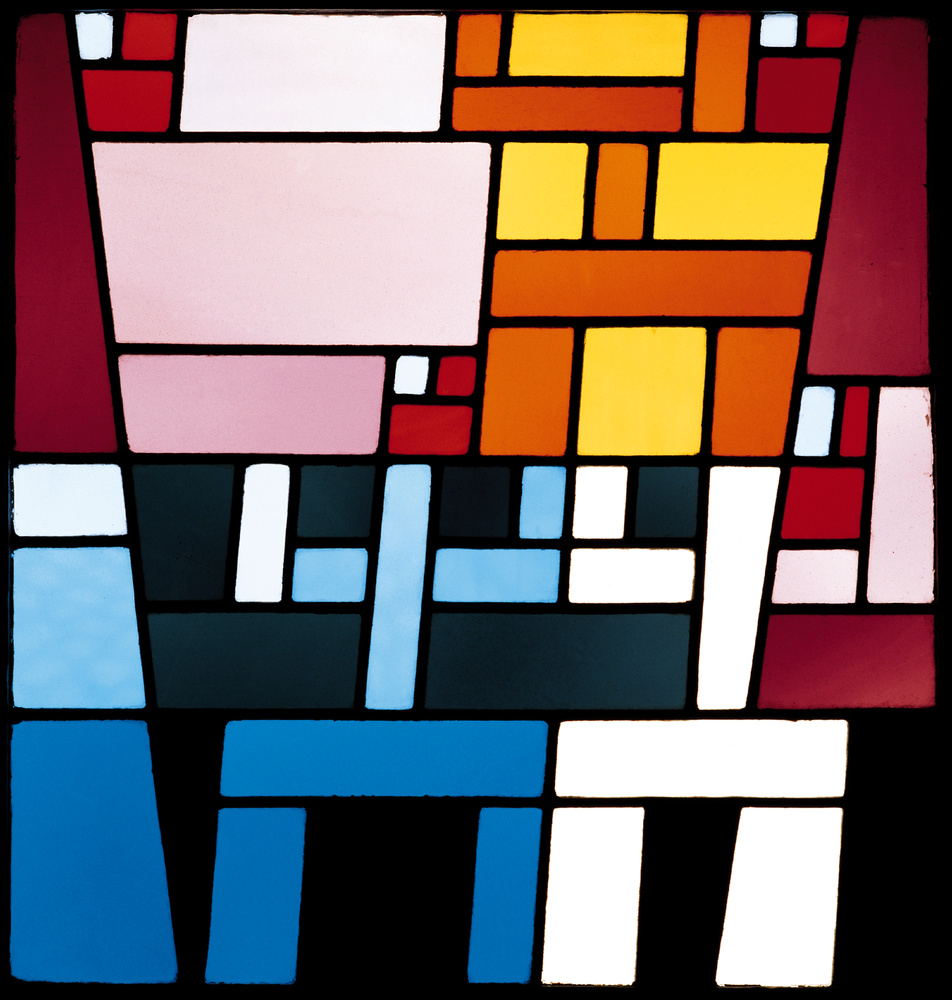
Abstract composition, stained glass, 1926–27

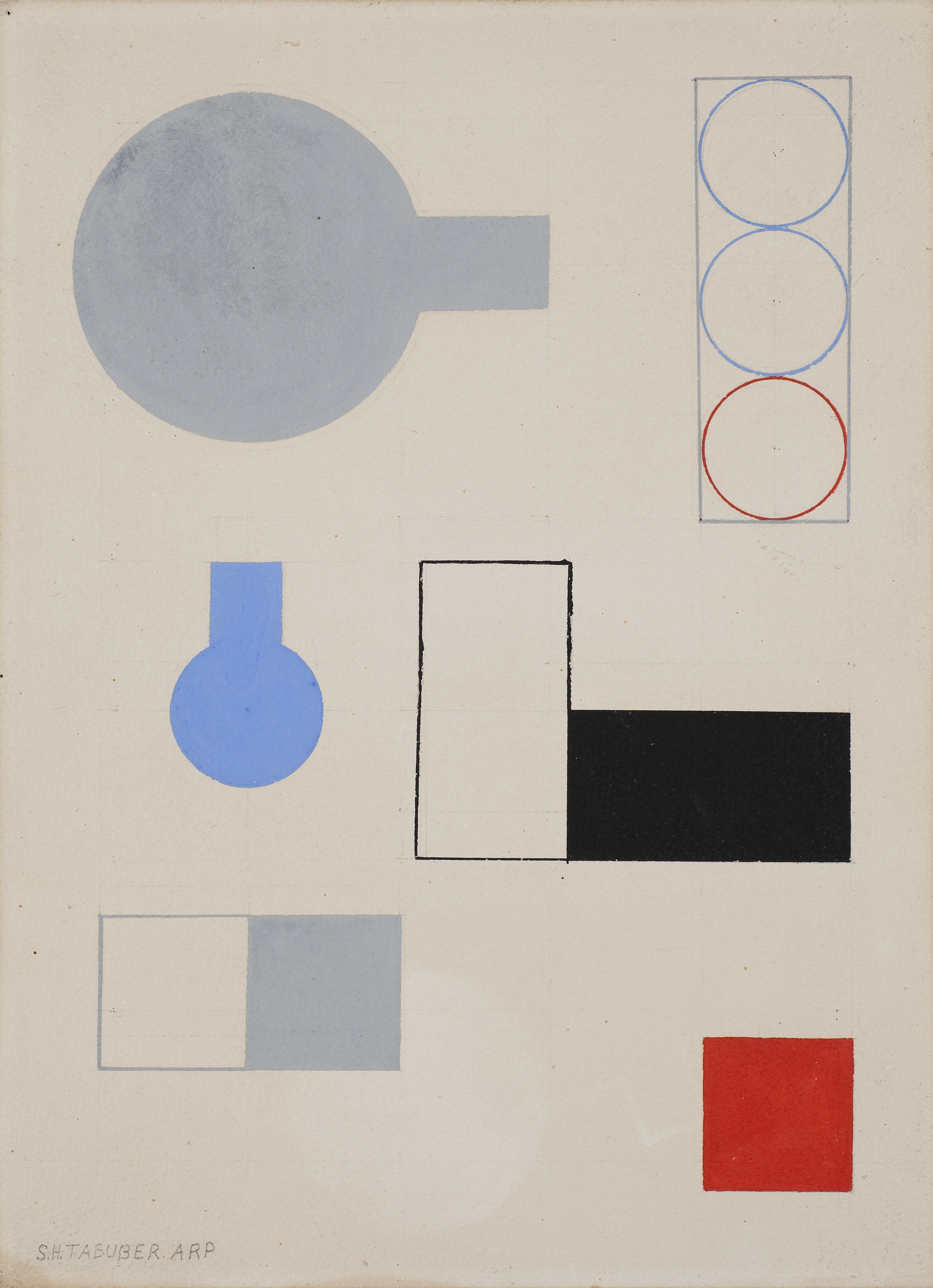
Composition r, gouache on paper, 1931

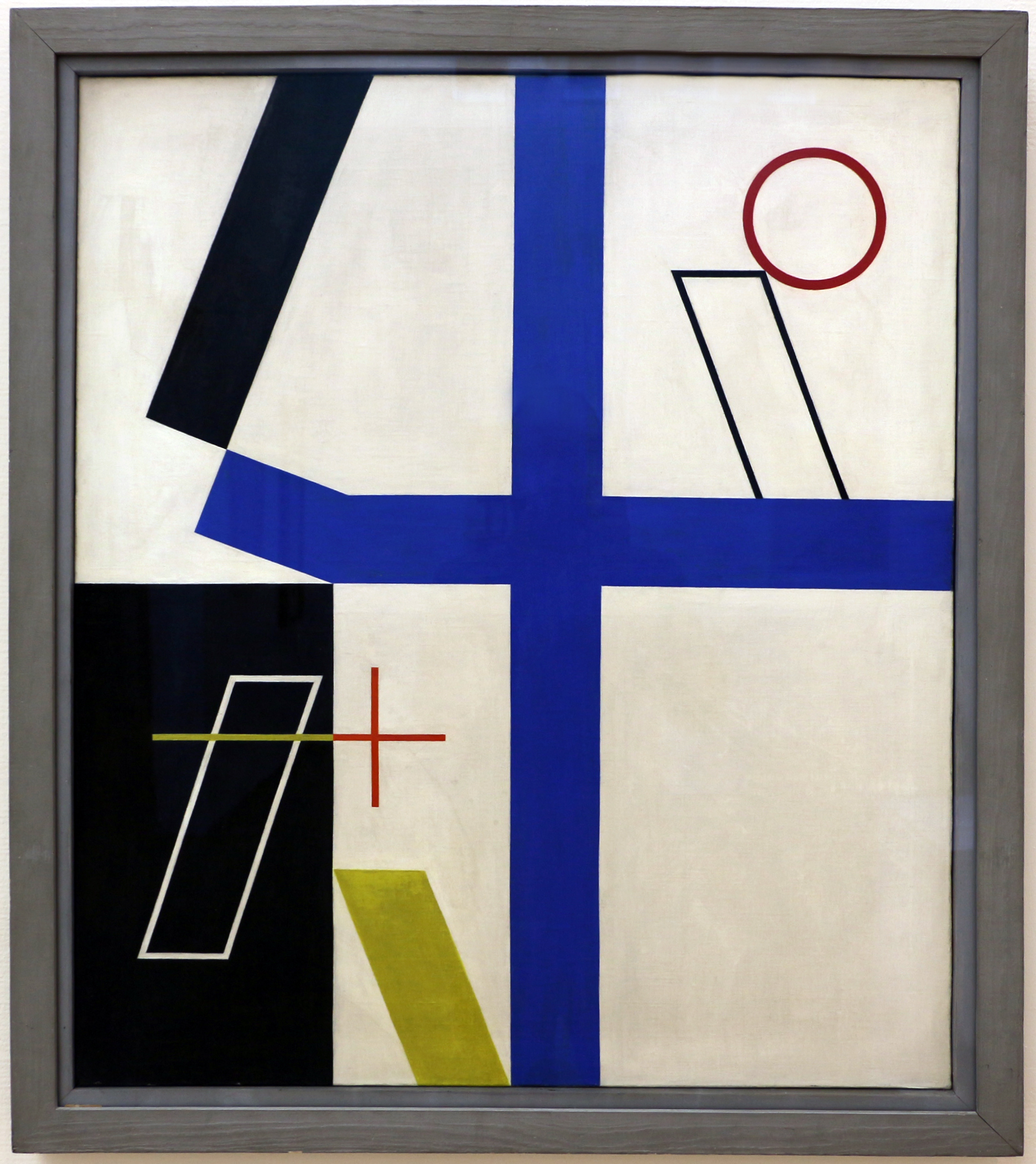
Quatre espaces à croix brisée, oil on canvas, 1932

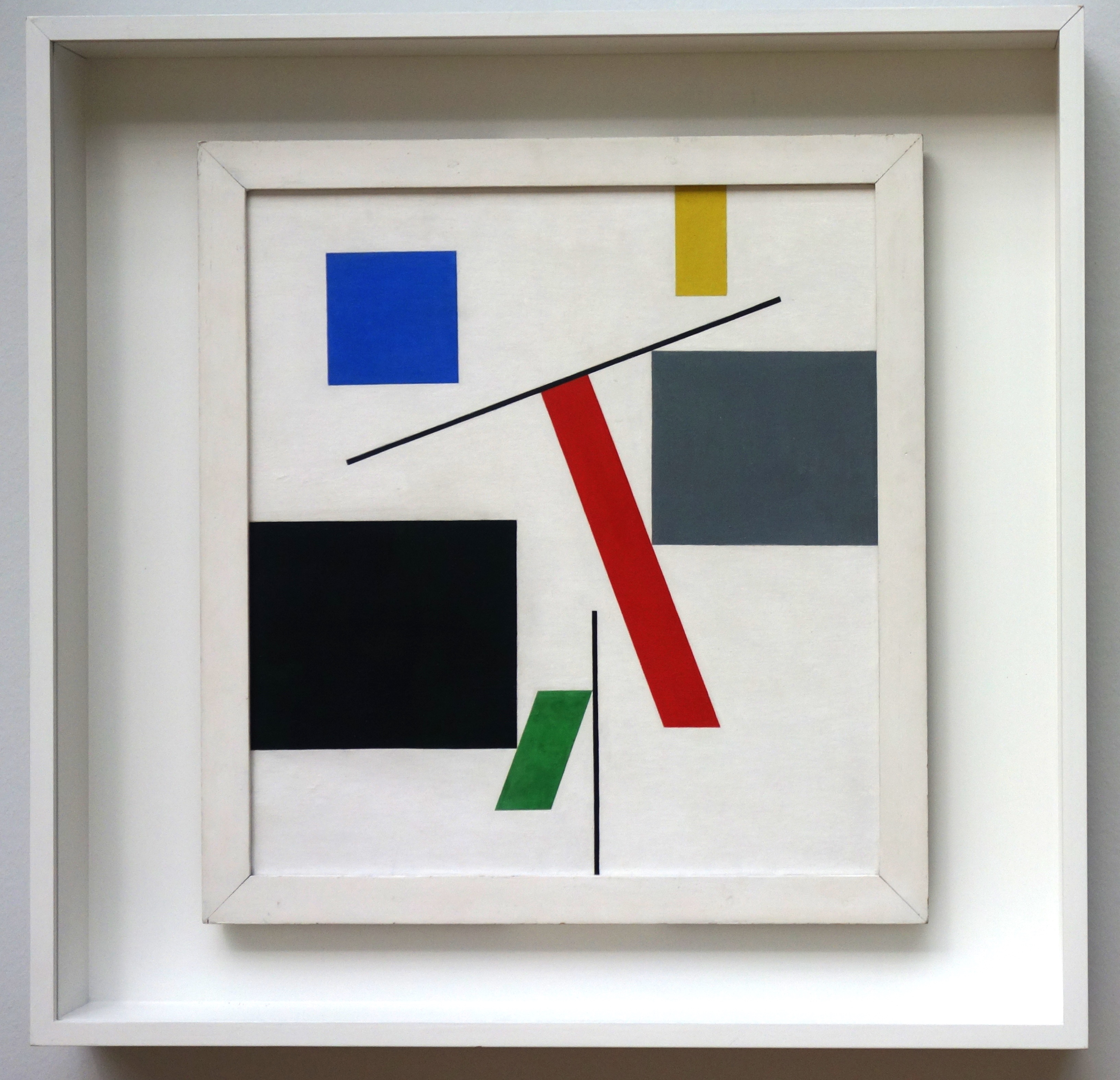
Balance, 1932–1933

== Bibliography ==
- Andreas Kotte, ed. (2005). "Sophie Taeuber-Arp". Theaterlexikon der Schweiz / Dictionnaire du théâtre en Suisse / Dizionario Teatrale Svizzero / Lexicon da teater svizzer [Theater Dictionary of Switzerland]. Vol. 3. Zürich: Chronos. pp. 1787–1788. ISBN 978-3-0340-0715-3. LCCN 2007423414. OCLC 62309181.
- Umland, Anne; Krupp, Walburga (2021). Sophie Taeuber-Arp: Living Abstraction. New York: The Museum of Modern Art. ISBN 978-1-63345-107-0.
- Sophie Taeuber-Arp 1889–1943. Catalogue of the exhibition in the Arp-Museum Bahnhof Rolandseck, at the Kunsthalle Tübingen (1993), at the Städtischen Galerie im Lenbachhaus München (1994). publisher: Siegfried Gohr, Verlag Gerd Hatje, Stuttgart, 1993. ISBN 3-7757-0419-1
- Gabriele Mahn: "Sophie Taeuber-Arp", pp. 160–168, in: Karo Dame, book on the exhibition Karo Dame. Konstruktive, Konkrete und Radikale Kunst von Frauen von 1914 bis heute, Aargauer Kunsthaus Aarau, publisher: Beat Wismer, Verlag Lars Müller, Baden, 1995. ISBN 3-906700-95-X
- Sophie Taeuber-Arp – Gestalterin, Architektin, Tänzerin. Catalogue of the exhibition at the Museum Bellerive, Zürich. publisher: Hochschule für Gestaltung und Kunst Zürich. Zürich: Scheidegger & Spiess, 2007. ISBN 978-3-85881-196-7
- Bewegung und Gleichgewicht. Sophie Taeuber-Arp 1889–1943. Book on the exhibition at the Kirchner Museum Davos and at the Arp Museum Bahnhof Rolandseck. editor: Karin Schick, Oliver Kornhoff, Astrid von Asten. Bielefeld: Kerber Verlag, 2010. ISBN 978-3-86678-320-1
- Susanne Meyer-Büser: "Zwei Netzwerkerinnen der Avantgarde in Paris um 1930. Auf den Spuren von Florence Henri und Sophie Taeuber-Arp", in: Die andere Seite des Mondes. Künstlerinnen der Avantgarde. Book on the exhibition at the Kunstsammlung Nordrhein-Westfalen, Düsseldorf (ed.), and at the Louisiana Museum of Modern Art, Humlebaek, Dänemark. Köln: DuMont Buchverlag, 2011. ISBN 978-3-8321-9391-1
- Mair, Roswitha (2018). Sophie Taeuber-Arp and the avant-garde: a biography. Chicago: The University of Chicago Press. ISBN 978-0-226-31121-0.
- Sophie Taeuber-Arp – Heute ist Morgen. Comprehensive publication on the exhibition at the Aargauer Kunsthaus, Aarau, and at the Kunsthalle Bielefeld. Editor: Thomas Schmutz und Aargauer Kunsthaus, Friedrich Meschede und Kunsthalle Bielefeld. Zürich: Verlag Scheidegger & Spiess, 2014. ISBN 978-3-85881-432-6
- West, Shearer (1996). The Bullfinch Guide to Art. UK: Bloomsbury Publishing Plc. ISBN 0-8212-2137-X.
- Schmidt, Georg, ed. (1948). Sophie Taeuber-Arp, Holbein Verlag.
- Vögele, Christoph, and Walburga Krupp (2003). Sophie Taeuber-Arp: Works on Paper, Kehrer Verlag.
