= Stable Gallery =

Art gallery in New York City

Coordinates: 40.7729°N 73.9640°W

The Stable Gallery, originally located on West 58th Street in New York City, was founded in 1953 by Eleanor Ward. The Stable Gallery hosted early solo New York exhibitions for artists including Marisol Escobar, Robert Indiana and Andy Warhol.

== History ==
The Stable Gallery, which was originally located in an old livery stable on West 58th Street in New York City, received its name from the origin of its location. Initially, the gallery sold mannequins and exhibited photography that was fashion related. Eleanor Ward had received much encouragement for her gallery from important figures such as Christian Dior, and by the mid-1950s the Stable Gallery would begin to annually host a homage exhibit to the “9th Street Art Exhibition” of 1951 where Ward would bring forth notable Abstract Expressionist artists including Willem de Kooning, Phillip Guston, Varujan Boghosian, Howard Kanovitz, Franz Kline, Nicolas Carone, Knox Martin, Robert Motherwell, Jackson Pollock, Robert Rauschenberg, Ad Reinhardt, Joop Sanders, Fritz Bultman, and Jack Tworkov to exhibit. This yearly event, which would come to be known as the "Stable Annual", was a great success for the gallery. The Stable Annuals represented what came to be known as the New York School abstract expressionists of the 1950s.

== List of artists who participated in all the Stable Annuals 1953–57 ==
- Olga Albizu (1924–2005)
- Alice Baber (1928-1982)
- William Baziotes (1912–1963)
- Gandy Brodie (1924–1975)
- James Brooks (1906–1992)
- Varujan Boghosian (1927–present)
- Louise Bourgeois (1911–2010)
- Fritz Bultman (1919–1985)
- Nicolas Carone (1917–2010)
- Giorgio Cavallon (1904–1989)
- Herman Cherry (1909–1992)
- Elaine de Kooning (1918–1989)
- Willem de Kooning (1904–1997)
- Enrico Donati (1909–2008)
- Friedel Dzubas (1915–1994)
- Fred Farr (1914–1973)
- John Ferren (1905–1970)
- Perle Fine (1908–1988)
- Helen Frankenthaler (1928–2011)
- Michael Goldberg (1924–2007)
- Robert Goodnough (1917–2010)
- Grace Hartigan (1922–2009)
- Raymond Hendler (1923–1998)
- Hans Hofmann (1880–1966)
- Angelo Ippolito (1922–2001)
- Howard Kanovitz (1929–2009)
- Earl Kerkam (1891–1965)
- Franz Kline (1910–1962)
- Albert Kotin (1907–1980)
- Lee Krasner (1908–1984)
- Ibram Lassaw (1913–2003)
- Landes Lewitin (1892–1966)
- Linda Lindeberg (1915–1973)
- Conrad Marca-Relli (1913–2000)
- Marcia Marcus (1928)
- Nicholas Marsicano (1908–1991)
- Joan Mitchell (1925–1992)
- Robert Motherwell (1915–1991)
- Ray Parker (1922–1990)
- Felix Pasilis (1922– )
- Vincent Pepi (1926–2020)
- Richard Pousette-Dart (1916–1992)
- Milton Resnick (1917–2004)
- James Rosati (1911–1988)
- Ludwig Sander (1906–1975)
- Joop Sanders (1921-)
- Louis Schanker (1903–1981)
- David Slivka (1914–2010)
- David Smith (1906–1965)
- Raymond P. Spillenger (1924–2013)
- Hedda Sterne (1910–2011)
- Yvonne Thomas (1913–2009)
- Esteban Vicente (1904–2001)
- Manoucher Yektai (1922–2019)
- Wilfrid Zogbaum (1915–1965)
- Audrey Flack (1931)

However, the first and second generation Abstract Expressionist artists began to go in their own directions, and new art movements in 1960s including Pop art would become more currently fashionable. In light of those developments Ward expanded the gallery beyond having only a permanent stable of artists, and began bringing forth artists of various movements to exhibit, including: Joseph Cornell, Varujan Boghosian, Edward Dugmore, Robert Engman, Marisol Escobar, John Ferren, Ian Hornak, Will Insley, Alex Katz, Conrad Marca-Relli, Joan Mitchell, Lowell Nesbitt, Isamu Noguchi, Larry Rivers, Leon Polk Smith, Richard Stankiewicz, Cy Twombly, Jack Tworkov, and Wilfrid Zogbaum. The Stable Gallery organized Andy Warhol’s first one-man show in November 1962, after Leo Castelli turned him down; the exhibition included eight of the 12 single images of Marilyn Monroe that came to be known as the “Flavor Marilyns,” because each had a colored background. By doing this Eleanor Ward established a reputation for the Stable Gallery as a meeting place for both great emerging and established artists of the time.

By 1960, the Stable Gallery had moved to 33 East 74th Street in New York, a location that possessed enough space for the gallery exhibition area. The building was also large enough to contain living quarters for Ward on the ground floor, opening to the garden at the rear. 1970 would mark the closure of the Stable Gallery, which came about very quickly and unexpectedly after Eleanor Ward stated that: due to the evolving commercialization of Fine Art and her personal loss of interest in what was becoming contemporary in the art world, that she would prefer to act as a private art consultant rather than operate a gallery, which she considered to have evolved into simply a business and no longer a passion.

== General references ==
- Glueck, Grace (January 7, 1984). "Eleanor Ward is dead at 72; Dealer for new U.S. artists". New York Times.
- "Stable Gallery Records". Washington D.C.: Archives of American Art, Smithsonian Institution.
- "Eleanor Ward: The Stable Gallery". Warholstars.
- P. Walsh. "Warhol Brillo Boxes". Allen Memorial Art Museum. Oberlin College.
- Marika Herskovic, New York School Abstract Expressionists Artists Choice by Artists, (New York School Press, 2000.) ISBN 0-9677994-0-6. p. 10–39
