= Vincent Pepi =

American abstract expressionist painter (1926–2020)

- Born: June 25, 1926; Boston, Massachusetts
- Died: March 12, 2020 (aged 93); Long Island, New York
- Education: Hans Hofmann
- Known for: Painting
- Movement: Abstract expressionism

Vincent Pepi (June 25, 1926 – March 12, 2020) was an abstract expressionist painter associated with the New York School. His contribution to American art includes some of the foremost examples of action painting, produced consistently over the course of the second half of the 20th century. His art parallels the works of Jackson Pollock, Willem de Kooning, Franz Kline, Conrad Marca-Relli and others. He adapted the automatic techniques of the Surrealists and transformed it into his own kind of gesture painting.

== Biography ==
Pepi studied at Cooper Union and Pratt Institute. He traveled to Africa and Mexico. In 1949 he went to Rome, Italy. This was the same time that the Abstract Expressionist movement began in New York City. Three years later, in 1951, Pepi joined with many of the innovators of Action Painting in New York City. Upon his return to the United States, Pepi studied briefly with Hans Hofmann. Along with other first generation abstract expressionists, he showed his work at the Stable Gallery in 1953 and at the March Gallery on Tenth Street, from 1955 until its closing in 1960.

Pepi attended the "Artists' Club" from time to time, but preferred his own studio and a more solitary existence. A graphics business that he created permitted him to live and paint while freeing him from the necessity of regularly exhibiting his work. His choice to live in Italy from 1949 to 1951, during a crucial time in the formation of the New York School, as well as his preference for painting in a consistently smaller format, may have obscured the recognition and fame that otherwise might have been his.

The artist's acknowledged sources range from old masters to the Futurists (especially Boccioni and Balla): from Klee and Kandinsky to Matta, Gorky and Pepi's contemporaries. His academically trained teacher in Italy, Beppe Guzzi, helped him to incorporate rigorous discipline into his painting, as well as introducing him to a number of important Italian painters and sculptors. Like Pollock and other Abstract Expressionists he admired, Pepi loved music, particularly jazz, going as far as learning to play the tenor saxophone. Color and music appeared parallel to him: the artist/ musician improvises with both. And so it follows that Pepi's own automatic painting and line poems are reminiscent of works by Paul Klee, with the latter's powerful equations of color, line and music.

Pepi defined himself as an academic artist, but one who felt he had to take that "main highway between Cézanne and Kandinsky". His paintings do indeed, reveal a Cézanne-like underpinning of abstract structure, while adopting the free improvisatory phase of Kandinsky at the same time. It is the spontaneous and uncontrived revelation of the unconscious that Pepi sought in his work.

This biography was realized from the writings of Greta Berman, art historian, Juilliard School of Music, New York.

== Books ==
- Marika Herskovic, New York School Abstract Expressionists Artists Choice by Artists, (New York School Press, 2000.) ISBN 0-9677994-0-6. p. 33; p. 38
