= Eleanor Ward =

American art dealer and gallery owner

Eleanor Ward (1911?–1984) was the founder of Stable Gallery and an art dealer.

== Career ==
Eleanor Ward fostered the impression that she was from a socially prominent family, rather than, in reality, from a middle-class family in a Pennsylvania hill town. She began her career working in advertising in New York City and, subsequently, worked for Christian Dior's fashion house in Paris. She subsequently returned to New York City and leased space at Seventh Avenue and West 58th Street in 1952 to sell mannequins and provide space for fashion photography. Utilizing the same space, Ward founded and opened the Stable Gallery in 1953.

The name of the gallery was derived from the livery stable in which it had been originally located. In 1953, her first exhibition featured the work of friend Mike Mishke, a commercial artist. Also in the gallery's inaugural year, she began hosting the New York School's annual exhibitions, formerly the 9th Street Art Exhibition due to its 1951 initial event having been at 60 East 9th Street. Commencing in 1953, five influential annuals followed (under various exhibition names such as "Second Annual Exhibition of Painting and Sculpture") to become known as the Stable Annuals, concluding in 1957. The events were curated by artists and included participation by Jackson Pollock, Willem de Kooning, Franz Kline, and Robert Motherwell.

Ward was known for showing the work of controversial and emerging artists. She curated the first solo shows of Andy Warhol, Cy Twombly, and Robert Indiana. Emile de Antonio had introduced Ward to Warhol. She also showed the work of Robert Rauschenberg, who was working as a janitor at the gallery at the time of the exhibition in 1953.

She became noted for her innovative installations such as for Joseph Cornell for which she had the gallery painted black. The Metropolitan Museum of Art's Cornell exhibition followed suit. Other landmarks included the Stable's becoming the first major gallery to recognize photography. Hans Namuth was given a one-person show in 1958. There was also a pre-Columbian sculpture venue, and the musical notations of John Cage were shown.

The gallery was eventually located on the first floor of 33 East 74th Street, with her residence in the rear of the half-basement level. Ward closed the gallery in 1970 and began to travel extensively. On January 6, 1984, Ward died in the residential Hotel Volney in New York City, where she stayed when living in New York. Sources differ about her age at the time of death.

Stories about her initial encounter with Warhol differ. In her own telling, Warhol: was brought into the gallery by de Antonio, and I immediately liked Andy as a person... the gallery was, at that time, completely booked up... but in May or June... I had to ask an artist - very prominent [in fact, Alex Katz] - to leave the gallery... He had been scheduled for an exhibition in November... but this was in June and the gallery was about to close - and I spent my summers in Connecticut then - and I decided I wasn't going to worry about it or think about it, but the right thing would happen at the right time. And I had a lovely ice house in Connecticut outside of Old Lyme - a reconverted ice house; it was enchanting... and I was out on the lawn one summer, a lazy summer afternoon, sunning, reading, and John [Bedenkapp], an old friend, an architect, was there, and I was lying there on my back, sunning, with my eyes closed, not thinking about anything in the world, and suddenly a voice said, 'Andy Warhol.' I hadn't been thinking about artists, I hadn't been thinking about the art world. I hadn't been thinking about the gallery. Everything was utterly remote. I sat up and thought, 'How extraordinary!' My guardian angel.

== Legacy ==
The Stable Gallery archives and some personal papers from Ward are included in the Archives of American Art in Washington, D.C. An audio interview of Ward, housed there, was conducted February 8, 1972, by art historian Paul Cummings (Detroit Lakes, Minn., 1933 – New York City 1993), formerly the director of the Archive's Oral History Program.
