= Joan Lazzarani =

Joan Lazzarani (born July 31, 1943, in Brighton, UK) is a sculptor, musician, intermedia performance artist and club DJ (aka DJ Glamourpussy) based in New York and London. A well known face throughout numerous Manhattan art and club ‘scenes’ since the 1960s, she remains active in various aspects of popular culture.

== Biography ==
Raised in Brighton, UK, Lazzarani moved to New York City at the age of 15 with her parents who opened and ran a successful pizzeria in Bensonhurst, Brooklyn. At age 21, Lazzarani left the family home to attend Rhode Island School Of Design in Providence where she studied interior architecture before dropping out after just one year and returning to New York City. On her return, Lazzarani rented an apartment in Manhattan while working as a hostess at the famous Satin Dolls gentlemen’s club on Times Square.

In 1964, Lazzarani met a young Lou Reed who introduced her to Andy Warhol, later to be a guiding light in her artistic career. With Warhol’s active encouragement, Lazzarani spent the remainder of the 1960s establishing herself as an avant-garde sculptor exhibiting regularly in the Stable Gallery where her notorious "The Despair Of Eve" exhibit almost forced the closure of the gallery by the New York Police Department after numerous complaints from gallery patrons. With the curators of the gallery agreeing to remove the piece immediately, Lazzarani staged her own protest against this perceived censorship in the following days by standing outside the main doors of The Stable, handcuffed, with an onion sack over her head and a placard round her neck saying ‘Prisoner Of Conscience’. The protest made the pages of numerous New York newspapers and art sheets.

While continuing to sculpt and exhibit on a regular basis during the 1970s, Lazzarani became more interested in the performing arts and in particular music. A proficient piano player since childhood, Lazzarani played keyboards in The Artistics, an early incarnation of Talking Heads, and joined The Patti Smith Group on stage on numerous occasions at CBGB’s (where she supplemented her earnings by working as an occasional bartender). During the same period, Lazzarani became an important member of the Fluxus collective and engaged in numerous experimental music, sculpting and intermedia projects.

Lazzarani remained in Manhattan until 1980 and continued to be an influential member of the New York scene, working variously as a door picker at Xenon nightclub, a DJ at Ruza Blue and Fab Five Freddie’s Negril club night and as artist in residence at The Camera Club gallery.

Lazzarani returned to the UK in early 1980 with her British husband where she raised a family and adopted a more conventional lifestyle although her influence on the New York arts and music scene remains and can still be seen to this day.

=== Recent career ===
In June 2007, Lazzarani moved back to Manhattan following her divorce and began to exhibit again for the first time in over 30 years. As well as the challenging sculptures that Lazzarani has become known for, she also started to produce illustrations, screenprints and canvas art. Her work has been displayed in various locations including Brooklyn’s BRIC and the prestigious Bronx River Art Centre.
