= Day Schnabel =

- Born: 1905; Vienna
- Died: 1991 (aged 85–86)
- Known for: Sculpture
- Movement: Abstract Expressionism abstract sculpture, easel painting, murals

Day Schnabel (1905-1991) was an Austrian sculptor and painter. Born in Vienna, Austria, she lived in the Netherlands for about three years before 1932, and in New York City during World War II and after, during which she became an Irascible.

Her mediums included welded steel, bronze, brass, marble, limestone, granite, cast stone, relief mural, found objects* (car parts), wood, plaster, cement, copper, Plexiglas, gouache*, ink, charcoal, chalk, pastel, crayon, pencil, and mixed mediums.

She died in Paris.
