= The Irascibles =

Group of American abstract artists

The Irascibles or Irascible 18 were the labels given to a group of American abstract artists who put name to an open letter, written in 1950, to the president of the Metropolitan Museum of Art, rejecting the museum's exhibition American Painting Today - 1950 and boycotting the accompanying competition. The subsequent media coverage of the protest and a now iconic group photograph that appeared in Life magazine gave them notoriety, popularized the term Abstract Expressionist and established them as the so-called first generation of the putative movement.

== The emergence of the New York School ==
The emergence of abstract art coincided with the invention of Cubism in Paris in the first decade of the 20th century. Paris remained the centre of gravity for later art movements like Futurism, Purism, Vorticism, Cubo-Futurism, Dada, Constructivism and Surrealism until the outbreak of World War II and the Nazi persecution of "degenerate art", which precipitated a mass migration of artists and performers to the United States, further advanced by the 1940 Nazi occupation of France. New York became home to the transplanted avant-garde.

The early 1940s was of particular importance in American art as American scene painting (Regionalism) came to be seen as an inadequate mode of artistic expression in a tumultuous time. In 1942, Peggy Guggenheim, who had fled Europe with her husband, Surrealist artist Max Ernst, opened her gallery Art of This Century, showing European and promising American avant-garde artists. Jackson Pollock had his first one-man show there in 1943 and, in 1945, Guggenheim showed Mark Rothko.

When Guggenheim closed her gallery in 1947 to move to Venice, artists like Pollock had to find new representation. The Betty Parsons Gallery, which opened the previous year, began representing Pollock, Barnett Newman, Mark Rothko and Clyfford Still. Parsons was already representing Adolph Gottlieb, Hedda Sterne and Theodoros Stamos. It was while Pollock showed at Parsons' gallery that he started making his iconic drip-paintings in 1947. It was also here that Barnett Newman exhibited his first breakthrough works in 1950. Rothko, who had arrived at his distinctive mural sized paintings in 1947, first exhibited them at the Parsons Gallery.

At the time, the only galleries who were prepared to show the so-called New York School (Robert Motherwell's term) were Parsons Gallery, the Samuel Kootz Gallery and the Charles Egan Gallery. To these fledgling galleries it was a financial disaster. The highest price paid for a Pollock, before 1947, was $740 and Rothko had peaked with the sale of a $120 painting in 1946. At the Kootz Gallery, from 1946 to 1948, Hans Hofmann, William Baziotes and Robert Motherwell were offered at between $100 and $950, likely fetching much lower actual sales prices. Kootz closed in 1948 as a result of the financial strain. The critical and financial success of the group would only come after a series of popularising articles in Life magazine, most notably a feature on Jackson Pollock in 1949 and the Irascibles article and photograph of 1951.

== Preamble to the protest ==
Since January 1943 an agreement existed between the Whitney Museum of American Art and the Metropolitan Museum of Art on a coalition which would culminate in the combining of their collections of American art in a new building, paid for from the endowment of Gertrude Vanderbilt Whitney. By this unwritten agreement, the Whitney acquired American art while the Metropolitan concentrated their acquisitions on what they termed "classic" art.

Juliana Force, the Whitney's director since 1931 until her death on August 28, 1948, harboured grave concerns and advocated the abandonment of the coalition. On October 1, 1948, the Whitney trustees cited "serious divergences" especially with regard to the showing of advanced trends in art, something the Whitney made a special point of doing. They unilaterally withdrew the Whitney from the coalition.

On December 6, 1948, the Met announced it would form its own Department of American Art, which it did on January 1, 1949. Robert Beverly Hale was appointed as Associate Curator of American Painting and Sculpture and head of the department. A Trustees' Committee on American Art was set up to advise the Associate Curator. The members of this committee were Elihu Root, Jr., Chairman, Walter C. Baker, and Sam A. Lewisohn. Lewisohn, although a highly respected collector of Impressionists, was noted for calling avant-garde abstract art "unhuman".

In July 1949, Roland J. McKinney, formerly Director of the Baltimore Museum of Art and of the Los Angeles County Museum of Art, was appointed as a consultant. On his advice, it was decided The Met would host a series of open national competitive exhibitions with five regional juries. The first of these, American Painting Today - 1950, was announced as part of a statement of policy on January 1, 1950.

The five regional juries, meeting respectively in Santa Barbara, Dallas, Chicago, Richmond and New York would make selections, which would be submitted to a National Jury, composed of five regional jurors and two jurors appointment by the Metropolitan.

== Subjects of the Artist School ==
In 1948, William Baziotes, Barnett Newman, David Hare, Robert Motherwell and Mark Rothko founded the Subjects of the Artist School at 35 East 8th Street. Well-attended lectures were open to the public with speakers such as Jean Arp, John Cage and Ad Reinhardt. The school failed financially and closed in the spring of 1949. The school had no admission requirements. Its catalogue stated that "...the school is for anyone who wishes to reach beyond conventional modes of expression." The school was taken over by New York University and was renamed Studio 35. A closed panel symposium took place there from April 21 to 23, 1950. It was organised by Robert Goodnough and moderated by Richard Lippold, Robert Motherwell and Alfred H. Barr, Jr. director of the Museum of Modern Art (MoMA). The purpose was the framing of an art movement. At the end of the closed session it was suggested by Adolph Gottlieb that the assembled artists protest the conservative bias of the jury for the upcoming competition at the Metropolitan.

== The open letter ==
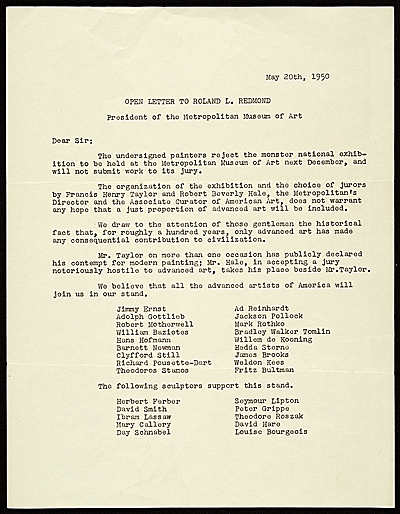
Open letter to Roland L. Redmond, May 20, 1950, unsigned copy from the Hedda Sterne papers, typed, 28 x 22 cm

Gottlieb spent the better part of three weeks drafting an open letter to the president of the Metropolitan, conferring with Ad Reinhardt and Barnett Newman while soliciting consensus among other artists by mail or phone. The final version was sent to the individual artists to sign; 28 doing so. Newman called Jackson Pollock from Gottlieb's apartment in Brooklyn, asking him to come into the city immediately to sign the letter. Pollock sent a telegram instead:

I ENDORSED THE LETTER OPPOSING THE METROPOLITAN MUSEUM OF ART 1950 JURIED SHOW STOP JACKSON POLLOCK

The letter was underwritten by Jimmy Ernst, Adolph Gottlieb, Robert Motherwell, William Baziotes, Hans Hofmann, Barnett Newman, Clyfford Still, Richard Pousette-Dart, Theodoros Stamos, Ad Reinhardt, Jackson Pollock, Mark Rothko, Bradley Walker Tomlin, Willem de Kooning, Hedda Sterne, James Brooks, Weldon Kees and Fritz Bultman. The supporting sculptors were Herbert Ferber, David Smith, Ibram Lassaw, Mary Callery, Day Schnabel, Seymour Lipton, Peter Grippe, Theodore Roszak, David Hare and Louise Bourgeois.

On Sunday May 21, 1950, Barnett Newman took the signed statement to the city editor of the New York Times. He had run for mayor of New York as a write-in candidate in 1933 and knew Monday to be a slow news day at the Times. The statement, entitled OPEN LETTER TO ROLAND L. REDMOND, dated May 20, appeared on the front page of the Times of May 22.

Newman told the Times that they were critical of the membership of the five regional juries and especially opposed to the New York jury, the National Jury of Selection and the Jury of Awards. The New York jurors were Charles Burchfield, Yasuo Kuniyoshi, Leon Kroll, Ogden Pleissner, Vaclav Vytlacil and Paul Sample. The national jury consisted of Robert Beverly Hale, Ogden Pleissner, Maurice Sterne, Millard Sheets, Howard Cook, Lamar Dodd, Francis Chapin, Zoltan Sepeshy and Esther Williams. The jury of awards included William M. Milliken, Franklin C. Watkins and Eugene Speicher.

== Resulting polemic ==
The first response to the letter came on the editorial page of The Herald Tribune of May 23, 1950. The editorial attacked the artists for "distortion of fact" in claiming the Metropolitan had "contempt" for modern painting. The Herald Tribune's art critic at the time was Emily Genauer. It was widely assumed that she had written the editorial, which gave name to the group.

Gottlieb, aided by Newman and Reinhardt, drafted a rebuttal, which was signed by 12 painters and three sculptors, and addressed to the editor of the Tribune. It was never published. Weldon Kees discussed the issue of the open letter further in the June 5 edition of The Nation, calling director of the Metropolitan Museum of Art, Francis Henry Taylor a philistine. Two days later Time magazine noted the protest in an article entitled The Revolt of the Pelicans, an oblique reference to Taylor's 1948 comments in the Atlantic Monthly.

Instead of soaring like an eagle through the heavens as did his ancestors ... the contemporary artist has been reduced to the status of a flat-chested pelican, strutting upon the intellectual wastelands and beaches, content to take whatever nourishment he can from his own too meager breast.

— Francis Henry Taylor, Atlantic Monthly, December 1948

Alfred Barr, seeking to distinguish the MoMA, further electrified the situation by selecting Arshile Gorky, Willem de Kooning and Jackson Pollock for the American pavilion of the 25th Venice Biennale, held from June to October 1950. In the June 1950 issue of ARTnews, he referred to the painters as "leaders" of a "predominant vanguard". Barr's act signalled to the art world that abstract expressionism should be given serious consideration by museums.

On July 3, 1950, a group of 75 artists issued a statement via an open letter to the president of the Met, defending the museum. Signers included Milton Avery, Will Barnet, Philip Evergood, Xavier Gonzalez, George Grosz, Henry Koerner, Reginald Marsh, Waldo Peirce, Manfred Schwartz and Harry Sternberg.

== Life photograph ==
Life magazine decided to publish a photo story for their January 15, 1951 edition, which would document the results of the competition and feature a photograph of the protesters. Life initially wanted to photograph the painters on the steps of the Metropolitan, with their paintings. They refused on the grounds that it would look like they were trying to enter the museum, but were being rebuffed. The magazine capitulated; art editor for Life, Dorothy Seiberling, sent photographer Nina Leen to photograph them at a studio on 44th Street. They assembled there on November 24, with only three of the original signatories being absent: Weldon Kees, Hans Hofmann, and Fritz Bultman. Pollock made a special trip with James Brooks for the session.

Leen took twelve pictures, of which one appeared in Life. Barnett Newman had insisted that the group be photographed "like bankers". The artists were allowed to position themselves. Hedda Sterne, who had arrived late, is seen in the back (standing on a table). The only woman in the photograph, she would later describe the experience as "probably the worst thing that happened to me". “I am known more for that darn photo than for eighty years of work,” Sterne said a few years before she died. “If I had an ego, it would bother me.” What's more, she said, “it is a lie ... I was not an Abstract Expressionist. Nor was I an Irascible.” Painter Lee Krasner believed Sterne was allowed at the insistence of art dealer Betty Parsons, who represented many in the group.

They all were very furious that I was in it because they all were sufficiently macho to think that the presence of a woman took away from the seriousness of it all.

— Hedda Sterne, Interview with Phyllis Tuchman, 1981

The caption to the published photograph referred to the group as solemn. It was true that many of the group had reservations at appearing in a mainstream media publication; Rothko especially. Yet none could have mistaken the consequences of Pollock's three-page spread in Life of August 8, 1949. Pollock's next show, opening November 21, 1949, at Betty Parsons Gallery, was an unmistakable triumph. Famously, Willem de Kooning was heard to say to Milton Resnick: "Look around. These are the big shots. Jackson has finally broken the ice." In the ensuing year, Betty Parsons sent Pollock checks totalling $6,508.23 on gross sales of over $10,000, at a time when more than two-thirds of American families lived on less than $4,000 per year. Pollock seems to have been invited to sign the Studio 35 open letter, at least in part, because of his notoriety, almost entirely attributable to the Life article. In the end the sitting was an uncomfortable accommodation between the system of values under which the artists had laboured and their desire for career success.

I think they loved having their pictures taken, but they seemed to be afraid to be nice - they didn't want to appear too commercial.

— Nina Leen, Vogue, November 1985

== The legacy of the polemic ==
The subsequent Life article did more than provide the public with an image of the group, looking more "like bankers" than irascible. It placed the picture larger and before the pictures of the Metropolitans competition winning art works. It also reiterated the word advanced, echoing the Madison Avenue advertising speak of the day. The picture caption also referred to the protest as in keeping with avant-garde tradition, mentioning the Salon des Refusés of 1863 and the Ashcan School.

Irving Sandler, a historian of the New York School and Abstract Expressionism wrote that the Leen photograph "has become the image whereby we envision the artists who achieved the triumph of American painting".

The artists' discomfort with being labelled, individually or as a group, was clear. At the end of the three-day symposium at Studio 35 in 1950, Alfred Barr challenged the group to name themselves, to which de Kooning responded: "it is disastrous to name ourselves". Pollock, on his part, refused to sign the Times letter unless it was clear that they were not a group; it is noteworthy that he did not.

Despite their subsequent labels as Abstract Expressionist, action painters and so forth, this is a picture of a group that never was a group, a picture of fifteen individuals, unified only by the click of a camera at a particular time and place.

— B. H. Friedman, Arts, September 1978

Already in 1951, relationships had deteriorated enough for Pollock, Newman, Still and Rothko to approach Betty Parsons with the idea of showing them exclusively, effectively leaving their erstwhile colleagues to fend for themselves. She declined the offer. Over the following three years Pollock, Still and Rothko moved to the Sidney Janis Gallery. After the failure of fellow artists to defend his show at Betty Parsons in 1951 and not being included in the 1952 Fifteen Americans show at the Museum of Modern Art, Newman did not show in New York again until 1959.

In 1954, Ad Reinhardt engaged in a public ridiculing of Rothko, Newman, de Kooning, Gottlieb and Still, resulting in Newman suing him for libel. Clyfford Still repudiated Mark Rothko for "living an evil, an untrue life". "It all went from love to hate in four years", Betty Parsons recalled in 1975.

Nina Leen's 1951 Life photograph has become the touchstone for canonical lists of the New York School. Irving Sandler used it as the frontispiece and rear dust jacket photograph of his The Triumph of American Painting: A History of Abstract Expressionism, published in 1970. This book defined Abstract Expressionism for a generation of scholars.
