= Fritz Bultman =

American abstract expressionist painter, sculptor, and collagist

- Fritz Bultman in 1949 with his painting Acteon
- Born: April 4, 1919; New Orleans, Louisiana
- Died: July 20, 1985 (aged 66); Provincetown, Massachusetts
- Known for: Abstract painting
- Movement: Abstract expressionism
- Awards: Fulbright Scholarship

Fritz Bultman (April 4, 1919 – July 20, 1985) was an American abstract expressionist painter, sculptor, and collagist and a member of the New York School of artists.

== Biography ==
A. Fred Bultman was the second child and only son of A. Fred and Pauline Bultman. His family was prominent in New Orleans, where his father owned a Catholic funeral company. By the age of thirteen he was interested in art, and worked with Morris Graves, who was a family friend. As a high school junior in 1935 Fritz went to study in Munich for two years, and there boarded with Maria Hofmann, the wife of artist and teacher Hans Hofmann. After returning to the United States he studied with Hofmann in New York City and Provincetown, Massachusetts. Despite his father's wishes that he become an architect, with Hofmann's encouragement he decided instead to continue his study of art. In 1944 he bought a house in Provincetown, and thenceforth Bultman and his wife Jeanne divided their time between Cape Cod and New York City.

His early paintings have been described as "rough and painterly", an amalgam of symbolism and geometry.

Bultman was exhibiting with other abstract expressionists by the late 1940s, and in 1950 was aligned with the group of New York School artists, nicknamed the "Irascibles" in an article in Life magazine, who signed a letter to the Metropolitan Museum of Art protesting the institution's conservative policies. With the assistance of a grant from Italy he studied bronze casting in Florence in 1951; subsequently he was the sole abstract expressionist to fully integrate sculpture into his oeuvre.

Affected by anxiety and depression, Bultman worked little between 1952 and 1956, and resumed painting and sculpting after undergoing Freudian analysis. At a time when African Americans were prohibited from visiting white museums in the south, in 1963 Bultman and his wife led a group of prominent New York artists and writers in the creation of a collection of modern art for Tougaloo College, a black institution in Jackson, Mississippi. Bultman was awarded a Fulbright Scholarship in 1964‍–‍65 to work in Paris. In the 1960s Bultman began to make large collages, using pre-painted paper cut or torn and assembled into shapes reminiscent of his figurative drawings and more abstract sexual symbolism. In 1976 he started making stained glass windows with the aid of his wife. Bultman died of cancer in 1985.

== Assessment ==
To Robert Motherwell, Bultman was "one of the most splendid, radiant and inspired painters of my generation.", and David Houston, curator of the Ogden Museum of Southern Art in New Orleans called him "an important artist from the South who was part of that great moment that changed the American cultural landscape."

It has been suggested that Bultman's career and subsequent reputation suffered from the vagaries of chance: he was not available for inclusion in the now iconic photo shoot for Life magazine that helped establish the reputations of the New York School painters; another possibility, according to Motherwell, was Bultman's lack of interest in "art world politics".
