= Edward Dugmore =

American painter

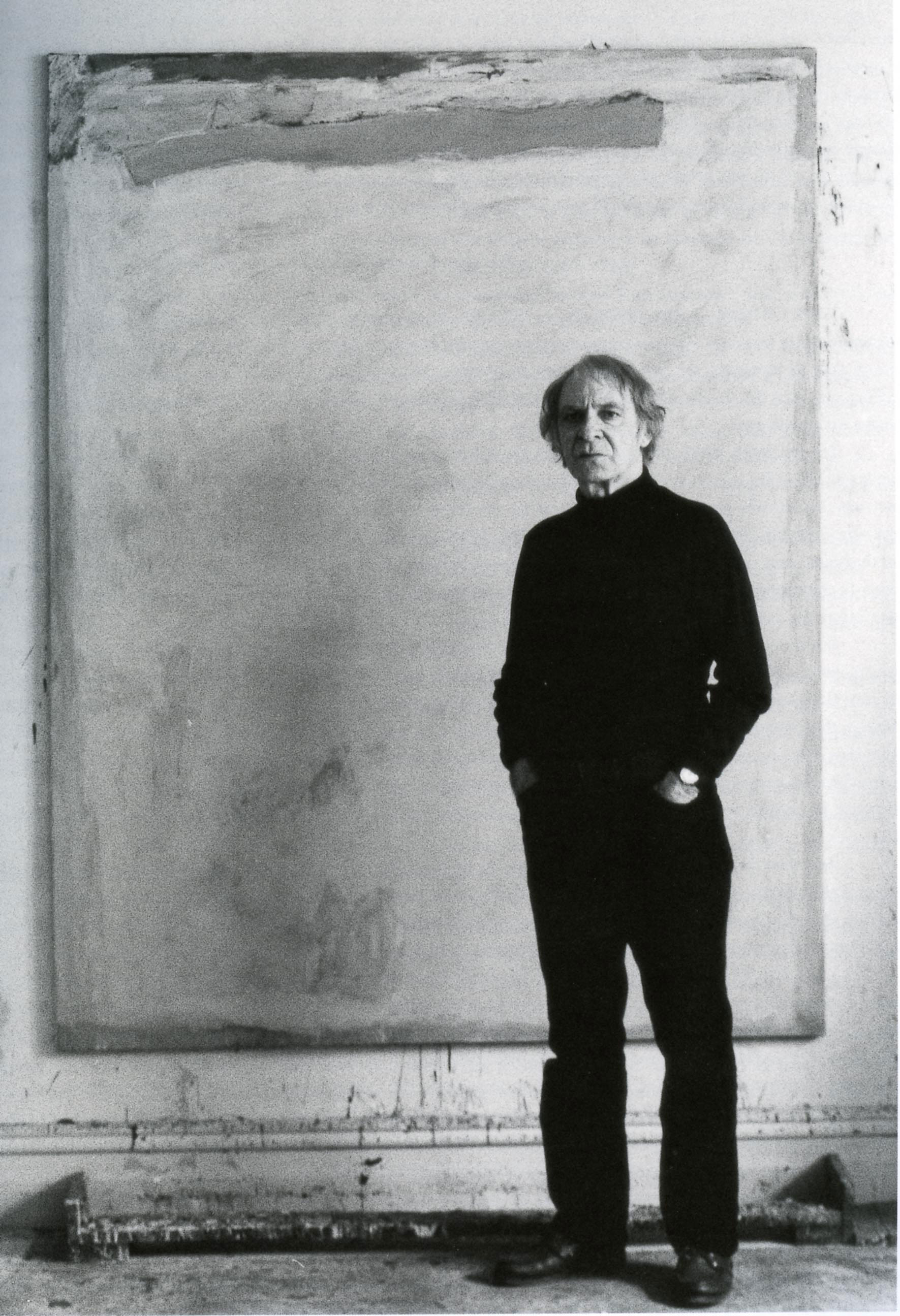
Edward Dugmore in his studio, New York City, c. 1983

Edward Dugmore (February 20, 1915 – June 13, 1996) was an American abstract expressionist painter with close ties to both the San Francisco and New York art worlds in the post-war era following World War II. Since 1950 he had more than two dozen solo exhibitions of his paintings in galleries across the United States. His paintings have been seen in hundreds of group exhibitions over the years.

== Biography ==
Edward Dugmore was born in Hartford, Connecticut, on February 20, 1915. He underwent traditional art training at the Hartford Art School before going to Kansas City in the summer of 1941 to study with Thomas Hart Benton at the Kansas City Art Institute. He entered the Marine Corps in 1943, and upon his discharge, taught painting and drawing at St. Joseph's College in West Hartford, Connecticut. In 1948, Dugmore took advantage of the G.I. Bill and moved out west to San Francisco to further his studies in art at the California School of Fine Arts. There he studied with Clyfford Still, who was influential on his development, both as an artist and a close friend. Dugmore also became a lifelong friend of fellow student and artist Ernest Briggs. During this time, he co-organized an artists collaborative gallery called the Metart Gallery. In 1951 he moved to Guadalajara, Mexico to study at the University of Guadalajara, where he received his M.F.A. He moved to New York City in 1952 and began exhibiting along with other Abstract Expressionist artists at the Stable Gallery, where he subsequently had three solo exhibitions.

His paintings have been in exhibitions in important museums, institutions and art galleries over the course of eight decades beginning in the 1940s. Some of the museums and institutions in which his paintings have been seen include: Ball State University Museum of Art, Muncie, Indiana; Greenville County Museum of Art, Greenville, South Carolina; Loyola University Museum of Art, Chicago, Worcester Art Museum, Worcester, Massachusetts; The Cleveland Museum of Art, Cleveland, Ohio, Amon Carter Museum, Fort Worth, Texas; Mary and Leigh Block Museum of Art, Northwestern University, Evanston, Illinois, The Corcoran Gallery of Art, Washington, DC; the New School for Social Research, New York, New York; The Portland Museum of Art, Portland, Oregon, Nora Eccles Harrison Museum of Art, Utah State University, Logan, Utah; Hirshhorn Museum and Sculpture Garden, Washington, D.C.; San Francisco Museum of Modern Art, San Francisco, California; American Academy and Institute of Arts and Letters; New York University, New York, New York, Smithsonian Institution, Washington, D.C.; Oakland Museum of California, Oakland, California; Albright-Knox Art Gallery, Buffalo, New York; The Kansas City Art Institute; The Hudson River Museum, Yonkers, New York; Walker Art Center, Minneapolis, Minnesota; Whitney Museum of American Art, New York, New York; The Solomon R. Guggenheim Museum, New York, New York; Art Institute of Chicago, Chicago, Illinois; Musee A. Lecuyr, Saint-Quentin, France (organized by MoMA); among others.

His work is in the permanent collection of several prominent museums including the Albright-Knox Art Gallery in Buffalo, the Corcoran Gallery in Washington D.C., the Hirshhorn Museum and Sculpture Garden in Washington, D.C., the Walker Art Center in Minneapolis, and the Menil Collection in Houston.

Dugmore received a Guggenheim Fellowship in 1966, National Endowment for the Arts grants in 1976 and 1985, and the Pollock-Krasner Foundation Lifetime Achievement Award in 1995. In 1992 he was elected into the National Academy of Design as an Associate member, and became a full Academician in 1994.

Edward Dugmore died June 13, 1996, in Minneapolis, Minnesota.

== Chronology ==
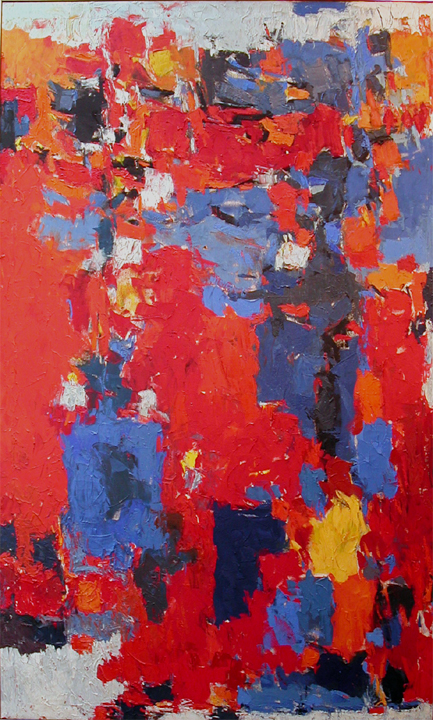
Untitled, 1954, Oil on canvas, 84 x 51 inches

=== Solo exhibitions ===
- 2014 – Ancient Evenings, Loretta Howard Gallery, New York, New York
- 2006 – Three Monumental Paintings, Manny Silverman Gallery, Los Angeles, California
- 2003 – Selected Works: Mostly from the 1960s, Manny Silverman Gallery, Los Angeles, California
- 2000 – Selected Works: 1956–1969, Manny Silverman Gallery, Los Angeles, California
- 1998 -The Passionate Eye, Joseloff Gallery, University of Hartford, Hartford, Connecticut
- 1997 – Lennon, Weinberg, New York, New York
- 1996 – Rena Bransten Gallery, San Francisco, California
- 1994 – A Survey of Works on Paper, Manny Silverman Gallery, Los Angeles, California
- 1992 – Paintings of the 1960s, Manny Silverman Gallery, Los Angeles, California
- 1991 – Anita Shapolsky Gallery, New York, New York
- 1991 – Burning Bright, Paintings 1950–1959, Manny Silverman Gallery, Los Angeles, California
- 1990 – The Carlson Gallery, San Francisco, California
- 1975 – H. Marc Moyens, Alexandria, Virginia
- 1973 – Green Mountain Gallery, New York, New York
- 1972 – Des Moines Art Center, Des Moines, Iowa
- 1965 – M.I.A. Gallery, Great Falls, Montana
- 1965 – Town Wharf Gallery, Blue Hill, Maine
- 1963 – Howard Wise Gallery, New York, New York
- 1961 – Howard Wise Gallery, New York, New York
- 1960 – Howard Wise Gallery, Cleveland, Ohio
- 1959 – Holland-Goldowsky Gallery, Chicago, Illinois
- 1956 – Stable Gallery, New York, New York
- 1954 – Stable Gallery, New York, New York
- 1953 – Sheldon Street Studio, Hartford, Connecticut
- 1953 – Stable Gallery, New York, New York
- 1950 – Metart Gallery, San Francisco, California

== Selected public collections ==
- Albright-Knox Art Gallery, Buffalo, New York
- Ciba-Geigy Corporation, Ardsley, New York
- Civic Museum and Gallery, Udine, Italy
- Corcoran Gallery, Washington, D.C.
- Des Moines Art Center, Des Moines, Iowa
- Hirshhorn Museum and Sculpture Garden, Washington, DC
- Housatonic Community College, Stratford, Connecticut
- Kresge Art Center, East Lansing, Michigan
- Laguna Beach Museum, Laguna Beach, California
- The Menil Collection, Houston, Texas
- Portland Art Museum, Portland, Oregon
- San Jose Museum of Art, San Jose, California
- University of Guadalajara, Mexico
- University of Southern Illinois, Carbondale, Illinois
- Walker Art Center, Minneapolis, Minnesota
- Weatherspoon Art Gallery, Greensboro, North Carolina
- Worcester Art Museum, Worcester, Massachusetts

== Awards ==
- 1995 – Pollock-Krasner Foundation (Lifetime Achievement Award)
- 1992 – Ingram Merrill Foundation (Lifetime Achievement Award)
- 1985 – National Endowment for the Arts Grant
- 1980 – American Academy and Institute of Arts and Letters Award
- 1976 – National Endowment for the Arts Grant
- 1966 – John Simon Guggenheim Fellowship
- 1962 – M.V. Kohnstamm Award, 65th Annual, Art Institute of Chicago

=== Teaching ===
- 1973–82 – Part-time instructor of painting at Maryland Institute, College of Art, Baltimore, Maryland
- 1972 – Visiting artist, Des Moines Art Center and Drake University, Iowa
- 1970 – Visiting artist, University of Minnesota, Minneapolis
- 1965 – Artist-in-residence at the Montana Institute of Fine Arts under the Auspices of The American Federation of Arts, Great Falls, Montana
- 1964 – 1972 – Part-time instructor of painting at Pratt Institute, Brooklyn, New York
- 1961 – 1962 – Visiting artist, University of Southern Illinois, Carbondale, Illinois
- 1946 – 1949 – Teacher of painting and drawing, St. Joseph's College, West Hartford, Connecticut

== Bibliography ==
April Kingsley Suitcase Paintings, Small Scale Abstract Expressionism Georgia Museum of Art, 2007, page 56, plate 41

Marika Herskovic, American Abstract Expressionism of the 1950s An Illustrated Survey, (New York School Press, 2003.) ISBN 0-9677994-1-4. pp. 110–113

Marika Herskovic, New York School Abstract Expressionists Artists Choice by Artists, (New York School Press, 2000.) ISBN 0-9677994-0-6. p. 31; p. 36; pp. 118–121

Nicholas Fox Weber, essay The Passionate Eye – Paintings by Edward Dugmore, published by the Joseloff Gallery, Hartford Art School, 1998

Susan Landauer The San Francisco School of Abstract Expressionism, Laguna Art Museum, 1996

Stuart Shedletsky Still Working: Underknown Artists of Age in America, Parsons School of Design, 1994

Dore Ashton, essay Edward Dugmore, Burning Bright: Paintings 1950–1959, published by Manny Silverman Gallery, 1991

Irving Sandler The Triumph of American Painting: A History of Abstract Expressionism, Harper and Row, 1970
