= Howard Kanovitz =

American artist (1929–2009)

Howard Kanovitz (February 9, 1929 – February 2, 2009) was a pioneering painter in the Photorealist and Hyperrealist Movements, which emerged in the 1960s and 1970s in response to the abstract art movement.

Howard Kanovitz. Visible Difference, Lithograph on Paper, Smithsonian American Art Museum, 1980

Howard Kanovitz, whose 50-year career ranged from abstract expressionism to computer imaging, was at the forefront of the art movement known as photorealism. His 1966 landmark Jewish Museum solo exhibition launched this new genre of photo-based painting. Though dubbed by Barbara Rose “the grandfather of photorealism”, Kanovitz’s work transcended that classification in “realistic paintings for which the concept of realism is too narrow.” The preeminent art historian Sam Hunter described how Kanovitz’s “meticulous airbrush technique and exactness of vision produce an atmosphere of doubt rather than certitude and posed questions of meaning which challenge the very nature of the artistic experience.”

== Life ==
After moving to New York City in the 1950s Kanovitz worked as the assistant to Franz Kline. He quickly became part of the downtown abstract expressionist scene, exhibiting works at the fabled Tenth Street galleries, the Tanager and Hansa, and in the Stable Gallery annuals, where he had his first one-man show in 1962.

Even during the years when Kanovitz was receiving laudatory reviews for his abstract work, Kanovitz always painted privately with an interest in the figure and new ways to explore the illusion of form in space on a flat canvas. In 1963 after the death of his father, while poring over family photographs, Kanovitz had a Roland Barthes-like, punctum moment, that solidified his interest in the nature of representation and the complex relationship between subjectivity, meaning, and memory. He began using photographs as source material, either appropriated from the media or taken himself. In 1972, the Americans Chuck Close, Richard Estees, and Howard Kanovitz were chosen to join Europeans Gerhard Richter, Sigmar Polke, Malcolm Morley, and Franz Gertsch, in Harald Szeemann’s groundbreaking international art exposition documenta V, held in Kassel Germany, as the pre-eminent exponents of this new photo based painting. He also represented America in documenta VI, 1977.

In 1979 Kanovitz was awarded the prestigious DAAD fellowship to live and work in Berlin, where he had a mid-career retrospective of over 200 works at the Akademie der Künste, which then traveled to the Kestner Society, Hannover. He taught at the Salzburger Summer Art School, founded by Oscar Kokoschka, as well as at the School of Visual Arts in New York, and took on stage design projects in both America and Germany. In addition to the three one person museum exhibitions already cited, and one at Museum of Contemporary Art in Utrecht, Kanovitz had more than fifty one person gallery exhibitions including the Waddell, Stefanotty, Alex Rosenberg, and Marlborough galleries in New York, the Gana Art Gallery in Seoul Korea, and the Jollenbeck, Inge Baecker and Ulrig Gering Gallery in Germany where he had his last one person show in 2008, one year before he died. He participated in over 100 group shows in America and Europe.
