= Je t'aime No. IV =

Painting by Robert Motherwell

Je t'aime No. IV is a part of Robert Motherwell’s Je t'aime series, dating from 1955 to 1957. The medium for the painting is oil and charcoal on canvas, and the dimensions are 70 1/8 inches by 100 inches. It is an example of Abstract Expressionism, which is a style originated in the 1940s and 1950s in New York in which the artist expresses themselves through unidentifiable forms and through spontaneous acts of creating art.

== Description ==
In this painting there is a definite focus on large areas of bold color. There is hardly any mixing of colors except for a little red/white, blue/white, and black/white. In the background there are large blocks of canvas painted with the warm colors red, tan, yellow, and orange. On top of that there are random areas covered with blue, red, and tan. On top of that are the colors, white, yellow, and tan. The only piece of this painting that appears to represent any kind of form is the word “Je t'aime”, which is French for “I love you.” These drastic color differences go along with Motherwell’s “push and pull” concept that all movement within a painting necessarily implies a reciprocal movement in the opposing direction. Many people have suspected that Motherwell was in love at the time that he created this piece. However, he actually created the Je t'aime paintings while he was going through a divorce with his second wife. So instead of creating the paintings because he was in love, he created the paintings because he had “a need for love." H. H. Arnason goes on to say that, “Motherwell is unquestionably a romantic whose works are an intense if generalized reflection of his day-to-day life, his innermost emotions, his passionate involvement with art and the world in which he lives.” Along with his longing for love, Motherwell also has a specific technique that he used in Je t'aime. He would first trace what he wanted to draw, make changes and then paint it. This is a technique that Motherwell used in most of his paintings, and if looked at closely the viewer can see the tracing marks behind the paint. Also most of Motherwell’s paintings are considered collages. Arnason states that “these paintings retain definite aspects of the geometric cut-out shapes of the collages.” This technique can also be seen in his other work. Even though Motherwell used the same technique in his paintings, the one major difference between this work and all his other paintings is color. In his work before and after the Je t'aime series, Motherwell would mainly use either or black and white. For example, before the Je t'aime series he created Elegy to the Spanish Republic XXXIV in 1953-1954: although this painting does have a background showing a little bit of color, he covered the entire background with black shaped bars and ovals, making the color very minimal. In addition to his work before the Je t'aime series, his paintings after this series goes back to mainly using black as the color in his painting. An example would be his painting Totemic Figure, which was created in 1958-1960. This painting shows Motherwell’s use of brushwork to create a black form on the canvas. But instead of using black to cover the background, in Je t'aime No. IV he uses multiple colors that overlap on one another. Arnason expounds on this difference by stating that “the important difference lies in the sheer, expressionist exuberance of the calligraphy and in the degree to which the surface, with all its brilliant color variations, is unified by the sensuous impasto of the brushwork.” Along with his different use of color in his paintings, there is also a progression of Motherwell’s artistic style, which can be seen through his Je t'aime series. In Je t'aime No. II, he mainly uses warm colors, few forms and harsh brushwork to express his longing for love. In Je t'aime No. IV he starts to include more overlapping forms and cool colors. Finally in Je t'aime No. VIII Motherwell uses barely any forms, and the entire painting is mostly one color.
