= Varujan Boghosian =

American artist (1926–2020)

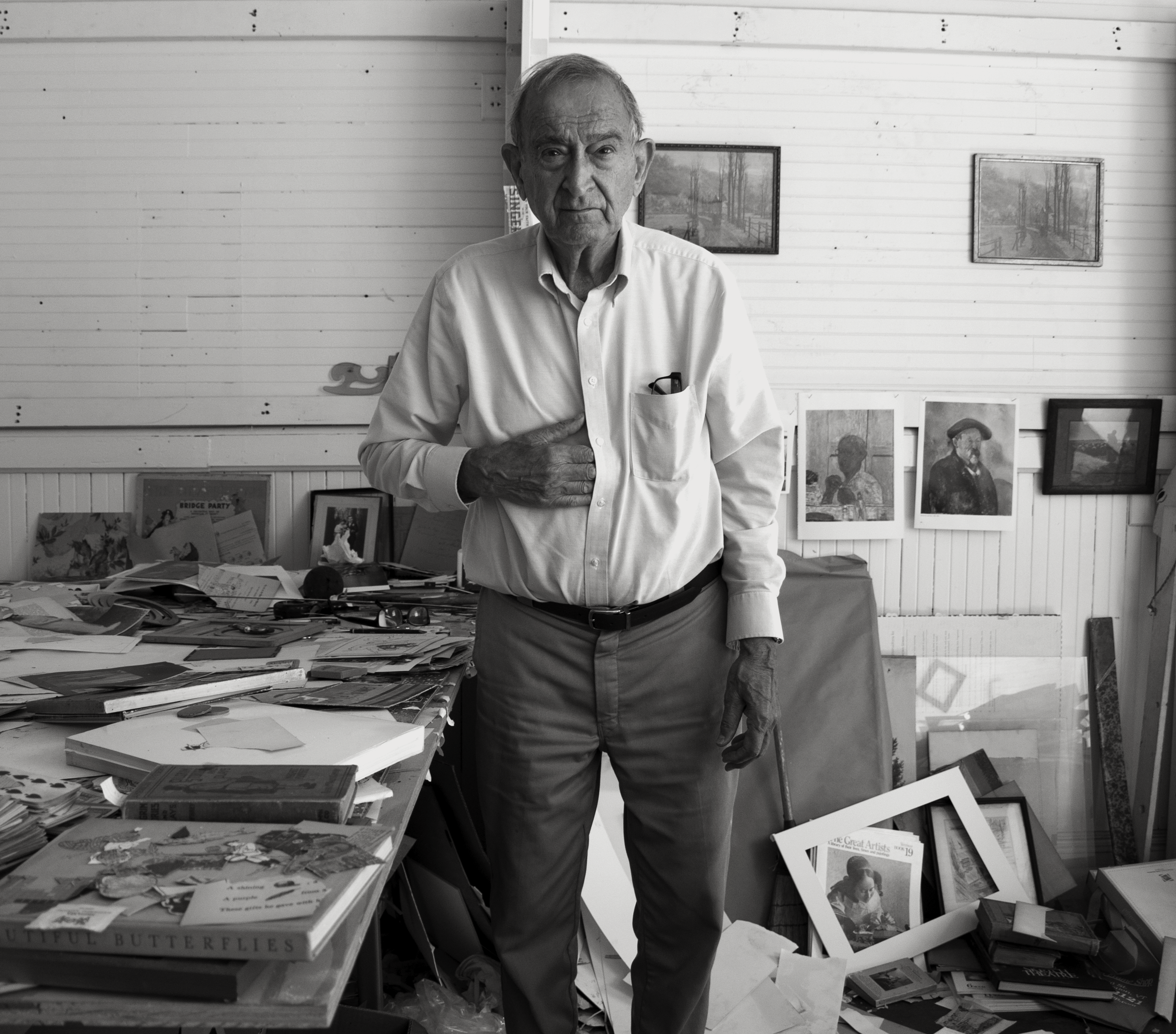
- Varujan Boghosian, photographed at his studio in Hanover, NH by Elyse Harary on September 27, 2015
- Born: Varujan Yegan Boghosian; 1926; New Britain, Connecticut, United States
- Died: September 21, 2020 (aged 94); Hanover, New Hampshire, United States
- Known for: Assemblage, Collage, Sculpture
- Movement: Surrealism

Varujan Yegan Boghosian (1926 New Britain, Connecticut - September 21, 2020) was an American artist, best known for his sculptures and assemblages. During his career, he held teaching positions at the University of Florida, Cooper Union, Pratt Institute, Yale University, Brown University and Dartmouth College. At Dartmouth, Boghosian was a member of the art faculty from 1968 to 1995. He was awarded an endowed position as the George Frederick Jewett Professor of Art in 1982. Boghosian retired from Dartmouth in 1995 and had since continued his work as a practicing artist up until his death. He was survived by his only daughter, Heidi Boghosian, a lawyer, author and activist

== Early life ==
The son of Armenian immigrants, Boghosian was born and raised in New Britain, Connecticut. His father was a cobbler who later worked for Stanley Tools (now Stanley Black & Decker). Boghosian's early schooling was traditional although he benefited from classes taught by the poet Constance Carrier, who introduced him to the world of literature.

Boghosian served in the U.S. Navy, during World War II. Returning to the U.S in 1946 he was able to attend college on the G.I. Bill.

Boghosian was then invited by Josef Albers to attend Yale University (1956–59), along with Irving Petlin, Boghosian had already received a number of accolades as well as a Fulbright Grant for Painting in Italy (1953) and in 1966, he was artist in residence at the American Academy in Rome. He was a 1985 Guggenheim fellow. He taught at The Cooper Union (1959–64), Yale University (1962–64), Brown and Dartmouth College (1968–96).

== Art and influences ==
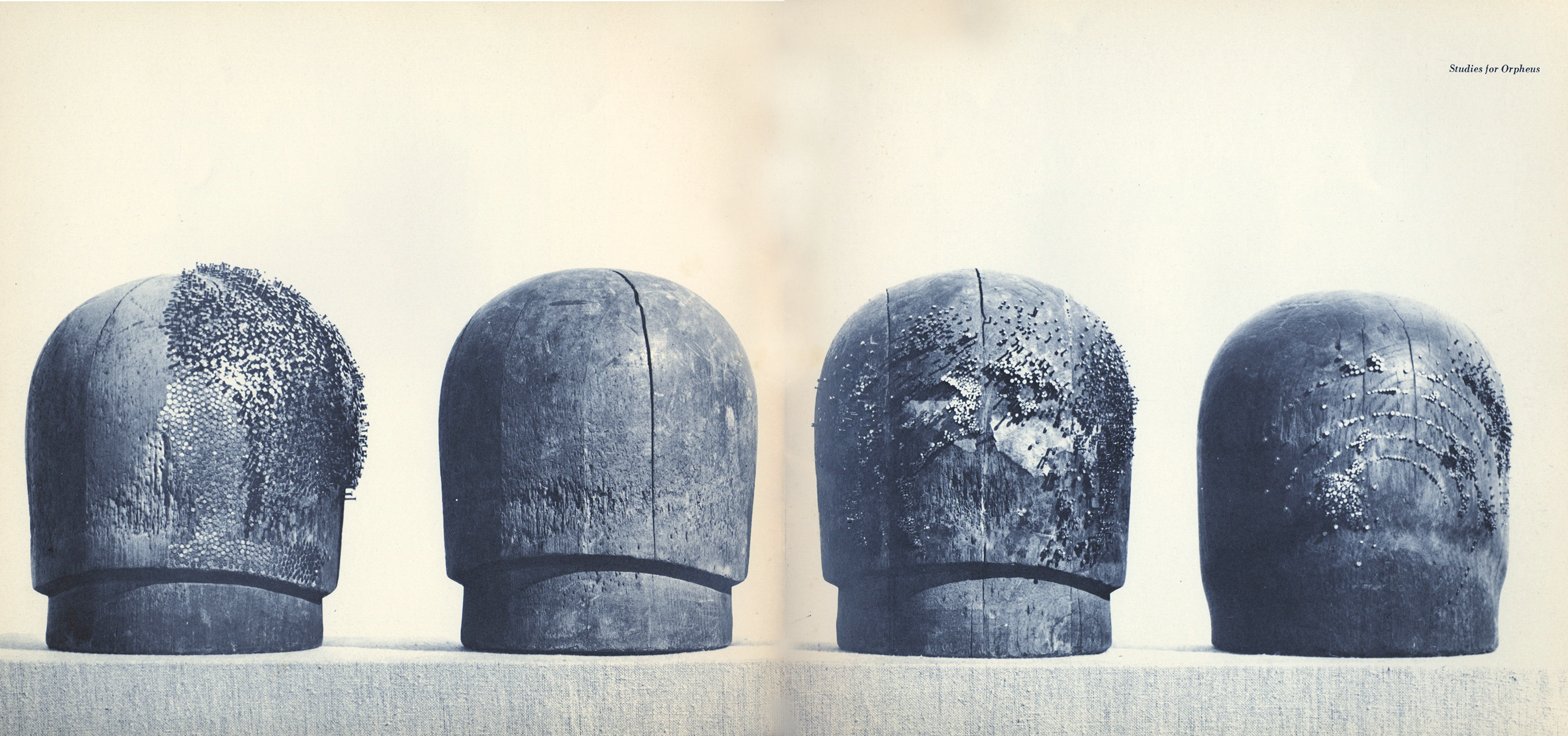
Varujan Boghosian "Studies for Orpheus" at the Stable Gallery, 1963.

Boghosian showed with the legendary Stable Gallery, founded by Eleanor Ward, consistently between 1963 and 1966. At this time, the Stable Gallery showcased various young and emerging artists including: Joseph Cornell, Alex Katz, Marisol Escobar, Joan Mitchell, Isamu Noguchi, Cy Twombly, Robert Rauschenberg, and Larry Rivers as well as Andy Warhol's first one-man show. The unorthodox and experimental spirit of this time has remained with Boghosian and informed his developing relationship with the appropriation of everyday objects and their subsequent plastic manipulations.

In 1968, Boghosian began to exhibit with the historic Cordier & Ekstrom Gallery, Duchamp's dealer in America. It was an ideal fit for Boghosian, as Arne Ekstrom's distinctive style favored the union of art and literature. Cordier & Ekstrom put on far-reaching shows that gave the same attention to world-renowned artists as it did to those who were just emerging. Morris Louis and Isamu Noguchi were some of the artists who frequented the gallery and it was where Romare Bearden honed his style. The gallery's circulating exhibition roster included such prominent names as Dubuffet, Matisse, Saul Steinberg, and Magritte. Boghosian developed a long-standing relationship with Arne Ekstrom and exhibited with the gallery well into the late 1980s.

Boghosian's art drew inspiration from a variety of sources including literature, art, history and music. Allusions to myth and poetry pervade his work. Explorations of the myths of Orpheus and Eurydice, for instance, were a central and continuous theme throughout his career. Closely linked to this fascination with classical myth is Boghosian's recurring use of symbols such as swans and serpents, both of which are rooted in a strong tradition of cross-cultural mythology.

Building upon the traditions of Surrealism and Dada Boghosian's assemblages and collages playfully contemplate the boundaries between dream and reality. In creating his art, Boghosian drew heavily on his extensive personal archive of found objects, gathered together in his home and studio. The images and objects that he utilized often bore the mark of time and his creations frequently juxtapose groups of seemingly unrelated objects together. In describing his artistic process, Boghosian is quoted as saying "I don't make anything. I find everything.”

== Career development and recognition ==
Boghosian's work began to be included in the thematic exhibitions at the Museum of Modern Art, the Whitney Museum of American Art, and the Art Institute of Chicago as early as 1954. He has also received numerous grants including a Fulbright, a Guggenheim Fellowship (1985), and residency at the American Academy in Rome with Philip Guston, and he has been an active member of the American Academy of Arts and Letters since 1968, and a National Academician of The National Academy of Design.

Beginning with the Swetzoff Gallery, Boston (1950–65), Boghosian has been actively exhibiting with over 75 one-man exhibitions including the Arts Club of Chicago (1970), The American Academy in Rome (1986), the Aldrich Museum of Contemporary Art (1988), the Norton Gallery of Art (1992), the Hood Art Museum, Dartmouth (1989), the Toledo Museum of Art (2013), and the Philadelphia Museum of Art (2018).

His work is in the public collections of Brooklyn Museum; University Art Museum of the University of California Berkeley; Indianapolis Museum of Art; The Metropolitan Museum of Art, Museum of Modern Art; New York Public Library; Whitney Museum of American Art; and the Provincetown Art Association and Museum, among many others. Notable retrospectives include a 1989 exhibition at the Hood Museum of Art at Dartmouth College and a 2013 exhibition at the Toledo Museum of Art.

His papers are held at the Archives of American Art.
