= Linda Lindeberg =

American artist (1915–1973)

Linda Lindeberg (1915-1973) was an abstract expressionist painter.

She was born in 1915 and died from cancer in 1973. In her adult life Lindeberg lived in New York with her husband Giorgio Cavallon who was also an artist. Lindeberg studied at Hoffman School in New York under Hans Hoffman. Lindeberg's work has been described as "dizzy and bright" by Dore Ashton, in the New York Times. The medium she employed in her art includes ink, pencil, and oil paint on paper. Lindeberg's art was exhibited in the Museum of Modern Art (MoMA), the Whitney Museum, the Riverside Museum, the Houston Art Museum, and the Berkley Art Museum. One of her most famous pieces is "Hanging Man" which is ink on paper and was displayed at MoMA.
