= Robert Motherwell =

American abstract expressionist painter, printmaker (1915–1991)

- Born: January 24, 1915; Aberdeen, Washington, U.S.
- Died: July 16, 1991 (aged 76); Provincetown, Massachusetts, U.S.
- Education: Stanford University (BA); Harvard University; Columbia University
- Known for: Painting, Printmaking
- Movement: Abstract expressionism
- Spouse: Helen Frankenthaler (1958–1971)

Robert Motherwell (January 24, 1915 – July 16, 1991) was an American abstract expressionist painter, printmaker, and editor of The Dada Painters and Poets: an Anthology. He was one of the youngest of the New York School, which also included Willem de Kooning, Jackson Pollock, and Mark Rothko.

Trained in philosophy, Motherwell then became an artist regarded as among the most articulate spokesmen and the founders of the abstract expressionist painters. He was known for his series of abstract paintings and prints which touched on political, philosophical and literary themes, such as the Elegies to the Spanish Republic.

== Early life and education ==
Robert Motherwell was born in Aberdeen, Washington on January 24, 1915, the first child of Robert Burns Motherwell II and Margaret Hogan Motherwell. The family later moved to San Francisco, where Motherwell's father served as president of Wells Fargo Bank, but returned to Cohasset Beach, Washington, every summer during his youth. Another Aberdeen native with a home at Cohasset Beach was Lance Wood Hart, painter and art teacher, who became Motherwell's early mentor. Due to the artist's asthmatic condition, Motherwell was reared largely on the Pacific Coast and spent most of his school years in California. There he developed a love for the broad spaces and bright colours that later emerged as essential characteristics of his abstract paintings (ultramarine blue of the sky and yellow ochre of Californian hills). His later concern with themes of mortality can likewise be traced to his frail health as a child.

Between 1932 and 1937, Motherwell briefly studied painting at California School of Fine Arts, San Francisco and received a BA in philosophy from Stanford University. At Stanford, Motherwell was introduced to modernism through his extensive reading of symbolist and other literature, especially Mallarmé, James Joyce, Edgar Allan Poe, and Octavio Paz. This passion stayed with Motherwell for the rest of his life and became a major theme of his later paintings and drawings.

At the age of 20, Motherwell took a grand tour of Europe, accompanied by his father and sister. They began in Paris, then traveled to Amalfi, Italy. The next stops were Switzerland, Germany, The Netherlands and London. The group ended their tour in Motherwell, Scotland.

According to Motherwell, the reason he went to Harvard was that he wanted to be a painter, although his father urged him to pursue a more secure career: "And finally after months of really a cold war he made a very generous agreement with me that if I would get a Ph.D. so that I would be equipped to teach in a college as an economic insurance, he would give me fifty dollars a week for the rest of my life to do whatever I wanted to do on the assumption that with fifty dollars I could not starve but it would be no inducement to last. So with that agreed on Harvard then—it was actually the last year—Harvard still had the best philosophy school in the world. And since I had taken my degree at Stanford in philosophy, and since he didn't care what the Ph.D. was in, I went on to Harvard."

At Harvard, Motherwell studied under Arthur Oncken Lovejoy and David Wite Prall. He spent a year in Paris to research the writings of Eugène Delacroix, where he met American composer Arthur Berger who advised him to continue his education at Columbia University, under Meyer Schapiro. In 1939, Lance Wood Hart, then a professor of drawing and painting at the University of Oregon, invited Motherwell to join him in Eugene, Ore., to assist in teaching his classes for a full semester.

== The New York School and the Surrealists ==
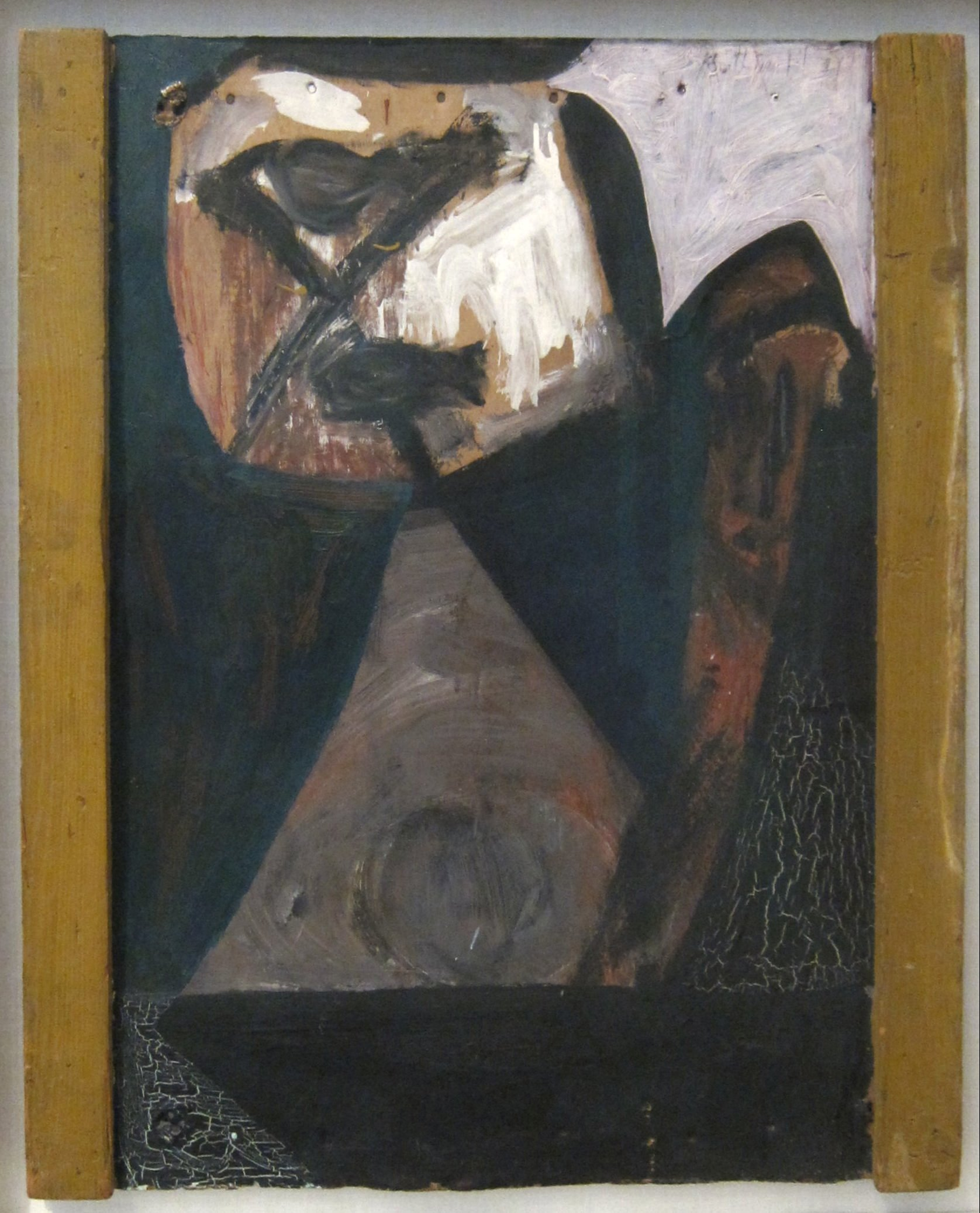
Robert Motherwell, Ulysses, 1947, oil paint on cardboard and wood construction, Tate Modern

In 1940, Motherwell moved to New York to study at Columbia University, where he was encouraged by Meyer Schapiro to devote himself to painting rather than scholarship. Schapiro introduced the young artist to a group of exiled Parisian Surrealists (Max Ernst, Duchamp, Masson) and arranged for Motherwell to study with Kurt Seligmann. The time that Motherwell spent with the Surrealists proved to be influential to his artistic process. After a 1941 voyage with Roberto Matta to Mexico—on a boat where he met Maria Emilia Ferreira y Moyeros, an actress and his future wife—Motherwell decided to make painting his primary vocation. The sketches Motherwell made in Mexico later evolved into his first important paintings, such as The Little Spanish Prison (1941) and Pancho Villa, Dead and Alive (1943).

Matta introduced Motherwell to the concept of "automatic" drawing or automatism, which the Surrealists used to tap into their unconscious. The concept had a lasting effect on Motherwell, further augmented by his meeting with the artist Wolfgang Paalen. Motherwell's encounter with Paalen prompted him to prolong his stay in Mexico for several months, in order to collaborate with him. Motherwell's noted Mexican Sketchbook visually reflects the resulting change: while the first drawings are influenced by Matta and Yves Tanguy, later drawings associated with Motherwell's time with Paalen show more plane graphic cadences and details distinguished from the earlier period. Paalen also introduced Motherwell to André Breton, via a letter. Motherwell's seminal trip to Mexico has been described as a little-known but important factor in the history and aesthetics of abstract expressionism. In 1991, shortly before his death, Motherwell remembered a "conspiracy of silence" regarding Paalen's innovative role in the genesis of abstract expressionism.

Upon return from Mexico Motherwell spent time developing his creative principle based on automatism: "What I realized was that Americans potentially could paint like angels but that there was no creative principle around, so that everybody who liked modern art was copying it. Gorky was copying Picasso. Pollock was copying Picasso. De Kooning was copying Picasso. I mean I say this unqualifiedly. I was painting French intimate pictures or whatever. And all we needed was a creative principle, I mean something that would mobilize this capacity to paint in a creative way, and that's what Europe had that we hadn't had; we had always followed in their wake. And I thought of all the possibilities of free association—because I also had a psychoanalytic background and I understood the implications—might be the best chance to really make something entirely new which everybody agreed was the thing to do."

Thus, in the early 1940s, Robert Motherwell played a significant role in laying the foundations for the new movement of abstract expressionism (or the New York School): "Matta wanted to start a revolution, a movement, within Surrealism. He asked me to find some other American artists that would help start a new movement. It was then that Baziotes and I went to see Pollock and de Kooning and Hofmann and Kamrowski and Busa and several other people. And if we could come with something. Peggy Guggenheim who liked us said that she would put on a show of this new business. And so I went around explaining the theory of automatism to everybody because the only way that you could have a movement was that it had some common principle. It sort of all began that way."

In 1942 Motherwell began to exhibit his work in New York and in 1944 he had his first one-man show at Peggy Guggenheim's "Art of This Century" gallery; that same year the Museum of Modern Art was the first museum to purchase one of his works. From the mid-1940s, Motherwell became the leading spokesman for avant-garde art in America. His circle came to include William Baziotes, David Hare, Barnett Newman, and Mark Rothko, with whom he eventually started the Subjects of the Artist School (1948–1949). In 1949 Motherwell divorced Maria and in 1950 he married Betty Little, with whom he had two daughters.

Motherwell was a member of the editorial board of the Surrealist magazine VVV and a contributor to Wolfgang Paalen's journal DYN, which was edited from 1942 to 1944 in six issues. He also edited Paalen's collected essays Form and Sense in 1945 as the first issue of Problems of Contemporary Art.

Robert Motherwell, Elegy to the Spanish Republic No. 110, 1971, acrylic with pencil and charcoal on canvas, 82 x 114 inches, Solomon R. Guggenheim Museum

In 1948 Motherwell executed the image which would prove to be the germ of the Elegies to the Spanish Republic, one of his best known series of works. During 1947–48, Motherwell collaborated with the art critic Harold Rosenberg and others to produce Possibilities, an art review. During the latter year Motherwell created an image incorporating Rosenberg's poem "The Bird for Every Bird", meant for inclusion in the review's second issue. The top half was a handwritten, stylized rendering of the poem's final three lines, and the bottom half was a visual element consisting of roughly rendered black ovoid and rectangular forms against a white background. The stark image was meant to "illustrate" the violent imagery of the poem in an abstract, non-literal way; Motherwell therefore preferred the term "illumination". The second issue of Possibilities did not materialize, and Motherwell placed the image in storage. He rediscovered it roughly one year later and decided to rework its basic elements. This led to the Elegies to the Spanish Republic which Motherwell continued to produce for the rest of his life; several years later Motherwell retroactively titled the original image Elegy to the Spanish Republic No. 1, recognizing it as the series' starting point. A representative example is Elegy to the Spanish Republic No. 110 (1971) which employs the same visual motif of rough ovoid and rectangular forms. The series' abstract imagery has been interpreted as representing violence in Hispanic culture, not necessarily related to the Spanish Civil War of its title. For example, Motherwell himself and others have compared the images to the display of a dead bull's genitalia in the Spanish bullfighting ring.

In 1948, Motherwell, William Baziotes, Barnett Newman, David Hare, and Mark Rothko founded the Subjects of the Artist School at 35 East 8th Street. Well-attended lectures were open to the public with speakers such as Jean Arp, John Cage and Ad Reinhardt. The school failed financially and closed in the spring of 1949. Throughout the 1950s Motherwell taught painting at Hunter College in New York and at Black Mountain College in North Carolina. Cy Twombly, Robert Rauschenberg and Kenneth Noland studied under and were influenced by Motherwell. At this time, he was a prolific writer and lecturer, and in addition to directing the influential Documents of Modern Art Series, he edited The Dada Painters and Poets: An Anthology, which was published in 1951.

In 1950, architect Percival Goodman commissioned Motherwell to create a mural for the entrance hall of Congregation B'nai Israel in Millburn, New Jersey. Motherwell's 1951 preparatory drawing Tablets of Moses abstracted Jewish symbols that he incorporated into the completed mural.

From 1954 to 1958, during the break-up of his second marriage, he worked on a small series of paintings which incorporated the words Je t'aime, expressing his most intimate and private feelings. His collages began to incorporate material from his studio such as cigarette packets and labels, becoming records of his daily life. He was married for a third time, from 1958 to 1971, to fellow abstract painter Helen Frankenthaler. Because Frankenthaler and Motherwell were both born into wealth and known to host lavish parties, the pair were known as "the golden couple".

== Mature years ==
Robert Motherwell, Untitled, oil on canvas, 1963, Honolulu Museum of Art

In 1958–59, Motherwell was included in "The New American Painting" exhibition, initiated by the Museum of Modern Art, which traveled across Europe. In 1958 he and Frankenthaler spent a three-month honeymoon in Spain and France, during which he began painting with a new energy that he attributed to her influence. The Two Figures series he made that year shows "the brightening power of Helen's colors" on his work.

During the 1960s, Motherwell exhibited widely in both America and Europe and in 1965 he was given a major retrospective exhibition at the Museum of Modern Art; this show subsequently traveled to Amsterdam, London, Brussels, Essen, and Turin. In 1962, Motherwell and Frankenthaler spent the summer at the artists' colony at Provincetown, Massachusetts, where the coastline inspired the Beside the Sea series of 64 paintings, the oil paint splashed with full force imitating the sea crashing on the shore in front of his studio. The 1963 untitled oil on canvas painting in the collection of the Honolulu Museum of Art exemplifies this stage in the artist's career.

In 1964, Motherwell created a mural-sized painting entitled Dublin 1916, with Black and Tan, which is in the Governor Nelson A. Rockefeller Empire State Plaza Art Collection in Albany, N.Y. The size and content suggest that Motherwell intended to create a monument to heroism in the tradition of Picasso's Guernica.

In 1965 Motherwell worked on another prominent series called the Lyric Suite, named after Alban Berg's string quartet. Motherwell recalled, "I went to a Japanese store to buy a toy for a friend's kid, and I saw this beautiful Japanese paper and I bought a thousand sheets. And I made up my mind, this was in the beginning of April 1965, that I would do the thousand sheets without correction. I'd make an absolute rule for myself. And I got to 600 in April and May, when one night my wife and I were having dinner and the telephone rang. And it was Kenneth Noland in Vermont saying that I should come immediately. And I said, 'what's happened?' And he said, 'David Smith's been in an accident'." Smith, the sculptor, was Motherwell and Frankenthaler's friend. The couple drove hastily to Vermont, arriving 15 minutes after Smith had died. Motherwell stopped work on the series. He said of them: "And then one year I had them all framed, and I like them very much now. I should also say that I half painted them and they half painted themselves. I'd never used rice paper before except occasionally as an element in a collage. And most of these were made with very small, I mean very thin lines. And then I would look at amazement on the floor after I'd finished. It would spread like spots of oil and fill all kinds of strange dimensions."

Robert Motherwell, Gray Open with White Paint, 1981, soft-ground etching and pochoir on gray Auvergne à la Main handmade paper, 20¼ × 26¼ in

In 1967 Motherwell began to work on his Open series. Inspired by a chance juxtaposition of a large and small canvas, the Open paintings occupied Motherwell for nearly two decades. The Opens consist of limited planes of colour, broken up by minimally rendered lines in loosely rectangular configurations. As the series progressed, the works became more complex and more painterly, as Motherwell worked through the possible permutations of such reduced means.

The late 1960s saw Motherwell using Gauloises packets and cartons in many collages, including an extensive series with the packets surrounded by bright red acrylic paint, often with incised lines in the painted areas.

In 1972 Motherwell married the artist-photographer Renate Ponsold and moved to Greenwich, Connecticut, where they lived in a carriage house with a hayloft aerie, a barn and a guest cottage adjoining a large studio. He had begun living there full-time beginning in the fall of 1971 after his divorce from Helen Frankenthaler was finalized. Motherwell set up different studios for different modes of production (painting, collage, printmaking) throughout the 13,000 ft^{2} (1,200 m^{2}) property. During the 1970s, he had retrospective exhibitions in several European cities, including Düsseldorf, Stockholm, Vienna, Paris, Edinburgh, and London. In 1977, Motherwell was given a major mural commission for the new wing of the National Gallery of Art in Washington, D.C.

In 1983, a major retrospective exhibition of Motherwell's work, organized by Douglas G. Schultz, was held at the Albright-Knox Art Gallery in Buffalo, New York.

From 1983 to 1985, this exhibition was subsequently shown at major museums, Los Angeles County Museum of Art San Francisco Museum of Modern Art, Seattle Art Museum, Corcoran Gallery of Art, and Solomon R. Guggenheim Museum. Another retrospective was shown in Mexico City, Monterey, and Fort Worth, Texas, in 1991.

In 1985, Motherwell was awarded the Edward Macdowell Medal.

In 1988, Motherwell worked with the publisher Andrew Hoyem of Arion Press on a limited edition of the modernist novel Ulysses, by James Joyce. Motherwell produced 40 lithographs for the project.

== Death and legacy ==
Motherwell died in Provincetown, Massachusetts on July 16, 1991. On his death, Clement Greenberg, champion of the New York School, left in little doubt his esteem for the artist, commenting that "although he is underrated today, in my opinion he was one of the very best of the abstract expressionist painters".

The Dedalus Foundation was set up by Robert Motherwell in 1981 to foster public understanding of modern art and modernism through its support of research, education, publications, and exhibitions. When Motherwell died, he left an estate then estimated at more than $25 million and more than 1,000 works of art, not including prints. His will was filed for probate in Greenwich and named as executors his widow, Renate Ponsold Motherwell, and longtime friend Richard Rubin, a professor of political science at Swarthmore College.

On July 20, 1991, several hundred people attended a memorial service for Motherwell on the beach outside his Provincetown home. Among them were the writer Norman Mailer and the photographer Joel Meyerowitz, both Provincetown summer residents. Speakers included the poet Stanley Kunitz, who read a poem that was a favorite of Motherwell's, William Butler Yeats's Sailing to Byzantium. Others in attendance included family members, friends, other artists, and Senator Howard Metzenbaum, an acquaintance of Motherwell's.

== Selected exhibitions ==
Several major exhibitions of Motherwell's work have been held.

- Peggy Guggenheim's Art of this Century Gallery, New York (1944).
- Bennington College, Bennington, Vermont (1957)
- Galerie Heinz Berggruen, Paris, France (1961)
- Pasadena Art Museum, California (1962)
- Smith College Museum of Art (1963)
- The Phillips Collection, Washington, D.C. (1965)
- The Museum of Modern Art, New York (1965)
- The Museum of Fine Arts, Houston, Texas (1972–73, traveled)
- David Mirvish Gallery, Toronto, Ontario, Canada (1973)
- Princeton University Art Museum, New Jersey (1973)
- Museo de Arte Moderna, Mexico City, Mexico (1975)
- Stadtisches Kunsthalle, Düsseldorf, Germany (1976)
- Musée d'art moderne de la ville de Paris, France (1977)
- Royal Academy of Art, London, England (1978)
- The William Benton Museum of Art, University of Connecticut, Storrs (1979)
- Fundación Juan March, Madrid, Spain (1980)
- Albright-Knox Art Gallery, Buffalo, New York (1983, traveled)
- Walker Art Center, Minneapolis, Minnesota (1985)
- Museo Rufino Tamayo, Mexico City, Mexico (1991–92, traveled)
- Fundació Antoni Tàpies, Barcelona, Spain (1996–97, traveled)
- Museum Morsbroich, Leverkusen, Germany (2004–05)
- Robert Motherwell. Three Poems by Octavio Paz, Museo de Arte Abstracto Español, Cuenca Spain (2008–09)
- Art Gallery of Ontario, Canada (2011)
- Motherwell and the Poets (Octavio Paz and Rafael Alberti), Fundación Juan March Madrid (2012)
- Robert Motherwell: Lyric Suite, the Metropolitan Museum of Art (2015)
- Robert Motherwell: Pure Painting, Modern Art Museum of Fort Worth, Fort Worth, Texas (2023)

== Books ==
- Robert Motherwell, The Dada Painters and Poets, R. Motherwell, New York, 1951.
- Robert Motherwell, The Collected Writings of Robert Motherwell, University of California Press, 1999.
- Robert Motherwell translated to English Paul Signac's book, D'Eugène Delacroix au néo-impressionisme, 1938.
- Arnason, H.H. Robert Motherwell. New York: Harry N. Abrams, 1977; revised edition 1982.
- Motherwell, Robert, Engberg, Siri and Joan Banach. Robert Motherwell: The Complete Prints 1940–1991. Minneapolis: Walker Art Center, 2003.
- Flam, Jack. Motherwell. London: Phaidon, 1991
- Marika Herskovic, American Abstract Expressionism of the 1950s An Illustrated Survey, (New York School Press, 2003.) ISBN 0-9677994-1-4. p. 238-241
- Marika Herskovic, New York School Abstract Expressionists Artists Choice by Artists, (New York School Press, 2000.) ISBN 0-9677994-0-6. p. 11; p. 16; p. 27; p. 38; p. 258-261
- Robert Hobbs. "Robert Motherwell Retrospective." Düsseldorf: Städische Kunsthalle Düsseldorf, 1976.
- Robert Hobbs, Matthew Collings, Mel Gooding and Robert Motherwell. "Open." London: 21 Publishing Ltd., 2009.
- Kingsley, April. The Turning Point: The Abstract Expressionists and the Transformation of American Art. New York: Simon & Schuster, 1992.
- Pleynet, Marcelin. Robert Motherwell. Paris: Daniel Papierski, 1989.
