= Hans Hofmann =

German-American painter (1880–1966)

- Hans Hofmann, Effervescence, oil, India ink, casein and enamel on plywood panel, 54.375” x 35.875”, 1942.
- Born: March 21, 1880; Weißenburg, German Empire
- Died: February 17, 1966 (aged 85); New York City, U.S
- Known for: Painting
- Movement: Abstract Expressionism

Hans Hofmann (March 21, 1880 – February 17, 1966) was a German-born American painter, renowned as both an artist and teacher. His career spanned two generations and two continents, and is considered to have both preceded and influenced Abstract Expressionism. Born and educated near Munich, he was active in the early twentieth-century European avant-garde and brought a deep understanding and synthesis of Symbolism, Neo-impressionism, Fauvism, and Cubism when he emigrated to the United States in 1932. Hofmann's painting is characterized by its rigorous concern with pictorial structure and unity, spatial illusionism, and use of bold color for expressive means. The influential critic Clement Greenberg considered Hofmann's first New York solo show at Peggy Guggenheim’s Art of This Century in 1944 (along with Jackson Pollock’s in late 1943) as a breakthrough in painterly versus geometric abstraction that heralded abstract expressionism. In the decade that followed, Hofmann's recognition grew through numerous exhibitions, notably at the Kootz Gallery, culminating in major retrospectives at the Whitney Museum of American Art (1957) and Museum of Modern Art (1963), which traveled to venues throughout the United States, South America, and Europe. His works are in the permanent collections of major museums around the world, including the Metropolitan Museum of Art, Tate Modern, Germanisches Nationalmuseum, National Gallery of Art, and Art Institute of Chicago.

Hofmann is also regarded as one of the most influential art teachers of the 20th century. He established an art school in Munich in 1915 that built on the ideas and work of Cézanne, the Cubists and Kandinsky; some art historians suggest it was the first modern school of art anywhere. After relocating to the United States, he reopened the school in both New York City and Provincetown, Massachusetts until he retired from teaching in 1958 to paint full-time. His presence in New York teaching had a significant influence on post-war American avant-garde artists—including Joseph Glasco, Helen Frankenthaler, Nell Blaine, Lee Krasner, Joan Mitchell, Louise Nevelson, and Larry Rivers, among many others—as well as on the theories of Greenberg, in his emphasis on the medium, picture plane, and unity of the work. Some of Hofmann's other key tenets include his push/pull spatial theories, his insistence that abstract art has its origin in nature, and his belief in the spiritual value of art. Hofmann died of a heart attack at 85 in New York City on February 17, 1966.

== Biography ==
Hans Hofmann was born in Weißenburg, Bavaria on March 21, 1880 to Theodor Friedrich Hofmann (1855–1903) and Franziska Manger Hofmann (1849–1921). In 1886, his family moved to Munich, where his father took a job with the government. From a young age, Hofmann gravitated towards science and mathematics. At age sixteen, he followed his father into public service, working for the Bavarian government as assistant to the director of Public Works. He increased his knowledge of mathematics there, eventually developing and patenting devices including an electromagnetic comptometer, a radar device for ships at sea, a sensitized light bulb, and a portable freezer unit for military use. During this time, Hofmann also became interested in creative studies, beginning art lessons between 1898 and 1899 with German artist Moritz Heymann.

Between 1900 and 1904, Hofmann met his future wife, Maria "Miz" Wolfegg (1885–1963) in Munich, and also became acquainted with Philipp Freudenberg, owner of Berlin's high-end department store, Kaufhaus Gerson, and an avid art collector. Freudenberg became Hofmann's patron over the next decade, enabling him to relocate and live in Paris with Miz. In Paris, Hofmann studied at the Académie de la Grande Chaumière and Académie Colarossi. He also immersed himself in Paris's avant-garde art scene, working with Matisse and becoming friends with Picasso, Georges Braque, and Robert and Sonia Delaunay. Hofmann worked and exhibited in Paris until the onset of World War I, producing paintings most influenced by the Cubists and Cézanne. Forced to return to Germany, and excluded from military service because of a respiratory condition, Hofmann opened an art school in Munich in 1915, developing a reputation as a forward-thinking instructor. In 1930, he was invited to teach on the west coast of the United States, which ultimately paved the way for him to permanently settle in the United States in 1932, where he resided until the end of his life. Hofmann and Miz would live apart for six years, until she procured an immigration visa to the United States in 1939.

Between 1933 and 1958, Hofmann balanced his studio work with teaching, and as he did in Paris, immersed himself in (and influenced) New York's growing avant-garde art scene. He reopened his art school in 1934, conducting classes in New York and in Provincetown during summer. In 1941, he became an American citizen. During this time, his work drew increasing attention and acclaim critics, dealers and museums. In 1958, he retired from teaching to focus on painting, which led to a late-career efflorescence (at age seventy-eight) of his work. In 1963, Miz Hofmann, his partner and wife for over sixty years, died after a surgery. Two years later, Hofmann married Renate Schmitz, who remained with him until his death from a heart attack in New York City on February 17, 1966, just prior to his 86th birthday.

== Work and exhibitions ==
Hans Hofmann, Pompeii, oil on canvas, 84.25” x 52.25", 1959.

Hofmann's art is generally distinguished by its rigorous concern with pictorial structure and unity, development of spatial illusion through the "push and pull" of color, shape and placement, and use of bold, often primary color for expressive means. In the first decades of the century, he painted in a modernist, though still identifiably representational style, creating landscapes, still lifes and portraits largely influenced by Cubism and Cézanne in terms of form, and Kandinsky, Matisse and Van Gogh in terms of color. He began an extended period focused solely on drawing sometime in the 1920s, returning to painting in 1935. By 1940, however, he began to paint completely abstract works such as Spring, a small oil on panel "drip" painting. Art historians have described that work, and others such as The Wind (1942), Fantasia (1943) and Effervescence (1944), in terms of their "painterly attacks," jolting contrasts, rich color, and gestural spontaneity as "records of the artist’s intense experience" of paint, color, and processes that were arbitrary, accidental and direct, as well as intentional. They demonstrate Hofmann's early stylistic experimentation with the techniques that would be termed "action painting," which Pollock and others made famous by the end of the decade. Hofmann believed that abstract art was a way to get at important reality, once stating that "the ability to simplify means to eliminate the unnecessary, so that the necessary may speak."

Hofmann's work in the 1940s was championed by several key figures who initiated a new era of growing influence for art dealers and galleries, including Peggy Guggenheim, Betty Parsons, and Samuel M. Kootz. His first New York solo show at Guggenheim's Art of This Century gallery in 1944 was positively reviewed in the New York Times, ARTnews and Arts Digest. Critic Clement Greenberg regarded that show—and Jackson Pollock's a few months prior—as a "break-out" from the "cramping hold of Synthetic Cubism" on American painting, which opened the path to the more painterly style of abstract expressionism. That same year, Hofmann was also featured in a solo exhibition at The Arts Club of Chicago, and two key group shows of Abstract and Surrealist art in America, curated by Sidney Janis and Parsons. Reviewing a 1945 Hofmann exhibit, Greenberg wrote, "Hofmann has become a force to be reckoned with in the practice as well as in the interpretation of modern art." Not all critics were uniform in praise; for example, Robert Coates, one of the first to call the new work "abstract expressionism," expressed skepticism about the "spatter-and-daub" style of painting in a 1946 review of Hofmann's work. In 1947, Hofmann began exhibiting annually at the Kootz Gallery in New York (and would do so every year through 1966, except 1948 when the gallery temporarily closed), and over the next decade continued to gain recognition.

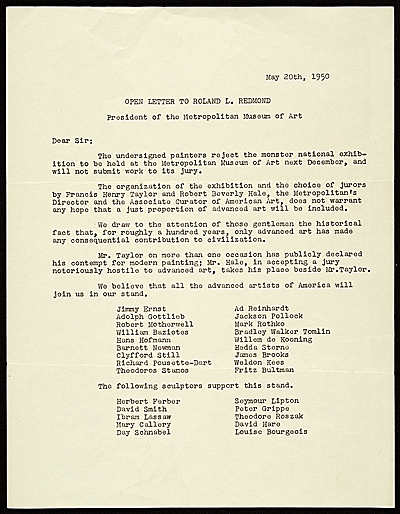
"Open Letter to Roland L. Redmond, President of the Metropolitan Museum of Art." Hofmann was among a group who would become known as The Irascibles, 18 painters and 10 sculptors who in May 1950 sent an open letter to the Met, rejecting the museum's "monster national exhibition" to be held in December. Francis Henry Taylor, the Met's Director, they said, had "publicly declared his contempt for modern painting," and Robert Beverly Hale, the Associate Curator of American Art, has "accepted a jury notoriously hostile to advanced art."

In his later period, Hofmann often worked less gesturally, creating works such as The Gate (1959–60), Pompeii (1959) or To Miz - Pax Vobiscum (a 1964 memorial after her death), that were loosely devoted to architectonic volumes and sometimes referred to as his "slab paintings." In these works, he used rectangles of sensual color that reinforced the shape of his consistent easel-painting format and sometimes suggested a modular logic, yet escaped definitive readings through areas of modulated paint and irregular shapes.

In 1957, the Whitney Museum put up a large retrospective on Hofmann, which traveled to seven additional museums in the United States over the next year. In his review of the retrospective, critic Harold Rosenberg wrote, "No American artist could mount a show of greater coherent variety than Hans Hofmann." In 1960, Hofmann was selected to represent the United States at the Venice Biennale, alongside Philip Guston, Franz Kline and Theodore Roszak. In 1963, The Museum of Modern Art gave a full-scale retrospective, organized by William Seitz, with a catalogue that included excerpts from Hofmann's writings. The exhibit traveled in the next two years to five other venues in the U.S., museums in Buenos Aires and Caracas, and finally to five venues in the Netherlands, Italy and Germany.

Posthumous retrospectives of Hofmann's work include shows at the Hirshhorn Museum (1976), Whitney Museum (1990), and London's Tate Gallery ("Hans Hofmann: Late Paintings," 1988), which was curated by the British painter John Hoyland. Hoyland first encountered Hofmann's work during his first visit to New York in 1964, in the company of Clement Greenberg, and had been immediately impressed.

A 2017 exhibition at the Portland Museum of Art titled "Hans Hofmann: Works on Paper" was the first complete overview of his little known works on paper including ink, crayon, watercolor, gouache, and other media. The exhibition surveyed his life-long engagement with drawing, watercolor, and painting on paper. This exhibition was organized by the Museum of Contemporary Art Jacksonville, a cultural institute at the University of North Florida and supported by The Renate, Hans and Maria Hofmann Trust.

== Teaching ==
Hofmann was renowned not only as an artist but also as a teacher of art, both in his native Germany and later in the U.S. His value as a teacher lay in the consistency and uncompromising rigor of his artistic standards and his ability to teach the fundamental principles of postwar abstraction to a diverse body of students. He founded his first school, Schule für Bildende Kunst (School of Fine Art) in Munich in 1915, building on the ideas and work of Cézanne, the Cubists, and Kandinsky. His hands-on teaching methods included ongoing discussion of art theory, life drawing sessions, and regular critiques from Hofmann himself, a practice which was a rarity in the Academy. By the mid-1920s, he attained a reputation as a forward-thinking teacher and was attracting an international array of students seeking more avant-garde instruction, including Alf Bayrle, Alfred Jensen, Louise Nevelson, Wolfgang Paalen, Worth Ryder, and Bistra Vinarova. Art historian Herschel Chipp asserted that the school was likely the first school of modern art in existence. Hofmann ran the school, including summer sessions held throughout Germany, and in Austria, Croatia, Italy and France until he emigrated to the U.S. in 1932.

In the U.S., he initially taught a summer session at the University of California, Berkeley in 1930, at the invitation of former student Worth Ryder, then a member of the art faculty. He taught again at Berkeley and at the Chouinard Art Institute in Los Angeles the next year before again returning to Germany. After relocating to New York City, he began teaching at the Art Students League of New York in 1933. By 1934, Hofmann opened his own schools in New York and in Provincetown, Massachusetts. Many notable artists studied with him, including Lee Krasner, Helen Frankenthaler, Ray Eames, Larry Rivers, Allan Kaprow, Red Grooms, Nell Blaine, Irene Rice Pereira, Gerome Kamrowski, Ward Jackson, Fritz Bultman, Israel Levitan, Robert De Niro, Sr., Jane Freilicher, Wolf Kahn, Marisol Escobar, Burgoyne Diller, Alexandra Luke, James Gahagan, Richard Stankiewicz, Lillian Orlowsky, Louisa Matthíasdóttir, Linda Lindeberg, and Nína Tryggvadóttir. Beulah Stevenson, a long-time curator at the Brooklyn Museum, was also among his pupils. In 1958, Hofmann closed his schools in order to devote himself exclusively to his own creative work. In 1963, The Museum of Modern Art curated the traveling exhibit "Hans Hofmann and His Students," which included 58 works representing 51 artists.

Despite being credited with teaching a number of the most gifted women artists of the period—at a time when they were still somewhat rare—Hofmann has sometimes been described as exhibiting a "straightforward male chauvinist posture." Lee Krasner, who remained a devotee, likened some of his critiques to the back-handed praise earlier women artists often experienced (for example, "so good, you'd never know it was done by a woman!"). Sculptor Lila Katzen has related that he told her that "only men had the wings for art."

== Writing ==
Hofmann's influential writing on modern art have been collected in the book Search for the Real and Other Essays (1948), which includes his discussions of his push/pull spatial theories, his reverence for nature as a source for art, his conviction that art has spiritual value, and his philosophy of art in general. In formal terms, he is especially noteworthy as a theorist of the medium who argued that "each medium of expression has its own order of being," that "color is a plastic means of creating intervals," and his awareness of a painting's frame, represented by his quote, "any line placed on the canvas is already the fifth." Hofmann believed in remaining faithful to the flatness of the canvas support, and that to suggest depth and movement in a painting an artist must create what he called "push and pull" in the image—contrasts of color, form, and texture.

Hofmann held a strong conviction about the spiritual and social value of art. In 1932, he wrote: "Providing leadership by teachers and support of developing artists is a national duty, an insurance of spiritual solidarity, What we do for art, we do for ourselves and for our children and the future."

== Collections and art market ==
Hofmann's works are in the permanent collections of many major museums in the United States and throughout the world, including the: UC Berkeley Art Museum, Metropolitan Museum of Art, Solomon R. Guggenheim Museum, Whitney Museum, Museum of Modern Art, San Francisco Museum of Modern Art, Museum of Fine Arts Boston, Art Institute of Chicago, Seattle Art Museum, Baltimore Museum of Art, Museum of Fine Arts Houston, Cleveland Museum of Art, Philadelphia Museum of Art, Provincetown Art Association and Museum, Städtische Galerie im Lenbachhaus (Munich), Museu d'Art Contemporani, (Barcelona), Tate Gallery, Art Museum of West Virginia University, and the Art Gallery of Ontario (Toronto). Hofmann also designed a public work, a colorful mural located outside the entrance of the High School of Graphic Communication Arts located in the Hell's Kitchen neighborhood of Manhattan.

In 2015, at a Christie's New York auction, Hofmann's Auxerre (1960), inspired by the expansive stained glass windows of the Cathédrale Saint Etienne in France, achieved a world auction record for the artist at $6,325,000.

== Hofmann Estate ==
When Hofmann died on February 17, 1966, his widow, Renate Hofmann, managed his estate. After Renate's death in 1992, the New York Daily News published an article titled, "From Caviar to Cat Food," which detailed the "sad and tortuous story" of Hofmann's widow. The article contended that Renate's court-appointed guardians "milk[ed] the Estate for more than a decade" and allowed the mentally unstable Renate to live "with her cats and liquor in a garbage-strewn oceanfront home." Under threat of prosecution, the original executor of the Hofmann Estate, Robert Warshaw, was successful in having the neglectful guardians pay $8.7 million to the estate for "extraordinary conscious pain and suffering."

Under the will of Renate Hofmann, The Renate, Hans and Maria Hofmann Trust was formally created with Warshaw at its head. The mission of the Trust is "to promote the study and understanding of Hans Hofmann's extraordinary life and works" and to accomplish these goals "through exhibitions, publications and educational activities and programs focusing on Hans Hofmann" as well as a catalogue raisonné of Hofmann's paintings. The U.S. copyright representative for the Renate, Hans and Maria Hofmann Trust is the Artists Rights Society.

== See also ==
- Abstract art
- Abstract Imagists
- Art theory (aesthetics)
- Color field
- Modernism
- The Irascibles
- Western painting

== Sources ==
- Chipp, Herschel B.. Theories of modern art; a source book by artists and critics (Berkeley, University of California Press, 1968)
- Greenberg, Clement. Hofmann (Paris, Editions Georges Fall, 1961).
- Hofmann, Hans; Sara T Weeks; Bartlett H Hayes; Addison Gallery of American Art; Search for the real, and other essays (Cambridge, Massachusetts, M.I.T. Press, 1967) OCLC 1125858
- Lambirth, Andrew (2009-10-01). John Hoyland: Scatter the Devils. Unicorn Press. ISBN 978-1-906509-07-1.
- Tapié, Michel. Hans Hofmann : peintures 1962 : 23 avril-18 mai 1963. (Paris: Galerie Anderson-Mayer, 1963.) [exhibition catalogue and commentary] OCLC: 62515192
- Cynthia Goodman, Hans Hofmann : in conjunction with the exhibition "Hans Hofmann"; Whitney Museum of American Art, New York, June 20, 1990 – September 16, 1990; Center for the Fine Arts, Miami, November 1990 – January 1991; The Chrysler Museum, Norfolk, Virginia, February 1991 – April 1991 (München : Prestel, 1990.) ISBN 0-87427-070-7
- Marika Herskovic, American Abstract Expressionism of the 1950s An Illustrated Survey, (New York School Press, 2003.) ISBN 0-9677994-1-4. pp. 166–169
- —, New York School Abstract Expressionists Artists Choice by Artists, (New York School Press, 2000.) ISBN 0-9677994-0-6. p. 16; p. 37; pp. 182–185
- ART USA NOW Ed. by Lee Nordness;Vol.1, (The Viking Press, Inc., 1963. pp. 18–21
