= List of Federal Art Project artists =

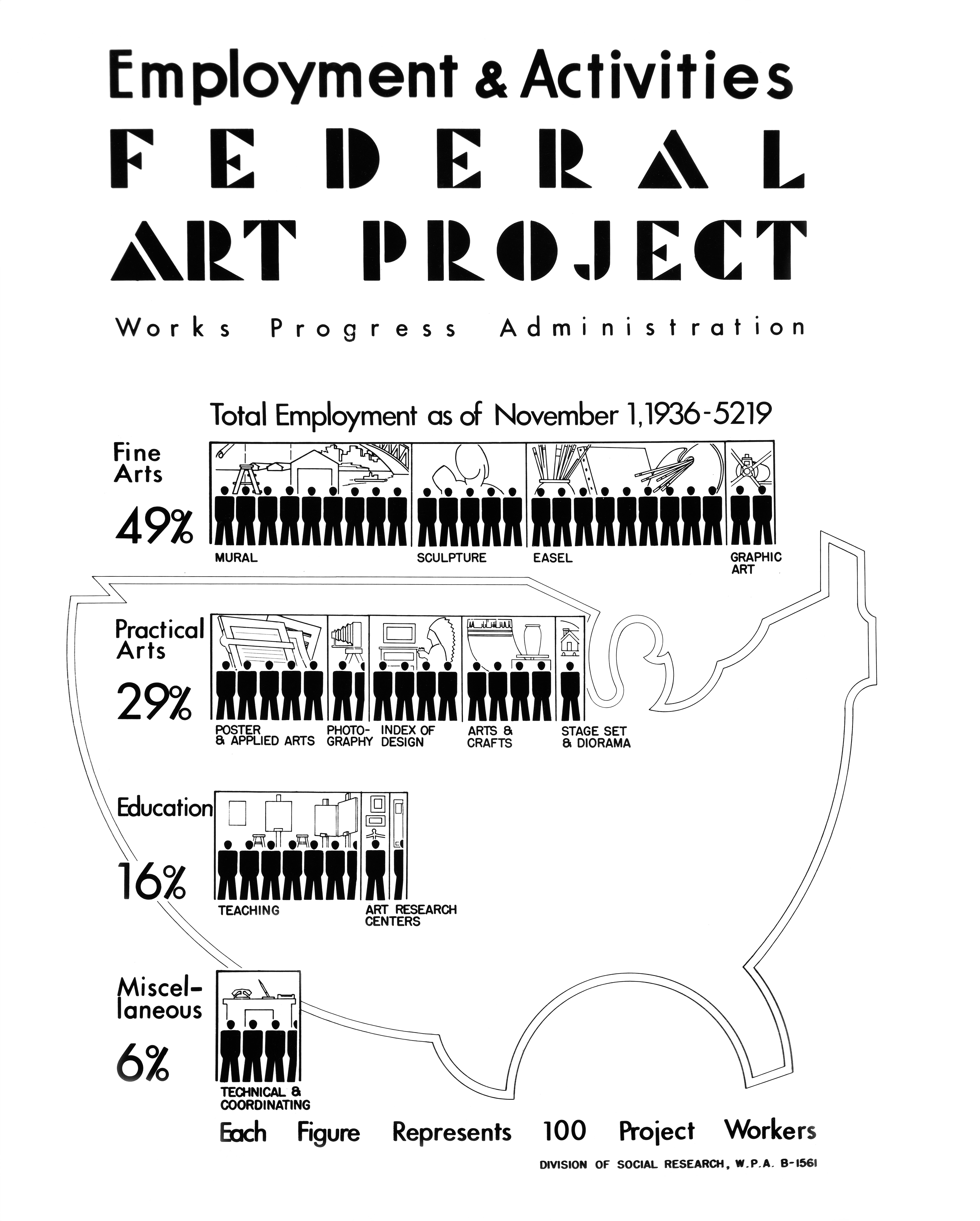
Poster summarizing Federal Art Project employment and activities (November 1, 1936)

The Federal Art Project (1935–1943) of the Works Progress Administration was the largest of the New Deal art projects. As many as 10,000 artists were employed to create murals, easel paintings, sculpture, graphic art, posters, photography, Index of American Design documentation, theatre scenic design, and arts and crafts. Artists were paid $23.60 a week; tax-supported patrons and institutions paid only for materials. The Federal Art Project also operated community art centers throughout the country where artists worked and educated others.

Artists who worked only for comparable but distinctly separate New Deal art projects administered by the United States Department of the Treasury (Note: New Deal art projects administered by the Treasury Department were the Public Works of Art Project (1933–34), Section of Painting and Sculpture (1934–43) and Treasury Relief Art Project (1935–38).) are not listed.

== A ==
- William Abbenseth
- Berenice Abbott
- Ida York Abelman
- Gertrude Abercrombie
- Benjamin Abramowitz
- Lillian Adelman
- Edward J. Ades
- Louis Agostini
- Abe Ajay
- Ernest Maxell Albert
- Ivan Albright
- Maxine Albro
- Anna Aloisi
- Simon Alshets
- Charles Alston
- Nicholas Amantea
- Giuseppe Amato
- Harold Ambellan
- Arthur Ames
- Jean Goodwin Ames
- Harold Anchel
- Carlos Anderson
- Nicholas Angeletti
- Charlotte Angus
- Alexis Arapoff
- Luis Arenal
- Bruce Ariss
- Emil Armin
- Victor Arnautoff
- Whitney Atchley
- Darrel Austin
- Ralph Austin
- Wendell Austin
- Sheva Ausubel
- Frances Avery
- George Avison
- Austin Ayers

== B ==
- John W. Backstrom
- Jozef Bakos
- Leah Balsham
- Gilbert Banever
- Henry Bannarn
- Belle Baranceanu
- Harold Barbour
- Phil Bard
- Patrociño Barela
- Erik Barger
- Ruth M. Barnes
- Will Barnet
- Norman Barr
- Oliver L. Barrett
- Charles Barrows
- Richmond Barthé
- Emily Barto
- Isabel Bate
- Herbert Bayer
- William Baziotes
- Lester Beall
- Klir Beck
- Fred G. Becker
- Harrison Begay
- Enid Bell
- Milton R. Bellin
- Daisy Maud Bellis
- Lampbert Bemelmann
- Rainey Bennett
- Edward Benoit
- John Howard Benson
- Leslie Benson
- Ahron Ben-Shmuel
- Andrew Berger
- Aaron Berkman
- Sarah Berman
- Henry Bernstein
- Jolan Gross Bettelheim
- Leon Bibel
- Robert Blackburn
- Mary Blahitka
- Arnold Blanch
- Lucile Blanch
- Marie Bleck
- Julius Bloch
- Lucienne Bloch
- Dorothy Block
- Walton Blodgett
- George Bobholz
- Vera Bock
- Aaron Bohrod
- Ilya Bolotowsky
- Samuel Bookatz
- Cameron Booth
- Mortimer Borne
- Ralph Boyer
- Dorr Bothwell
- Hugh Botts
- Tom Boutis
- Harry Bowden
- Raymond Sceptre Boynton
- Adele Brandeis
- Dayton Brandfield
- Louise Brann
- Gladys Brannigan
- Ben Braun
- Joan van Breeman
- Raymond Breinin
- Louis Breslow
- George T. Brewster
- Lester Bridaham
- Edgar Britton
- King D. Brock
- Manuel Bromberg
- James Brooks
- Bob Brown
- Samuel E. Brown
- Samuel J. Brown Jr.
- Byron Browne
- Helen Bell Bruton
- Ann Gene Buckley
- John Buczak
- Beniamino Bufano
- Charles Ragland Bunnell
- E. A. Burbank
- John E. Burdick
- Benjamin Burgoyne
- Robert W. Burke
- Selma Burke
- Leslie Bryan Burroughs
- Frank Butler
- Redmond Byron

== C ==
- Letterio Calapai
- Vincent Campanella
- Leon Carlin
- Leon Carroll
- Norman Carton
- Samuel Cashwan
- Thomas Cavaliere
- Giorgio Cavallon
- Daniel Celentano
- Pedro Cervántez
- Lucille Chabot
- Glenn Chamberlain
- Dane Chanase
- Ruth Chaney
- Edouard Chassaing
- Eugene Chodorow
- Fay Chong
- David Paul Chun
- Frank Cirigliano
- Claude Clark
- Paul Clemens
- Eleanor Coen
- Max Arthur Cohn
- Francis Colburn
- Vernon Herbert Coleman
- John Collins
- Pat Collins
- James H. P. Conlon
- George Constant
- Mariano Corda
- Jesse Cornplanter
- Richard V. Correll
- Eldzier Cortor
- Francis J. Costa
- Vito Covelli
- Arthur Covey
- Alfred D. Crimi
- Francis Criss
- Allan Crite
- Flora Crockett
- Robert Cronbach
- Beatrice Cuming
- John Steuart Curry
- Marian Curtis
- Philip Campbell Curtis

== D ==
- Warren Dahler
- June Dale
- Homer Dana
- Joseph Danysh
- Elizabeth Hoffman Dasch
- Abraham Mark Datz
- James Daugherty
- Stuart Davis
- Carson Davenport
- Hubert Davis
- Wyatt Davis
- Harold Mallette Dean
- Victor DeCarlo
- Emanuel DeColas
- Mathilde De Cordoba
- Elizabeth Deering
- Adolf Dehn
- Willem de Kooning
- Robert Delson
- Joseph De Martini
- Salvatore DeMaio
- Joseph De Mers
- Frederick Dertwiller
- Helen Blackmur Dickson
- Edward DiGennero
- Burgoyne Diller
- Nathaniel Dirk
- Isabella Ruth Doerfler
- Isami Doi
- Rex Dolmith
- Marguerite Redman Dorgeloh
- Adrian Dornbush
- Murna Dunkle
- Arthur E. Dunn
- Alexander Dux
- Mabel Dwight
- Carlos Dyer

== E ==
- George Frederic Earle
- Stuart Edie
- Emmet Edwards
- Ruth Egri
- Fritz Eichenberg
- Arthur Elder
- Martha Elliott
- Jacob Elshin
- Irene Emery
- George Pearse Ennis
- Angna Enters
- Arthur Esner
- Philip Evergood
- Marjorie Eakin-Sabre

== F ==
- Claire Falkenstein
- Dorathy Farr
- Harold Knickerbocker Faye
- Stanford Fenelle
- Louis Ferstadt
- Thyrsis Field
- Alexander Finta
- Thomas Flavell
- Joseph Fleck
- Anne Fletcher
- LeRoy Walter Flint
- Lawrence Flynn
- Seymour Fogel
- Paul Fontaine
- Donald Forbes
- Helen Katharine Forbes
- Horatio C. Forjohn
- Donald Forrer
- Karl Fortess
- Magnus Fossum
- Sydney Glen Fossum
- Charles Foster
- Alice Fowler
- David Fredenthal
- Herbert Frere
- Aline Fruhauf
- Rowena Fry
- Fritz Fuglister
- Lily Furedi

== G ==
- Michael J. Gallagher
- Paul H. Galvin
- Richard Galvin
- Emil Ganso
- Charles R. Gardner
- Leon Garland
- Adams Wirt Garrett
- Oronzo Gasparo
- Lee Gatch
- Helen Gaulois
- Gus Gay
- Marion Gaylord
- Amelia Geiger
- Todros Geller
- Aaron Gelman
- Enrico Gerbi
- Eugenie Gershoy
- Frank Gesner
- Howard Gibbs
- Isolde Therese Gilbert
- John Glenn
- Enrico Glicenstein
- Vincent Glinsky
- Albert Gold
- James L. Goldie
- Minetta Good
- Aaron Goodelman
- Bertram Goodman
- Job Goodman
- Boris Gorelick
- Rex Goreleigh
- Arshile Gorky
- Harry Gottlieb
- Blanche Grambs
- Morris Graves
- Samuel Green
- Isabelle Greenberger
- Balcomb Greene
- Marion Greenwood
- Laicita Gregg
- John W. Gregory
- Waylande Gregory
- Jack Greitzer
- Nils Gren
- Thayer Grimes
- A. L. Groll
- Elias Mandel Grossman
- Justin C. Gruelle
- Thomas Guidone
- O. Louis Guglielmi
- Alvin Gully
- Philip Guston
- James Guy
- Irving Guyer

== H ==
- Malcolm Hackney
- Edward Hagedorn
- Ernst Halberstadt
- Duane Haley
- Richard Halls
- Edith Hamlin
- Eugene E. Hannan
- Merlin C. Hardy
- Minna Harkavy
- Robert E. Harlow, Jr.
- George E. Harris
- Abraham Harriton
- Ernest H. Hart
- Marsden Hartley
- Walter Hartson
- Vertis Hayes
- Charles Heaney
- Howard Heath
- John P. Heins
- Knute Heldner
- Helen West Heller
- August Henkel
- Ralf Henricksen
- Samuel Hershey
- Edna Hershman
- Harry Herzog
- Magnus Colcord Heurlin
- William Hicks
- Gustave Hildebrand
- Hilaire Hiler
- Carrie Hill
- Willard Newman Hirsch
- Louis Hirshman
- Joseph Hochfeld
- Carl Hoeckner
- William Hoffman
- Raymond J. Holden
- Richard Hood
- Mary Hoover
- Donal Hord
- Axel Horn
- Milton Horn
- Allan Houser
- Joseph Hovell
- Len R. Howard
- Mary Howard
- Stephen Jerome Hoxie
- Torvald Arnst Hoyer
- Arthur G. Hull
- David W. Humphrey
- Frank Hunter
- Anna W. Huntington
- Marion Huse

== I ==
- Edgar Imler
- Eitaro Ishigaki

== J ==
- Mabel Wellington Jack
- Gordena Jackson
- Eli Jacobi
- Abraham Jacobs
- Emanuel Jacobson
- Edward L. Jansen
- Richard Jansen
- Harriet Jenkins
- Leonard Seweryn Jenkins
- Avery Johnson
- Edwin Boyd Johnson
- Sargent Claude Johnson
- Tom Loftin Johnson
- William H. Johnson
- Albertus Jones
- James Jones
- Lawrence A. Jones
- Rebecca Field Jones
- Robert M. Jones
- Shirley Julian
- Leonard D. Jungwirth
- Jeno Juszko

== K ==
- Reuben Kadish
- Sheffield Kagy
- Jacob Kainen
- Gerome Kamrowski
- George Kanelous
- Ben Kaplan
- David Karfunkle
- Nat Karson
- William Karp
- Hyman William Katz
- Irving Katzenstein
- Waldo Kaufer
- Andrene Kauffman
- Florence Kawa
- Louis Bertrand Rolston Keeler
- Carl Keksi
- Estelle Kellogg
- Albert Sumter Kelly
- Leon Kelly
- Karl Kelpe
- Paul Kelpe
- Luman P. Kelsey
- Arthur Kerrick
- Dmitri Kessel
- Walt Killam
- Roy E. King
- Troy Kinney
- Georgina Klitgaard
- Gene Kloss
- Karl Knaths
- Edwin B. Knutesen
- Walter Korder
- Alexander Kostellow
- Saul Kovner
- Benjamin Knotts
- Lee Krasner
- Romuald Kraus
- Erik Hans Krause
- Samuel Kravitt
- Kalman Kubinyi
- Paul Kucharyson
- Webster C. Kullberg
- Yasuo Kuniyoshi
- Lawrence Kupferman

== L ==
- Lucien Labaudt
- Louis LaBrecque
- Henry La Cagnina
- Robert Lachenmann
- Bancel La Farge
- Philip Lagana
- Oliver LaGrone
- Arthur Laing
- Robert Lambdin
- Chet La More
- Karl Lang
- Edward Laning
- Michael Lantz
- John LaQuatra
- Omer T. Lassonde
- Sidney Laufman
- Michael Lauretano
- Jacob Lawrence
- Harold Lawson
- Katherine S. Lawson
- Blanche Lazzell
- Tom Lea
- Lawrence Lebduska
- Joseph LeBoit
- William Robinson Leigh
- Harold Lehman
- Michael Lenson
- Julian E. Levi
- Jack Levine
- Herschel Levit
- Josephine Frankel Levy
- Edward Lewandowski
- Jennie Lewis
- Monty Lewis
- Norman Lewis
- Elba Lightfoot
- Ernest Limbach
- Russell Limbach
- Louis Linck
- Richard William Lindsey
- Henry Lion
- Abraham Lishinsky
- Nathaniel Little
- William Littlefield
- George Lloyd
- Lucile Lloyd
- Charles Locke
- Dorothy Loeb
- Michael Loew
- Thomas Gaetano LoMedico
- John Lonergan
- Frank W. Long
- Edward L. Loper, Sr.
- Francisco P. Lord
- Nat Lowell
- Margaret Lowengrund
- Louis Lozowick
- Gabriel Luchetti
- Ryah Ludins
- Helen Lundeberg
- Nan Lurie
- Douglas Lynch
- Matthew Lyons

== M ==
- Guy Maccoy
- Leon Makielski
- William McCracken
- Albert McCutcheon
- Stanton Macdonald-Wright
- Mae McFarland
- Irene McHugh
- Loren MacIver
- Harry Francis Mack
- Bruce McKain
- Aida McKenzie
- William McKillop
- Christopher McLaughlin
- Gregory McLoughlin
- James G. McManus
- George McNeil
- Lewis F. MacRitchie
- Claire Mahl
- Philip Malicoat
- Hans Manglesdorf
- Moissaye Marans
- Conrad Marca-Relli
- David Margolis
- George Marinko
- Kyra Markham
- Jack Markow
- James Marshall
- Margaret Marshall
- Fletcher Martin
- Floyd T. Martin
- Marvin Martin
- Michel Martino
- Mercedes Matter
- John Matulis
- Jan Matulka
- Austin Mecklem
- Clifton Meek
- Dina Melicov
- Paul Meltsner
- Harold Merriam
- Richard Merrick
- Hugh Mesibov
- Guido Metelli
- Herman Meyer
- Casimer Michalczyk
- Anne Michalov
- Katherine Milhous
- Raymond Milici
- Salvatore Milici
- Hugh Miller
- Clarence Millet
- Edward Millman
- A. Reid Mimsey
- Theodore Monaghan
- Edith Dale Monson
- Jo Mora
- F. Townsend Morgan
- Eugene Morley
- Carl Morris
- Eric Mose
- Max Mougel
- Roland Mousseau
- Elizabeth Moutal
- Lloyd Moylan
- Robert Muchley
- William Mues
- Bert Mullins
- Arthur Murphy
- M. Lois Murphy
- Vincent J. Murphy
- Hester Miller Murray
- Joseph D. Myers

== N ==
- Frank Nagy
- Helmuth Naumer
- Alice Neel
- Carl Gustaf Nelson
- Ralph Nelson
- Louise Nevelson
- James Michael Newell
- John Nichols
- Spencer Baird Nichols
- Frank S. Nicholson
- Jane Ninas
- Louis Nisanoff
- Ann Nooney
- Henry Allen Nord
- Ernest Ralph Norling
- William Norman
- Lois North
- Frank Nuderscher
- Myron Chester Nutting

== O ==
- Ann Rice O'Hanlon
- Elizabeth Olds
- Frederick E. Olmsted
- Frank K. Ominsky
- Frank Ormansky
- Elliot Orr
- Erel Osborn

== P ==
- Cano Pace
- Willard Paddock
- Anthony Paglinea
- Delos Palmer
- William C. Palmer
- Joseph Pandolfini
- Igor Pantuhoff
- Betty Waldo Parish
- Martin Partyka
- Alfred J. Parys
- Phillip Pavia
- Glenn Pearce
- Albert Pearson
- Augustus Hamilton Peck
- Albert Pels
- Irene Rice Pereira
- Fred Peterson
- Elizabeth Shannon Phillips
- Girolamo Piccoli
- Charles Pollock
- James Arlin Pollock
- Jackson Pollock
- Theodore C. Polos
- Charles Polowetski
- Julius John Pommer
- Charles E. Pont
- Vincent Popolizio
- Isadore Possoff
- George Post
- Herbert W. Pratt
- Gregorio Prestopino
- Clayton Sumner Price
- Arnold Pyle
- Leonard Pytlak

== Q ==
- Walter Quirt

== R ==
- Mac Raboy
- Angelo Racioppi
- Joseph Rajer
- Fosden Ransom
- Frank J. Raymond
- Anton Refregier
- Paul Reilly
- Harry R. Rein
- Salvatore Reina
- Ad Reinhardt
- Charles Reinike
- Philip Reisman
- Manuel R. Regalado
- Andrée Rexroth
- Misha Reznikoff
- Mischa Richter
- Dan Rico
- James Ridolfo
- Mabel Ritter
- Diego Rivera
- José de Rivera
- Jack Rivolta
- Red Robin
- Hugo Robus
- Emanuel Glicen Romano
- Fingal Rosenquist
- Louis Ross
- Sanford Ross
- Girard Rossi
- Vincent Rossi
- Mark Rothko
- Jerome Henry Rothstein
- Peter Rotier
- Albert Ruby
- Joseph Rugolo
- Alexander Rummler
- Rosa Rush
- Michele Russo
- Dorothy Rutka
- Frank Rutkoski

== S ==
- Charles L. Sallée Jr.
- Paul E. Saling
- Isaac Jacob Sanger
- William Sanger
- Richard Sargent
- Martha Watson Sauer
- Augusta Savage
- Archibald D. Sawyer
- Carl Saxild
- Concetta Scaravaglione
- Joseph Scarrozzo
- Louis Schanker
- Bernard P. Schardt
- Edwin Scheier
- Mary Scheier
- Heinrich Schlichting
- Carl Schmitt
- Arlo Schmitz
- Edward Schoenberger
- Joseph Schork
- George Schreiber
- Earl Schuler
- Lester Schwartz
- Rubin Schwartz
- William S. Schwartz
- Stanley Scott
- Georgette Seabrooke
- Elinor Sears
- Charles Sebree
- Alice Selinkoff
- Alfred A. Sessler
- Alfredo Sever
- Ben Shahn
- Lillian Shaw
- Glenn Sheckels
- Hazel Sheckler
- George Shellhase
- Effim H. Sherman
- Francis Bernard Shields
- Harry Shokler
- Anatol Shulkin
- William Howard Shuster
- Louis Siegriest
- Claire Silber
- Lila Sinclair
- William Earl Singer
- Mitchell Siporin
- Arba Skidmore
- Raymond Skolfield
- Henry Skreczko
- John French Sloan
- Thomas O'Connor Sloane
- A. D. Smit
- Erik Johan Smith
- Margery Hoffman Smith
- Marshall Smith
- Phillip Smith
- Yngve Soderberg
- William Sommer
- Isaac Soyer
- Moses Soyer
- Raphael Soyer
- Russell Speakman
- Max Spivak
- Clay Edgar Spohn
- Ralph Stackpole
- Alexander R. Stavenitz
- Jerome Stavola
- Cesare Stea
- Bernard Joseph Steffen
- Walter Steinhart
- Joseph Stella
- John Stenvall
- Eunice Stephenson
- Harry Sternberg
- Hugh Stevenson
- Elinor Stone
- Frances Strain
- Francis Sullivan
- Charles Frederick Surendorf
- Richard Sussman
- Sakari Suzuki
- Albert Swinden

== T ==
- John Tabaczuk
- Rufino Tamayo
- Chuzo Tamotzu
- Harry LeRoy Taskey
- Jean Taylor
- John W. Taylor
- Elizabeth Terrell
- Victor Thall
- Robert Garret Thew
- Lenore Thomas
- Lars Thorsen
- Dox Thrash
- Charles Winstanley Thwaites
- Francis Thwing
- Archie Tillinghast
- Alton Tobey
- Mark Tobey
- A. J. Tock
- Manuel Tolegian
- Henry W. Tomlinson
- Harry Everett Townsend
- Lee Townsend
- Elizabeth Tracy
- William H. Traher
- Grace A. Treadwell
- Eugene Trentham
- Nahum Tschacbasov
- H. B. Tshudy
- Raymond Turner
- Julius Twohy

== U ==
- Edward Buk Ulreich
- Bumpei Usul
- Frank Utpatel

== V ==
- Jacques Van Aalten
- Joan Van Breeman
- Stuyvesant Van Veen
- Charles Vander Sluis
- Dorothy Varian
- Joseph Vavak
- Anthony Velonis
- Charles Verschuuren
- Cornelia Vetter
- Frede Vidar
- Pauline Vinson
- Joseph Vogel
- Herman Volz
- T. F. Gustave Von Groschwitz
- John Von Wicht

== W ==
- Helen Wagner
- John Wagner
- Theodore Wahl
- Robert C. Wakeman
- John Augustus Walker
- John Walley
- Marion Walton
- Hyman J. Warsager
- Blanche Waterbury
- Herbert Waters
- Albert James Webb
- Roswell Weidner
- James Weiland
- Isadore Weiner
- Rudolph Weisenborn
- Frederick Weiss
- Julius Weiss
- Oscar Weissbuch
- Martin Weitzman
- Howard Weld
- Paul Weller
- Louise Welsh
- Maria Weniger
- George West
- Wayne White
- J. Scott Williams
- Arnold Wiltz
- Andrew Winter
- Ted Witonski
- Stanley Wood
- Rodney Woodson
- Robert Woolsey
- Frederick Wright
- Lloyd William Wulf

== X ==
- Jean Xceron
- Alfredo Ximenez

== Y ==
- Edgar Yaeger
- Basil Yurchenco

== Z ==
- Bernard Zakheim
- Karl Zerbe
- Judy Zemnick
- Gyula Zilzer
- Santos Zingale
- William Zorach
- Harold Zussin

== Gallery ==
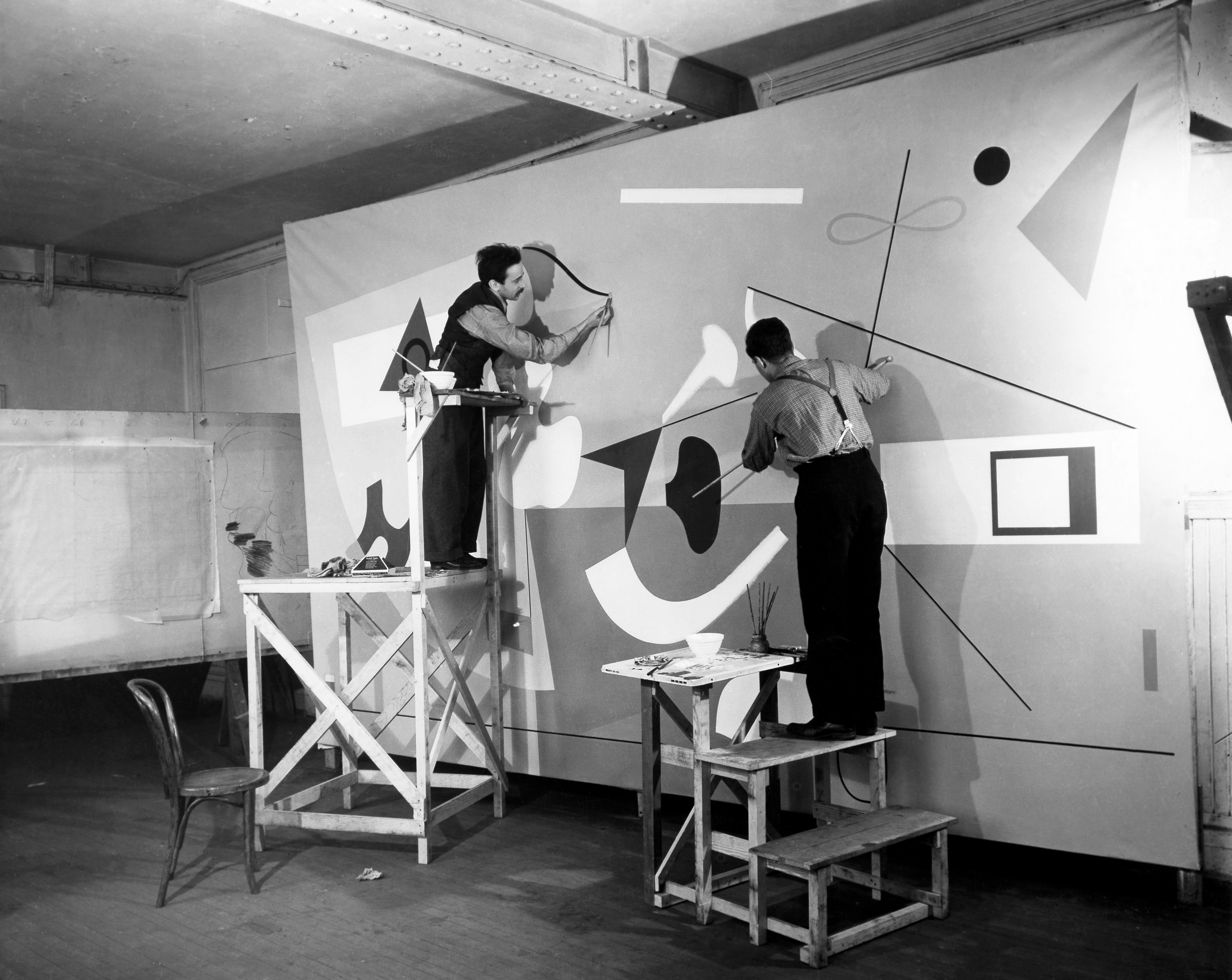
Ilya Bolotowsky's WPA mural for the Hall of Medical Sciences at the 1939 New York World's Fair — destroyed, like all of the art, when the fair closed

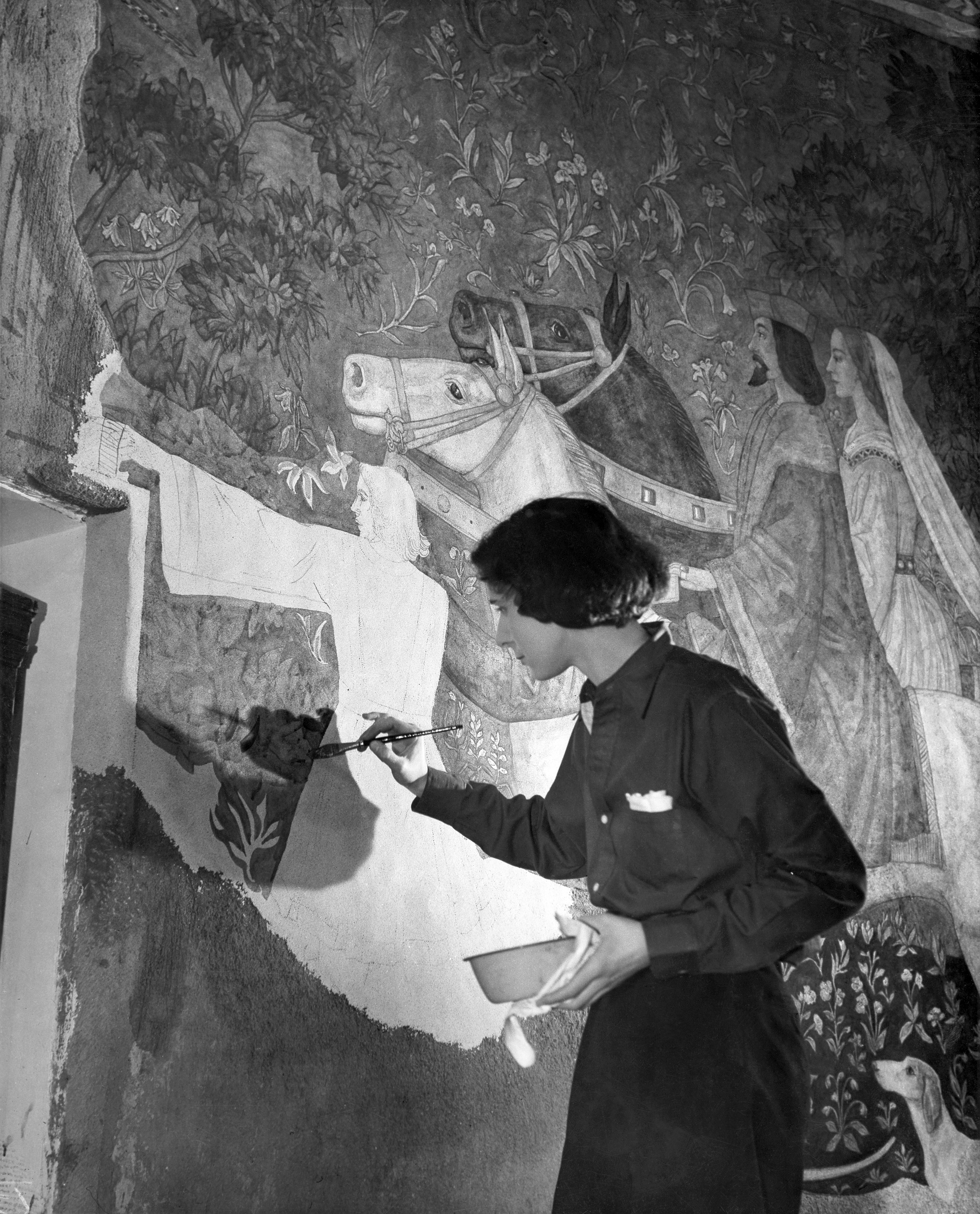
Louise Brann painting frescos for the Mount Vernon Public Library (1936), inspired by the 15th-century tapestry series, The Lady and the Unicorn

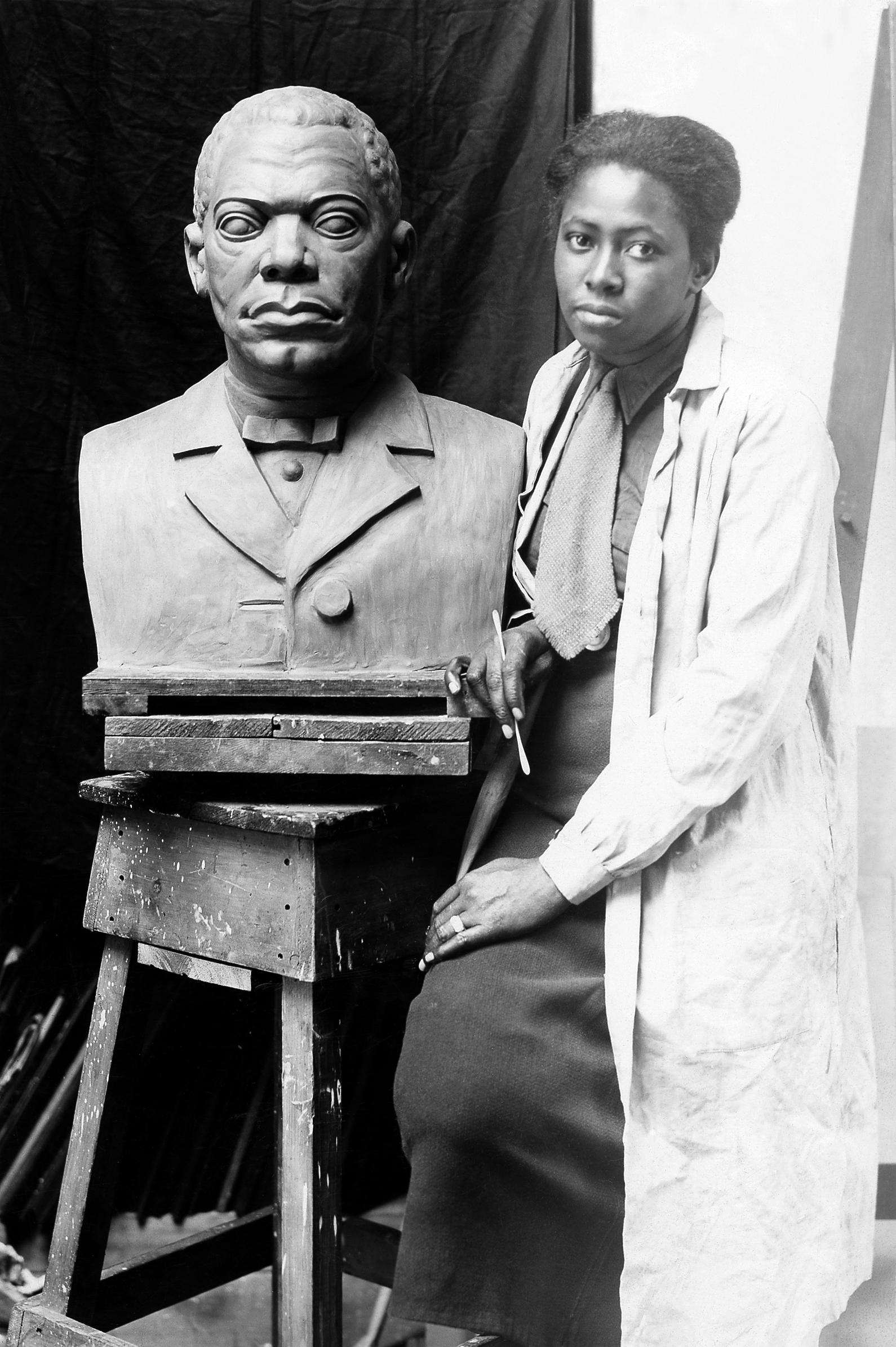
Federal Art Project sculptor Selma Burke with portrait bust of Booker T. Washington (1935)

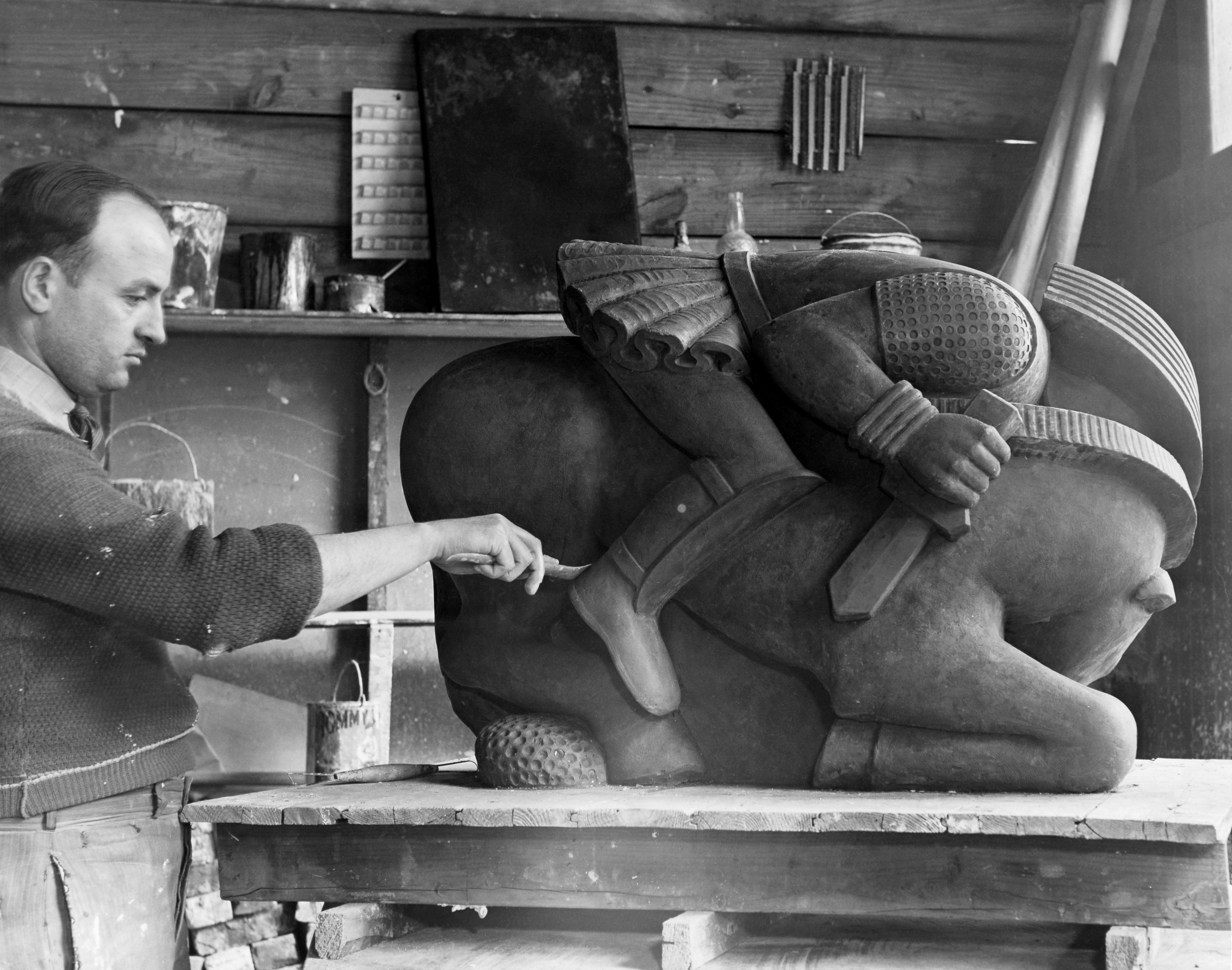
Waylande Gregory working on one of the six ceramic figures comprised in the WPA sculptural fountain, Light Dispelling Darkness (1937), at Roosevelt Park in Edison, New Jersey

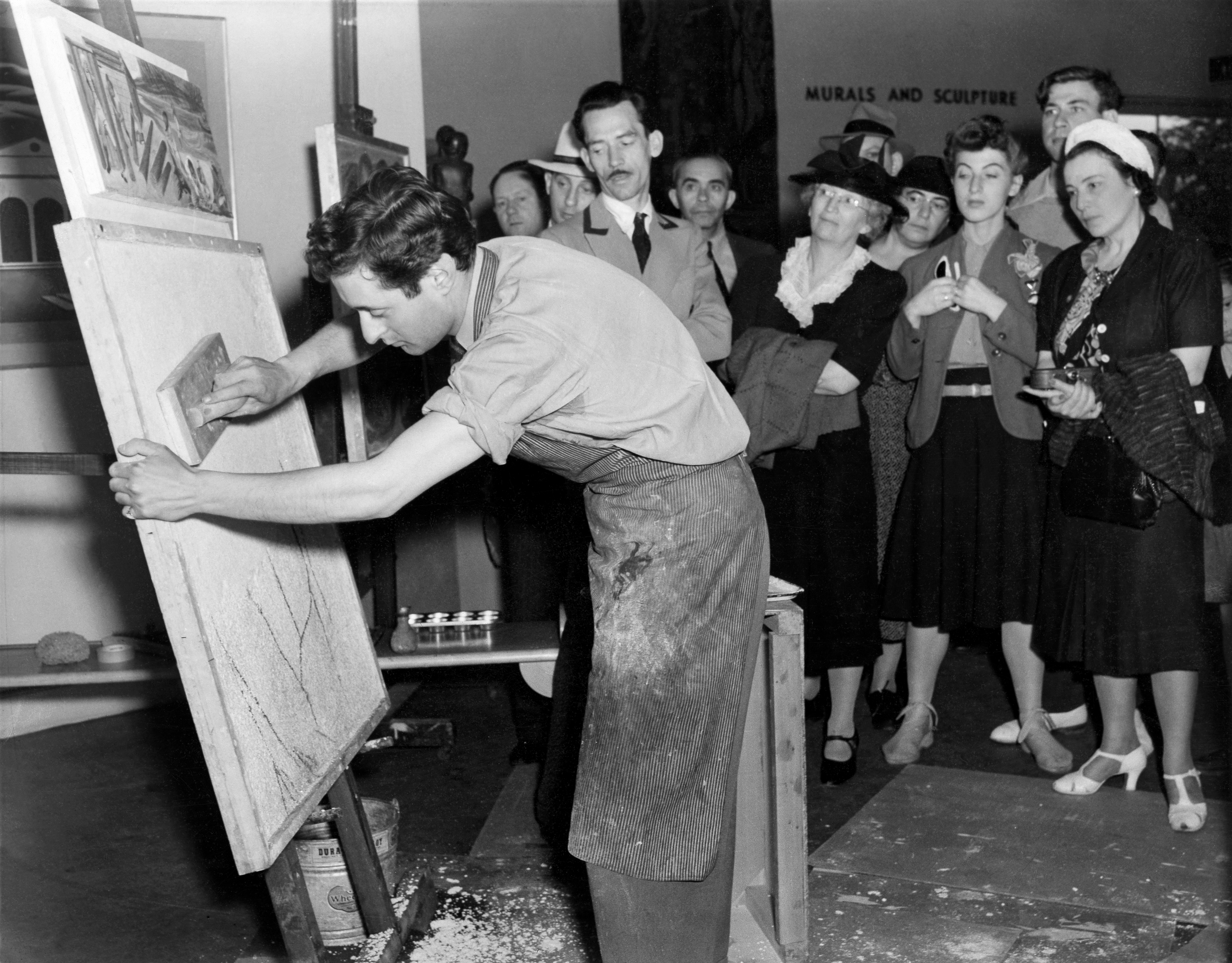
WPA muralist Axel Horn demonstrates how to make a fresco in the main gallery of the American Art Today Building at the 1939 New York World's Fair (1940)

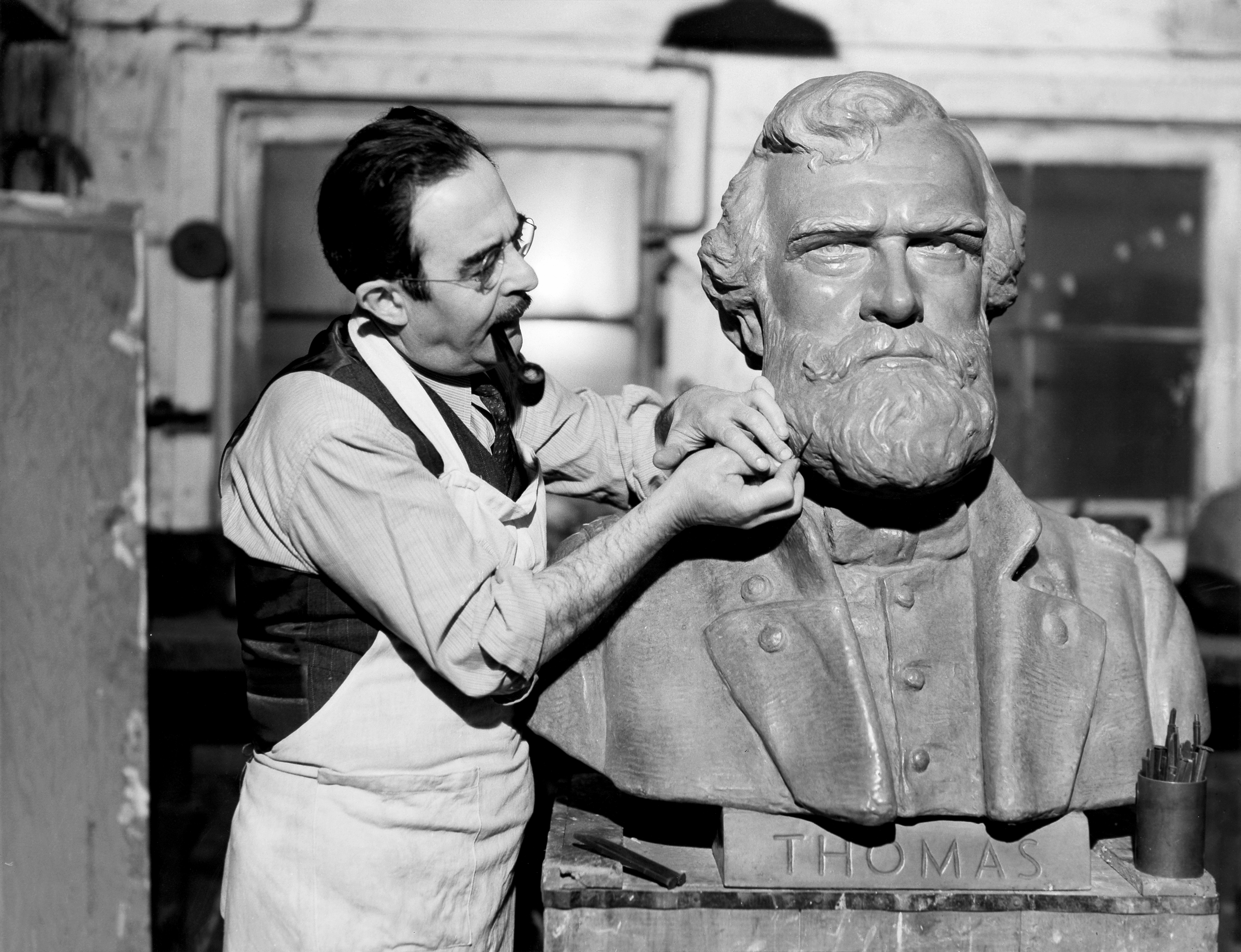
Jeno Juszko with his bronze sculpture of General George Henry Thomas, one of five busts of Civil War generals commissioned for the crypt of Grant's Tomb as part of the WPA restoration (1939)

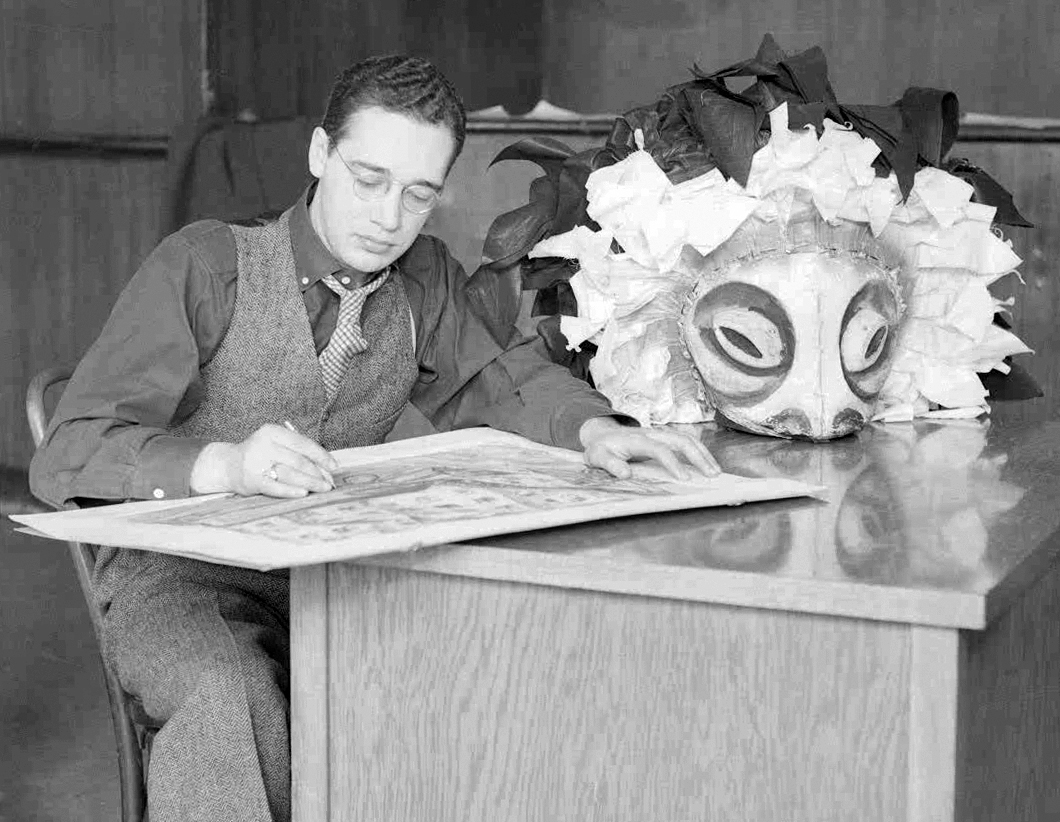
Nat Karson designed settings and costumes for Orson Welles's productions of Macbeth and Horse Eats Hat, sponsored by the Federal Theatre Project and Federal Art Project

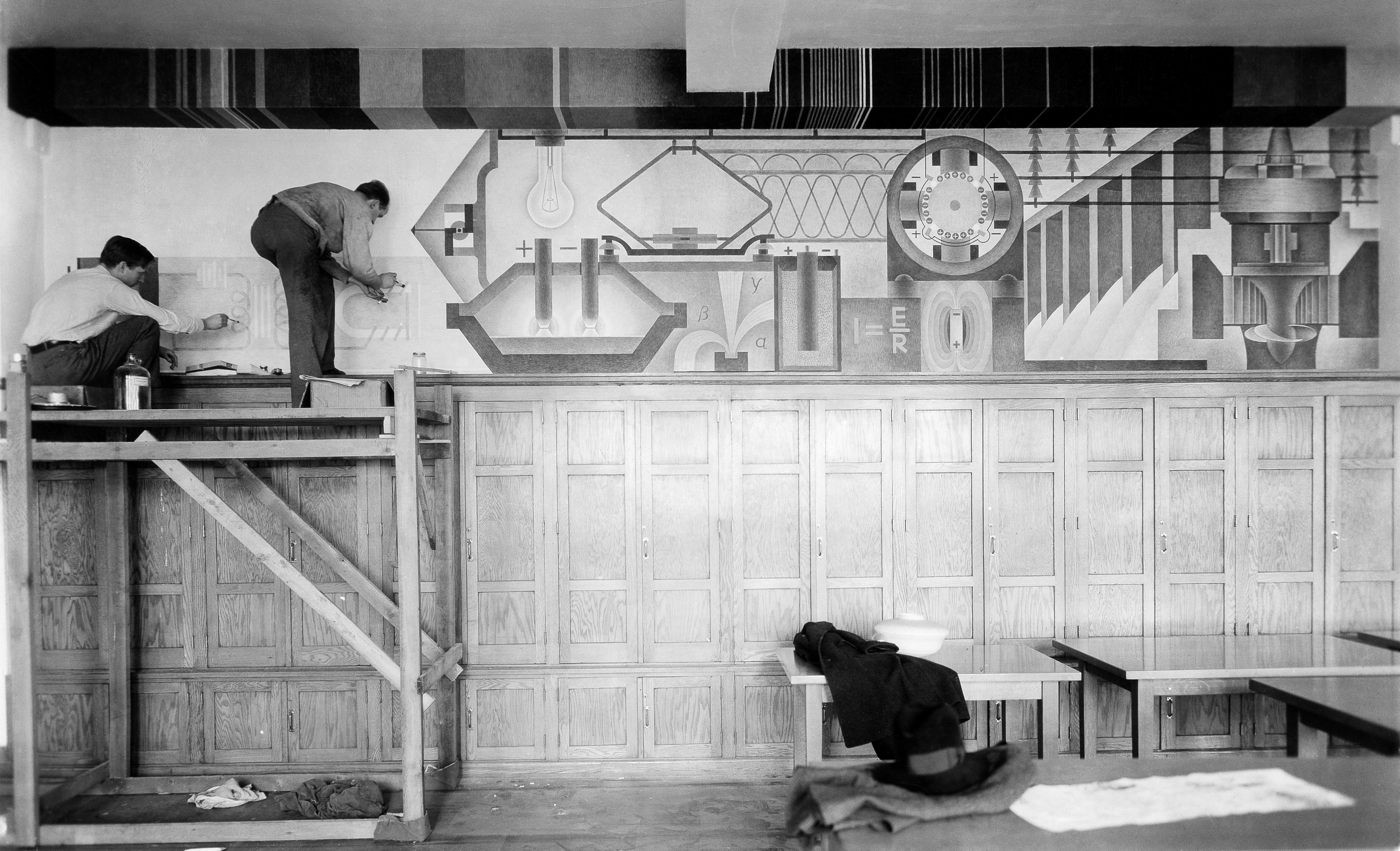
Eric Mose at work on his fresco, Power (1936), in the library of Samuel Gompers Industrial High School for Boys in the Bronx, New York

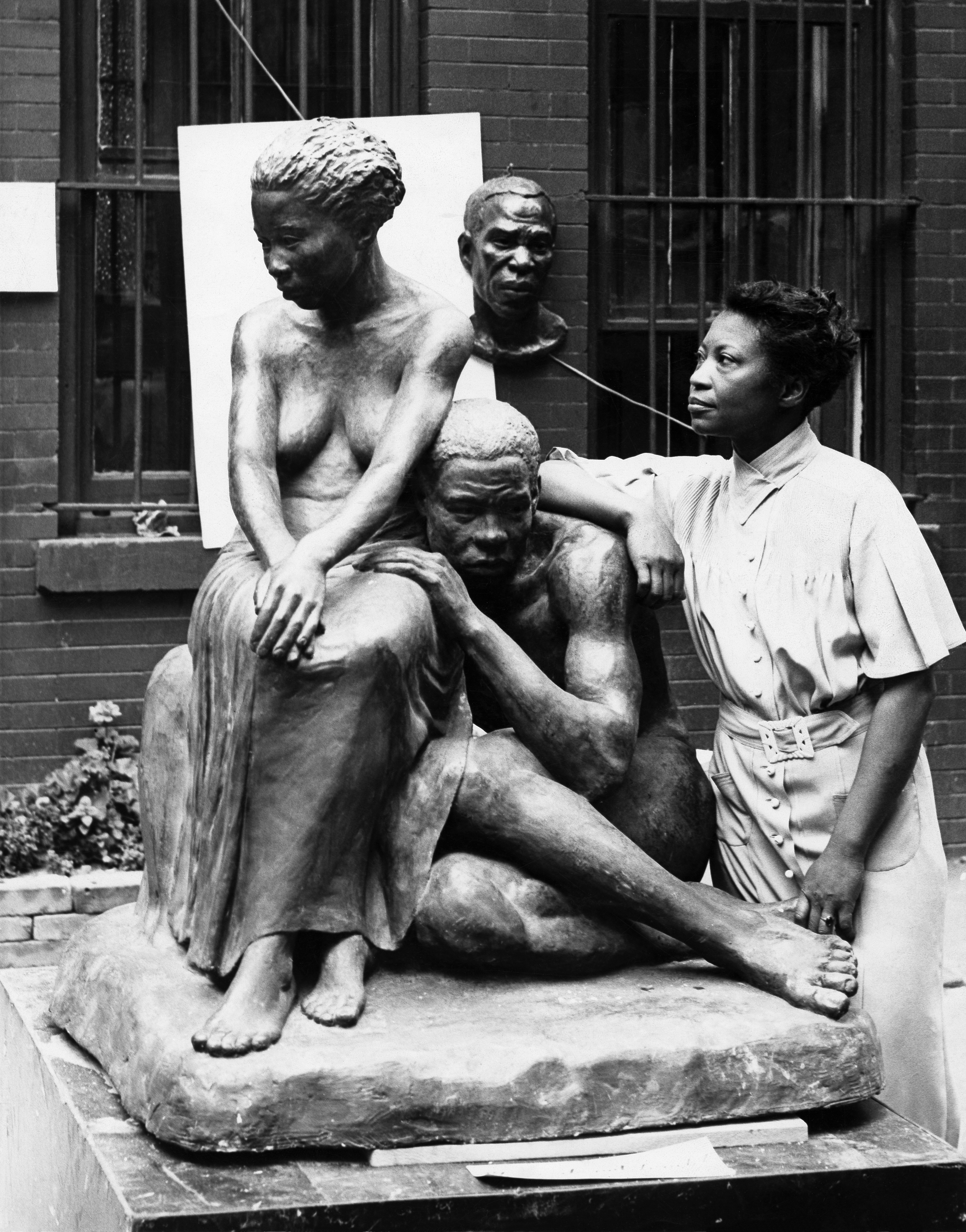
Augusta Savage, founder of the Harlem Community Art Center (1937–42)

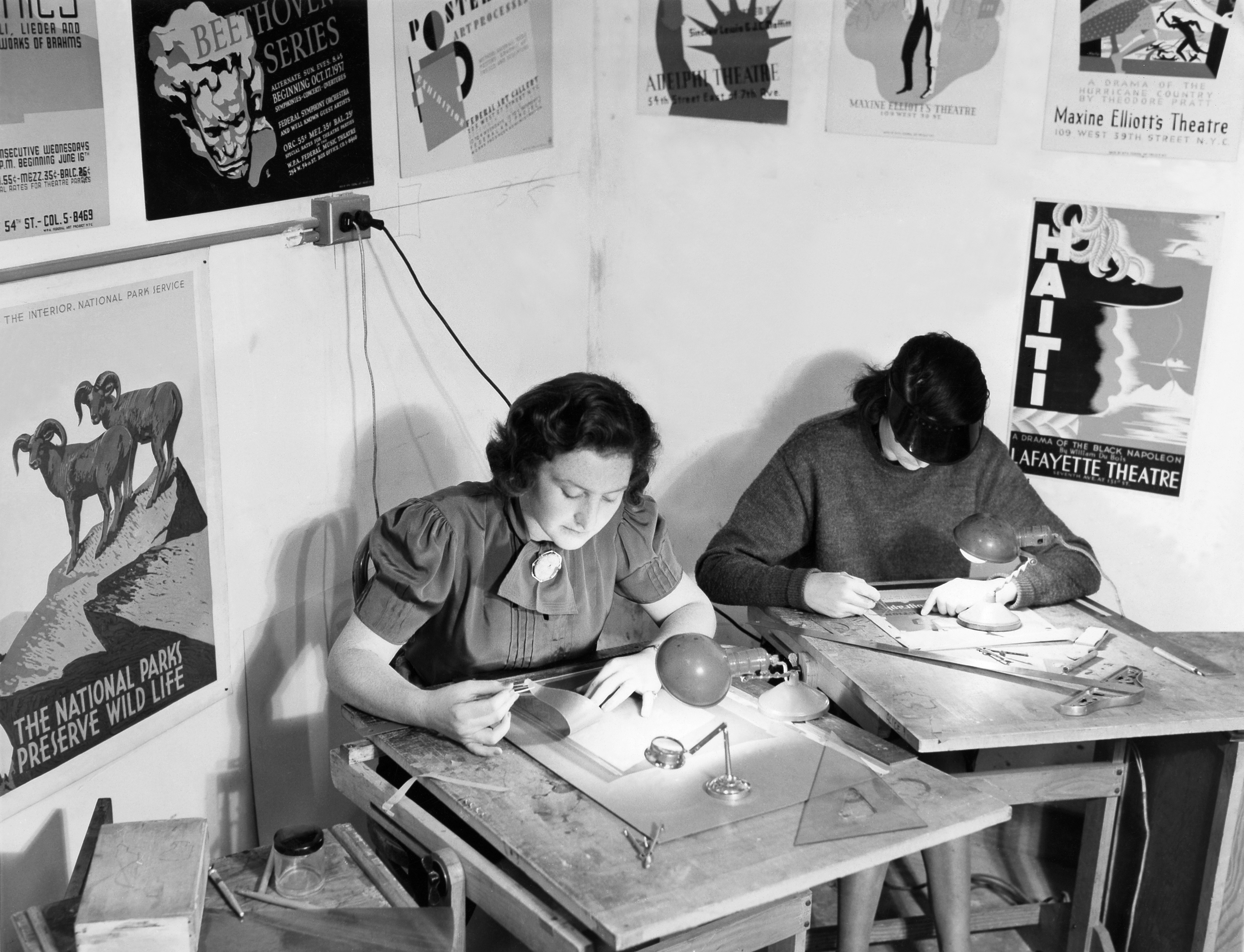
Alice Selinkoff prepares designs for silkscreen at the Federal Art Project poster workshop in New York City

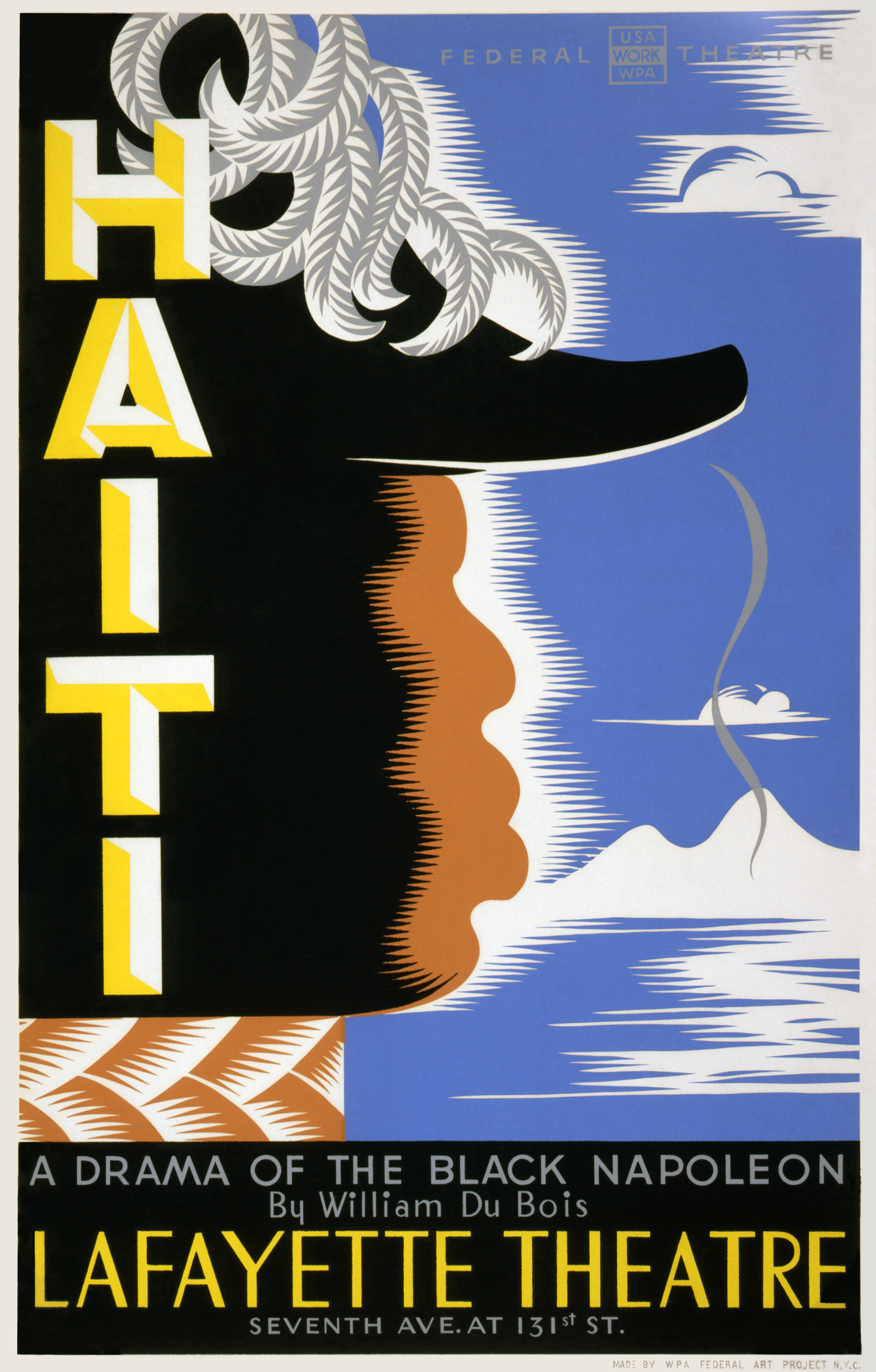
Poster for William DuBois' Haiti (1938) designed by Vera Bock

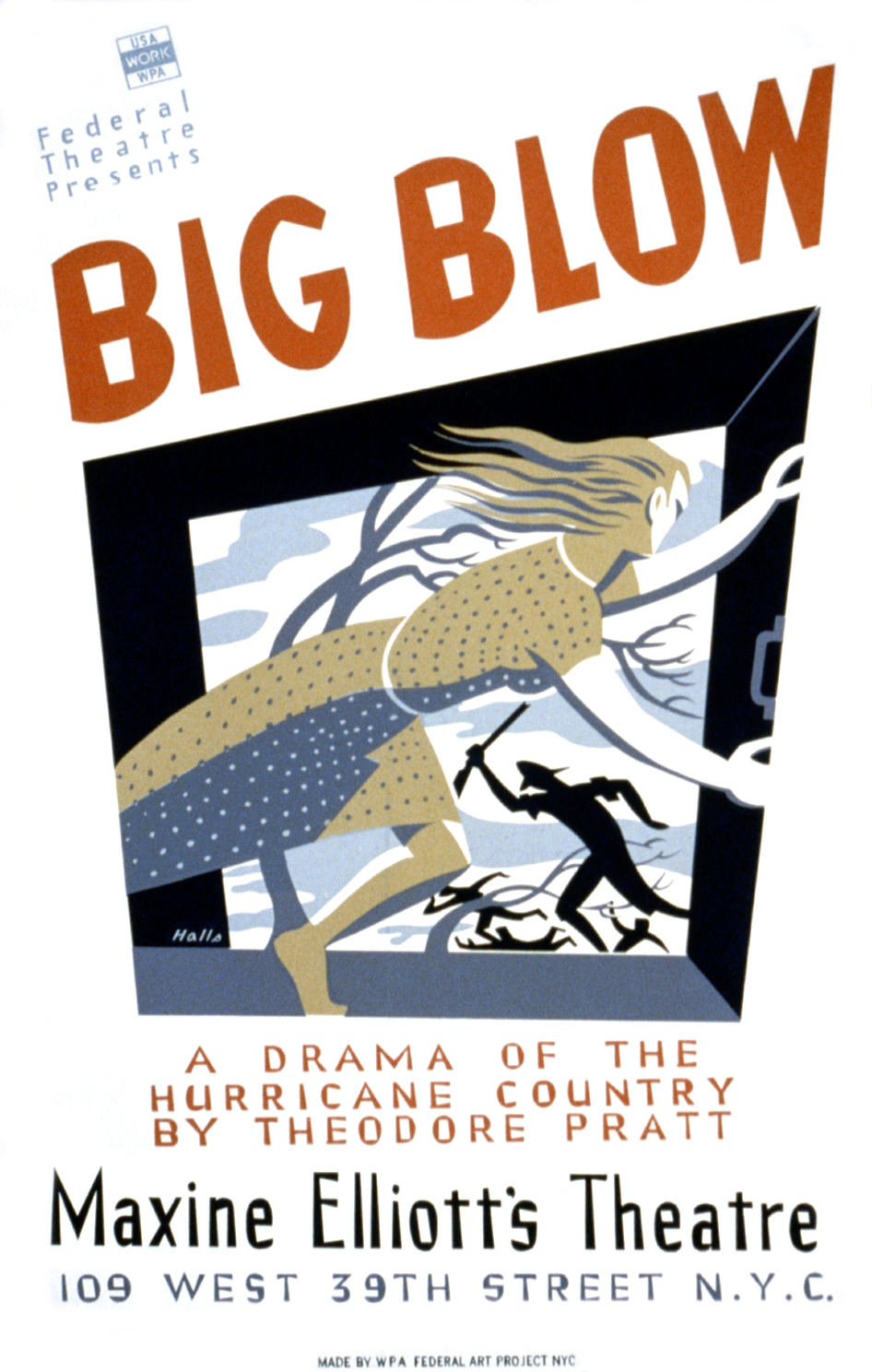
Poster for Theodore Pratt's The Big Blow (1938) designed by Richard Halls

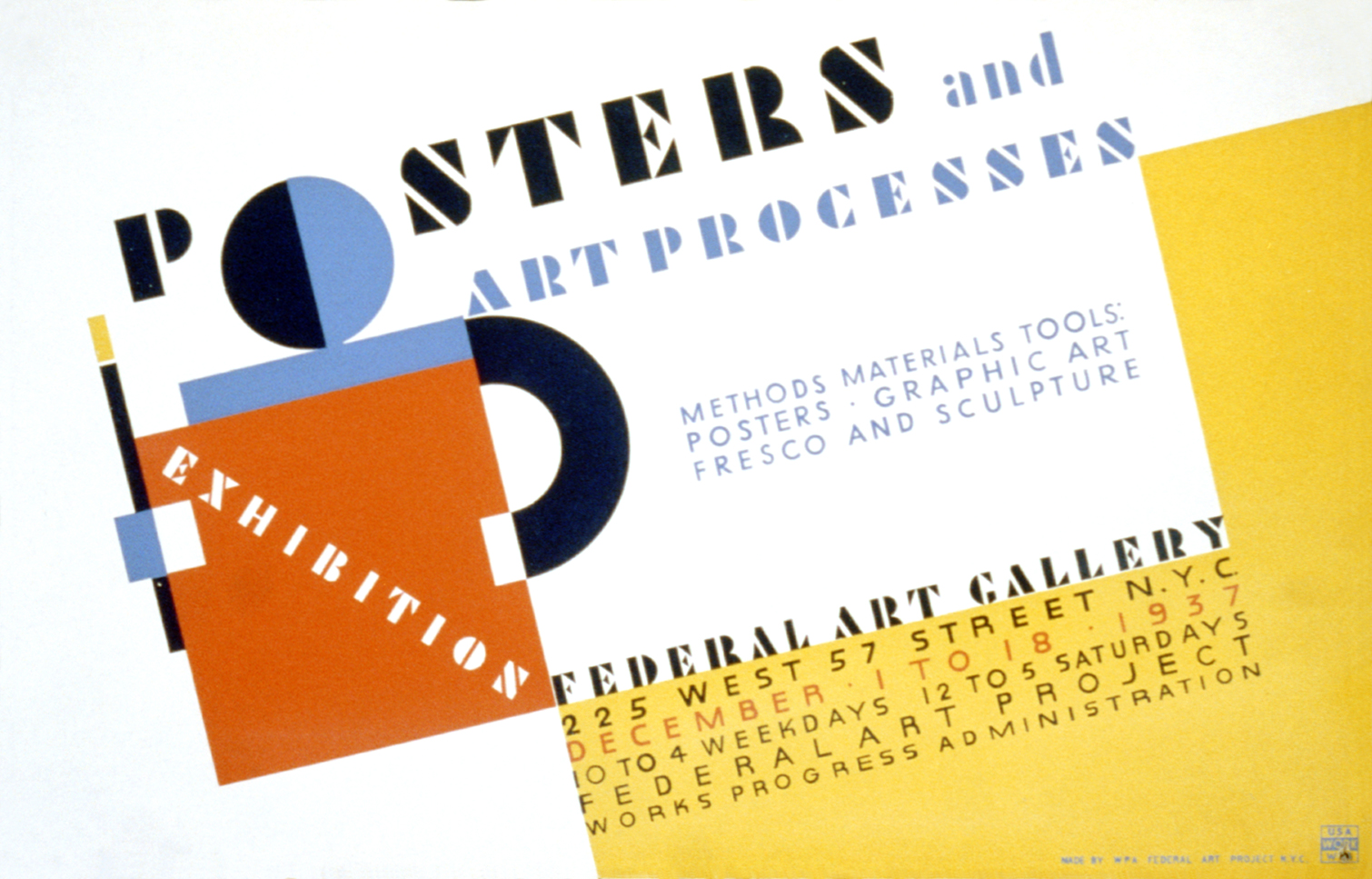
Poster for an exhibition at New York's Federal Art Gallery (1937) designed by Richard Floethe

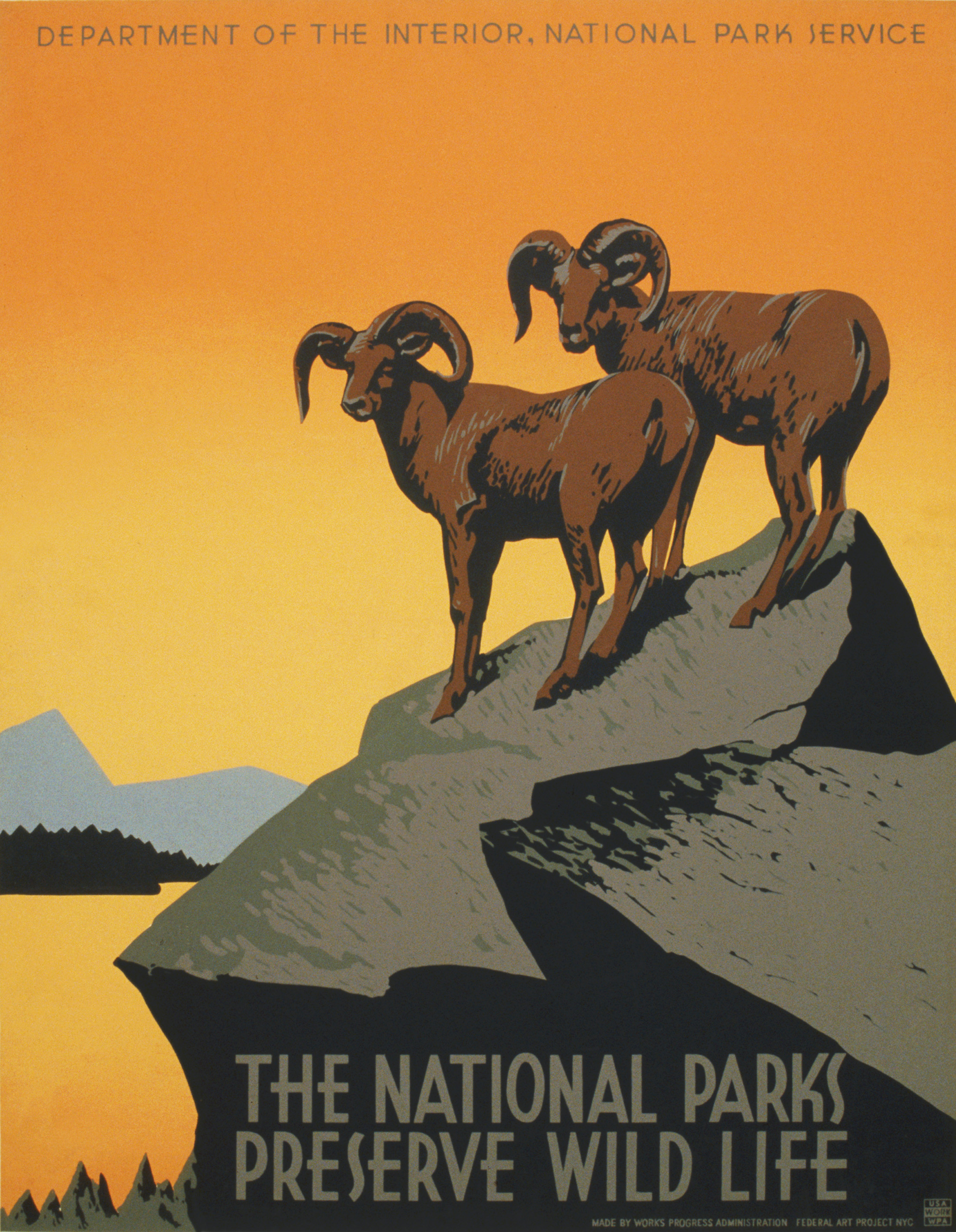
National Park Service poster designed by J. Hirt

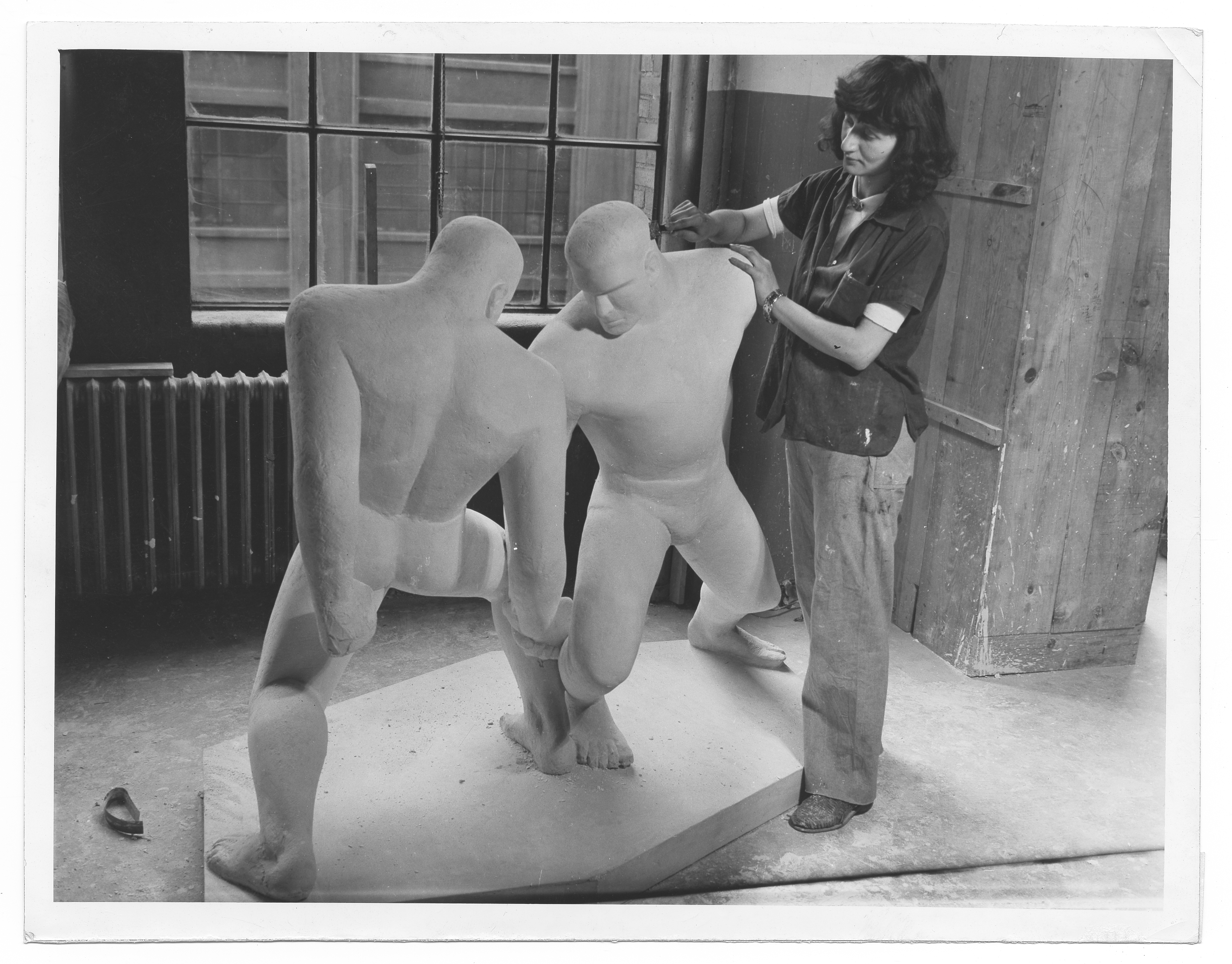
Josephine Frankel Levy working on her sculpture "The Wrestlers"
