= Elizabeth Moutal =

Elizabeth Moutal making a color note sketch in Boston

Elizabeth Moutal (née McMillin, later Beckwith, 1909–2000) was an American artist known for her watercolor using graphite, gouache, and colored pencils. 41 of her works created for the Index of American Design are in the collection of the National Gallery of Art. Her watercolors were included in the exhibition "New Horizons in American Art" at the Museum of Modern Art (MoMA) in 1936. The checklist for that exhibition listed four of her drawings:

- Crewel-embroidered chair-seat, 17th century
- Crewel embroidery, 17th century
- Five Shaker textiles, 1800-75
- Shaker glove
