= Isadore Possoff =

American artist

Isadore Possoff (1908–1972) was an American printmaker known for the posters he created for the Works Progress Administration. His work is in the Philadelphia Museum of Art and the online collection of the Free Library of Philadelphia.

In 2022 his work was included in the exhibition Macho Men: Hypermasculinity in Dutch & American Prints at the Philadelphia Museum of Art.

The Free Library of Philadelphia lists Possoff among the artists represented in its web-only exhibition WPA Posters from the Pennsylvania Federal Art Project, which features posters made between 1936 and 1943 by artists working for the Pennsylvania Federal Art Project.

== Gallery ==
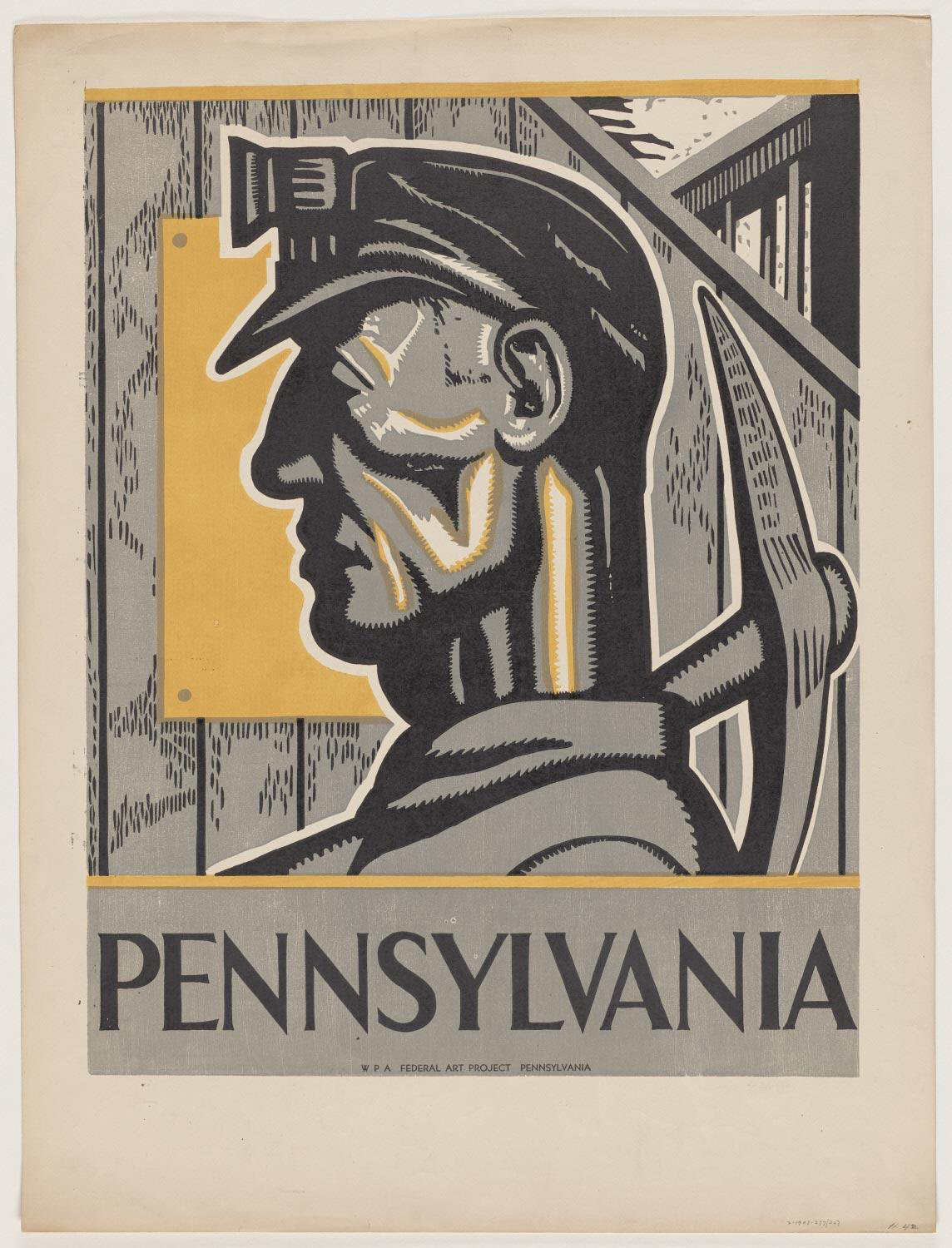
Pennsylvania Coal Miner, 1936 or 1937

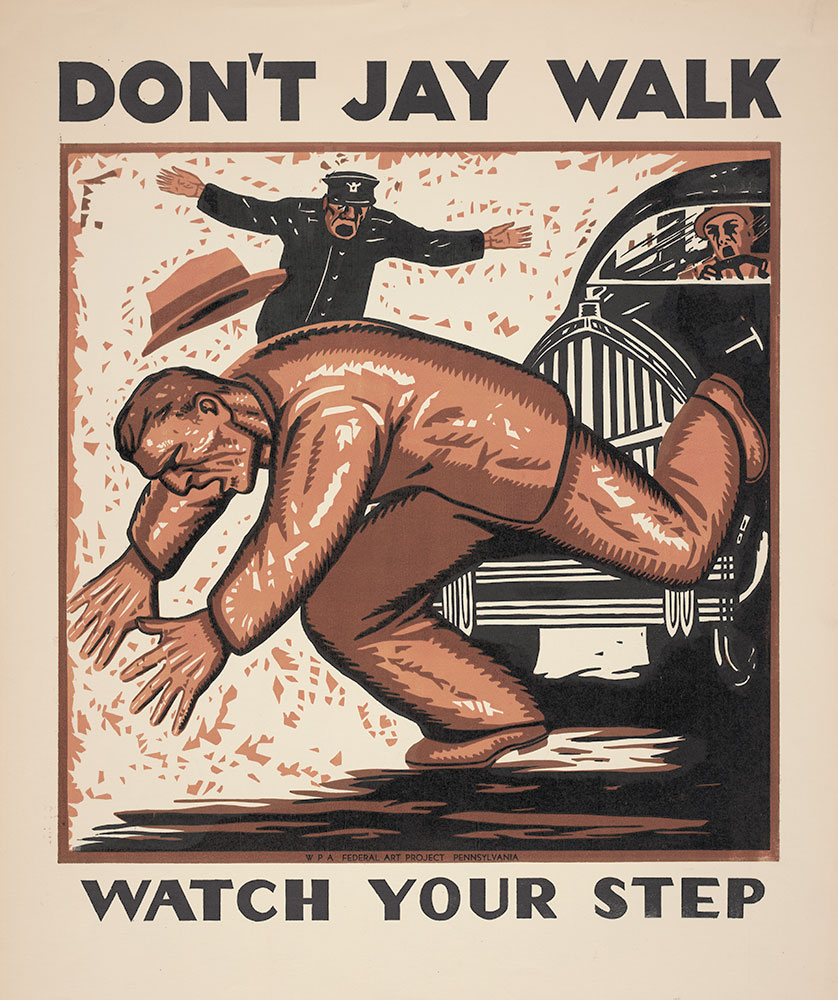
Don't Jay Walk - Watch Your Step, c. 1936

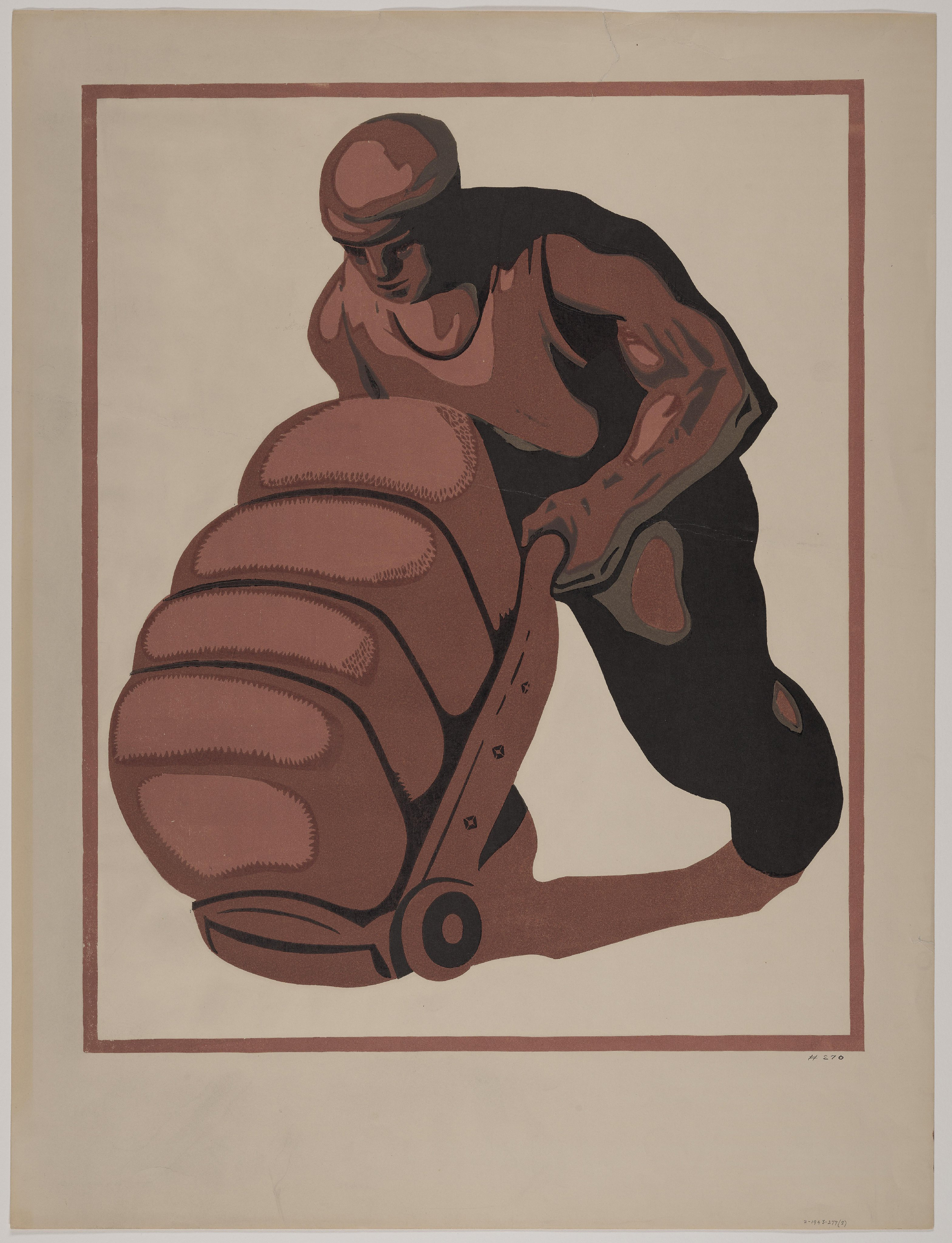
Workman Pushing Four Bundles, c. 1936-1941
