= Mabel Ritter =

Mabel Ritter, Purse, c. 1936, Index of American Design, National Gallery of Art

Mabel Ritter (21 April 1907 – October 1987) was an American artist and art teacher, known for her watercolor, graphite, and gouache works on paper. Eleven watercolors created by Ritter for the Index of American Design are in the collection of the National Gallery of Art. Ritter's rendering of a beaded purse was included in the exhibition New Horizons in American Art at the Museum of Modern Art in 1936.

Mabel Ritter was also known as Mabel Williams or Maybelle Williams. She may have been a daughter of James Williams and Lucy Goodwin Williams, born 21 April 1907 in Gadsden, Richland County, South Carolina, and died in October 1987.
