= Isabella Doerfler =

American artist

Isabella Ruth Doerfler
- Born: 1883; Meriden, Connecticut, US
- Died: November 15, 1954 (aged 70–71)
- Education: Yale School of Art
- Known for: Watercolors
- Patrons: Federal Arts Project

Isabella Ruth Doerfler (1883–1954) was a Connecticut-based American artist who worked for the Federal Arts Project in the 1930s. She was “one of the best renderers of textiles in New England.” Twenty of her watercolors are held in the permanent collections of the National Gallery of Art.

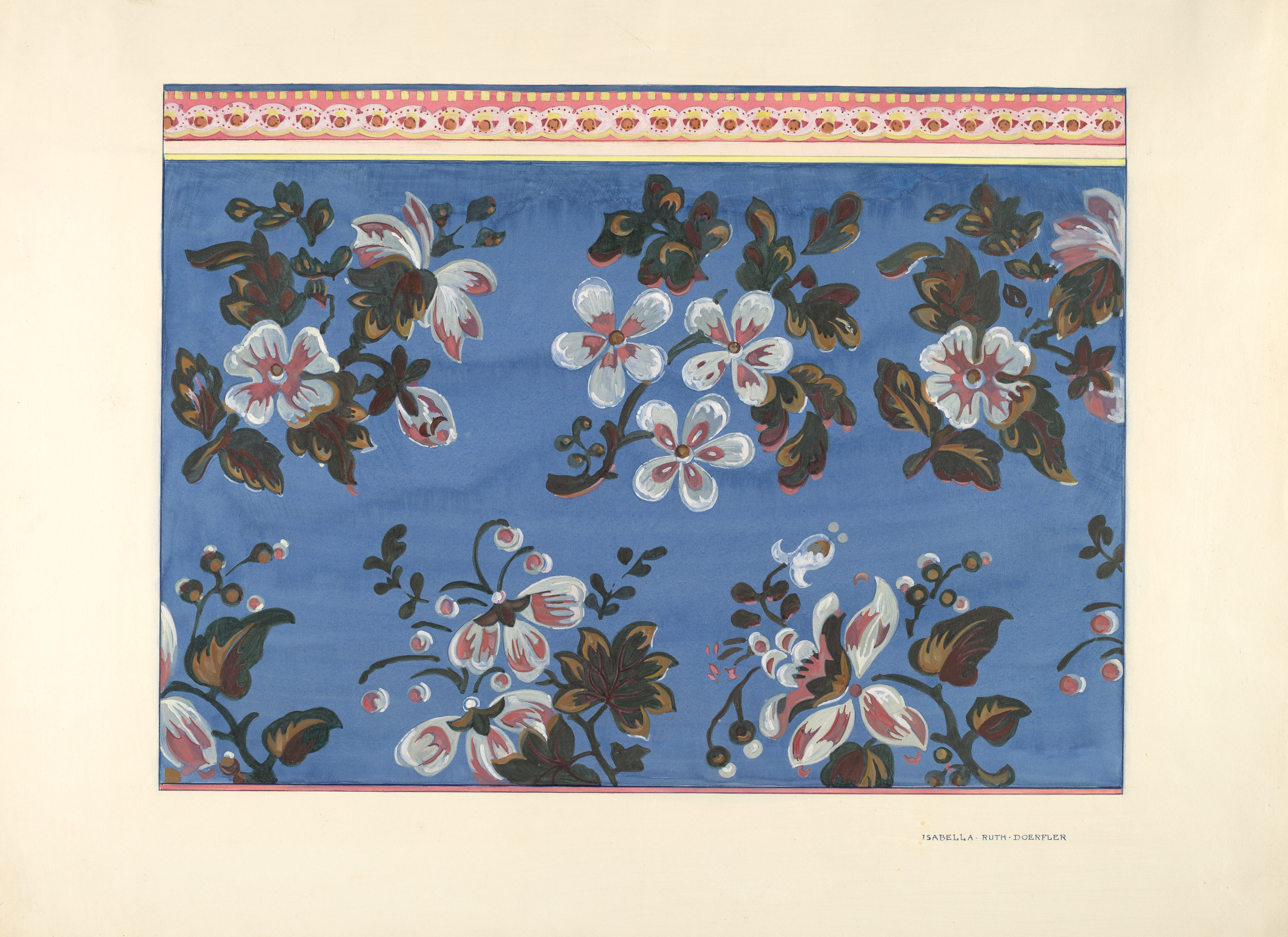
Bandbox design by Doerfler c. 1937

Born in Meriden, Connecticut, Doerfler graduated from the Yale School of Art in 1909. A member of the Arts and Crafts Association of Meriden and the Association of Connecticut Artists, she taught school, illustrated children's books, decorated antiques, and designed for publishing houses. In 1936, Doerfler contributed to the Index of American Design. Her WPA-commissioned works were displayed in the Undercliff Sanatorium, the Soldiers' Home in Rocky Hill, the Connecticut Farm for Women, Norwich State Hospital, Connecticut State College, and West Hartford public schools. During World War II, she worked in the mechanical drawing department of a defense factory. Doerfler died on November 15, 1954, at the age of 71.
