= Abraham Mark Datz =

Abraham Mark Datz (1889-1969) was a Russian-born American etcher and painter. His work is in the permanent collections of the Metropolitan Museum of Art, Lehigh University the Smithsonian American Art Museum, and the Whitney Museum of American Art.

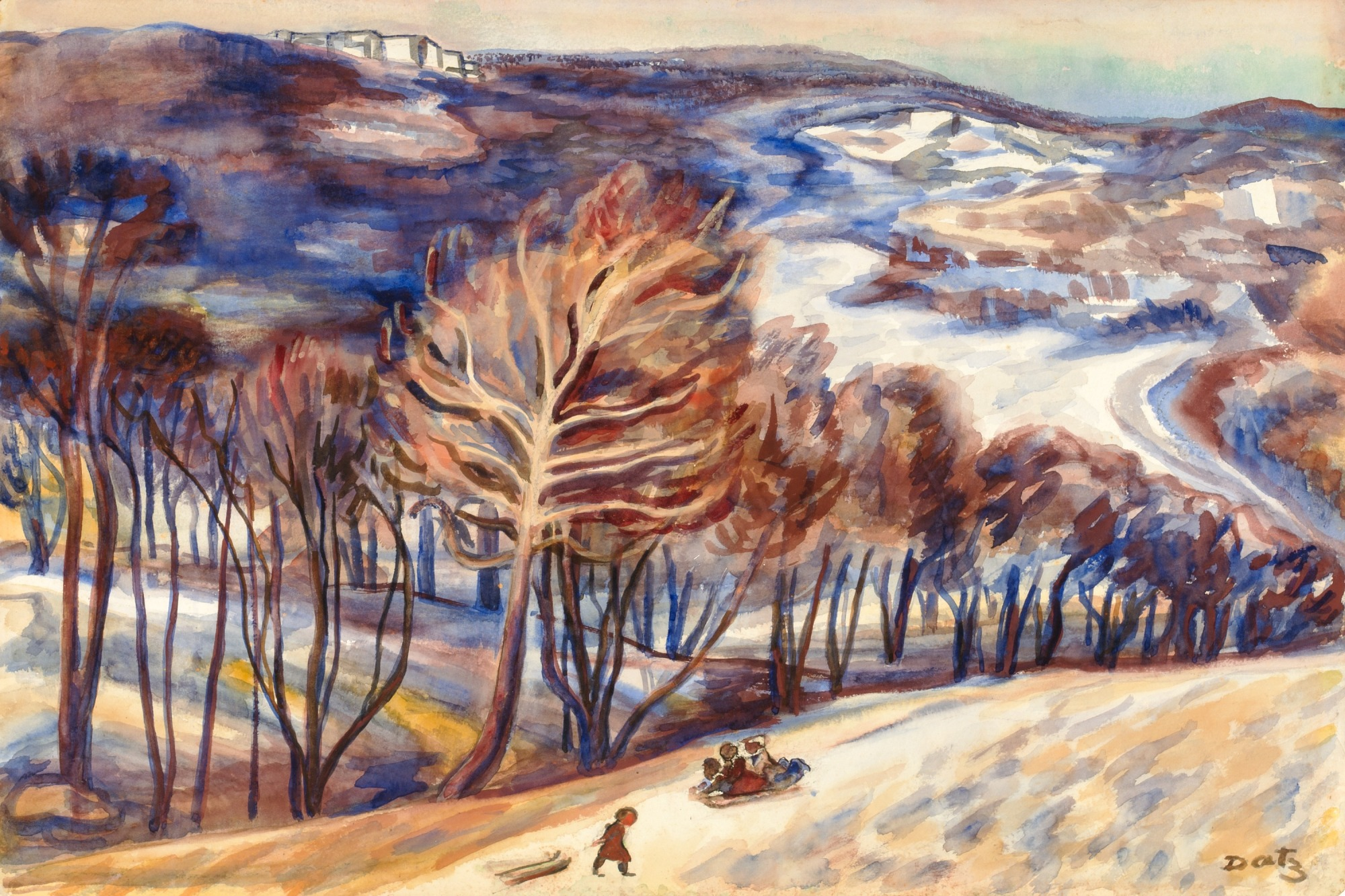
Happy Days (1940) - Smithsonian American Art Museum.
