= Leah Balsham =

American artist (1915–2015)

- Born: September 28, 1915; Philadelphia, Pennsylvania, U.S.
- Died: 2015 (aged 99–100); Beverly Shores, Indiana, U.S.
- Known for: Lithography

Leah Balsham (September 28, 1915 – December 2 2015) was an American lithographer and ceramic artist. Balsham took part in the Federal Works Progress Administration. Balsham attended the University of Chicago and the Archie Bray Foundation for the Ceramic Arts. She also traveled to Japan to study. Balsham died in 2015 in Beverly Shores, Indiana.

== Collections ==
- Art Institute of Chicago
- Metropolitan Museum of Art
- Mills College Art Museum
- Museum of Modern Art, New York
- Newark Museum
- Smithsonian American Art Museum
