= Arnold Wiltz =

American painter

- Born: June 18, 1889; Berlin, Germany
- Died: March 13, 1937 (aged 47); Kingston, New York, United States
- Occupation: Painter

Arnold Wiltz (June 18, 1889 – March 13, 1937) was an American painter. His work was part of the painting event in the art competition at the 1932 Summer Olympics.

== Gallery ==
Reprezentative works as a precisionist

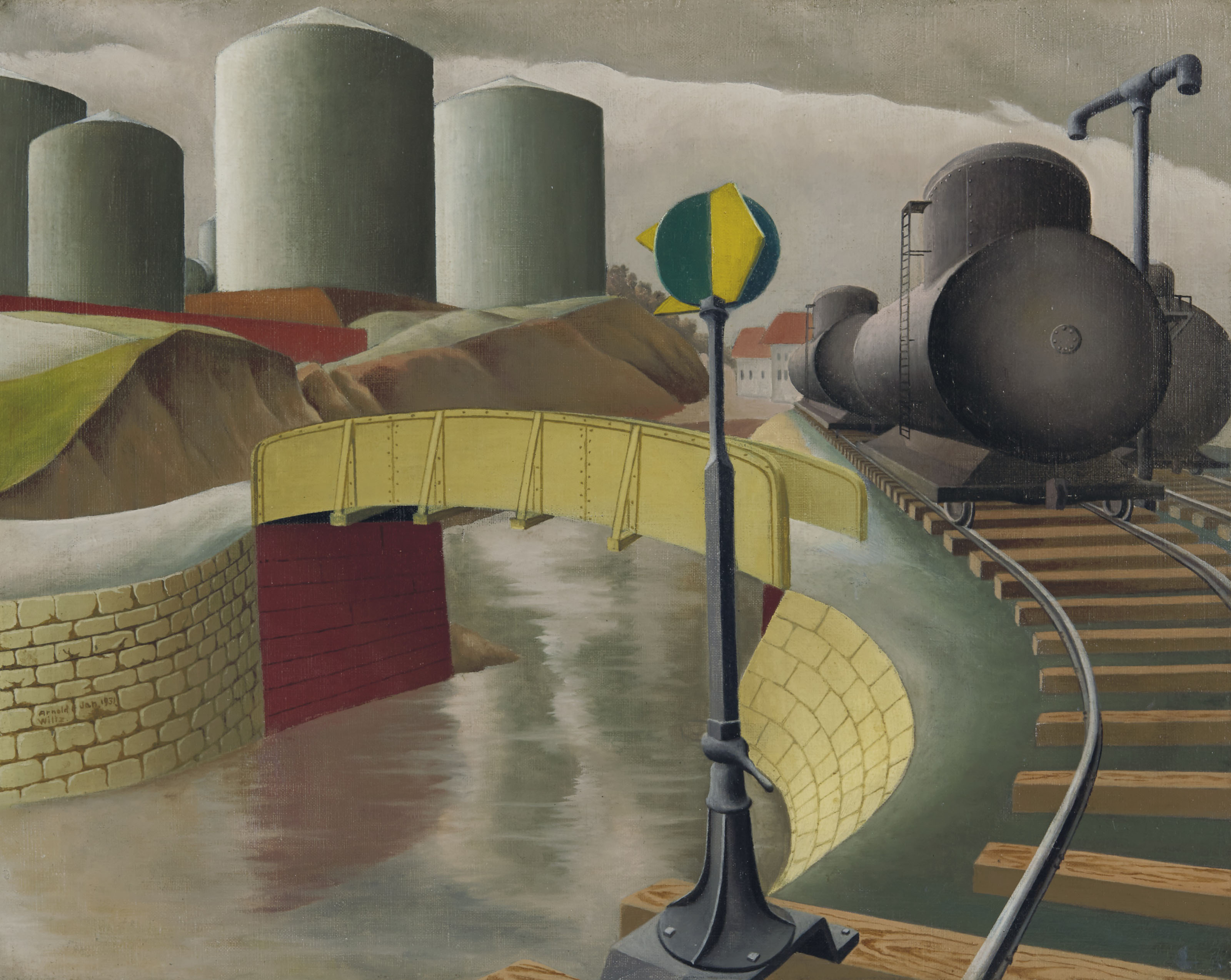
1931 – Arnold Wiltz – American Landscape No. 3

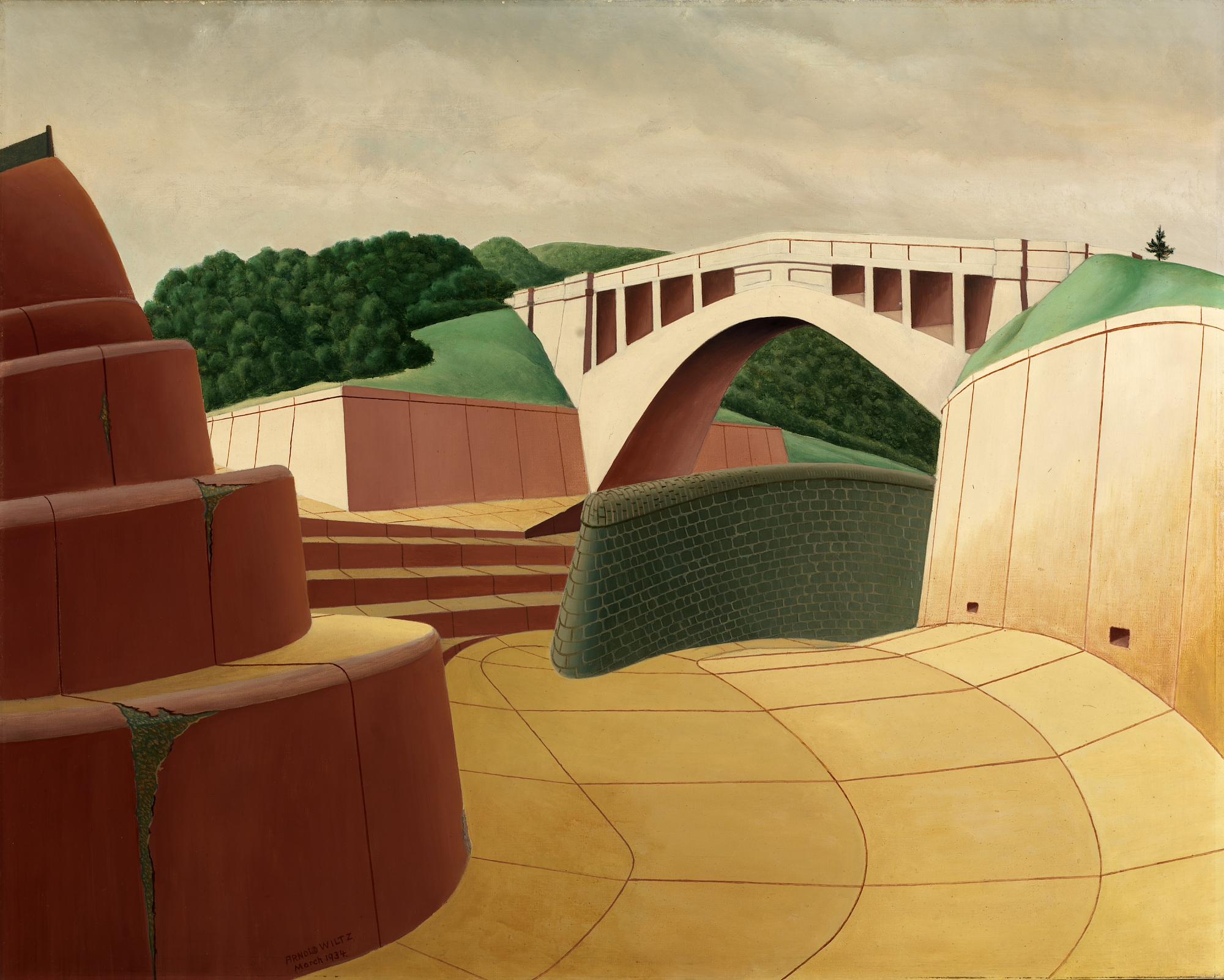
1934 – Arnold Wiltz – Spillway, Ashokan Dam
