= Marguerite Redman Dorgeloh =

American printmaker (1890–1944)

- Born: December 14, 1890; Watsonville, California
- Died: March 18, 1944 (aged 53); Los Angeles County, California
- Education: California School of Fine Arts, State Teachers College at San Jose
- Known for: WPA lithographs

Marguerite Redman Dorgeloh (1890–1944) was an American printmaker. She took part in the Works Progress Administration's Federal Art Project.

Born on December 14, 1890, in Watsonville, California, Dorgeloh studied at the California School of Fine Arts and the State Teachers College at San Jose. She went on to work for the San Francisco Fine Arts Project of the Works Progress Administration (WPA).

Dorgeloh died by suicide on March 18, 1944, in Pasadena, California.

== Collections ==
- Smithsonian American Art Museum
- Metropolitan Museum of Art
- Smart Museum of Art, Chicago
- Fine Arts Museums of San Francisco
- National Gallery of Art, Washington
- Newark Museum of Art
- Philadelphia Museum of Art
- Ackland Art Museum
- Baltimore Museum of Art
- University of Arizona Museum of Art

== Gallery ==
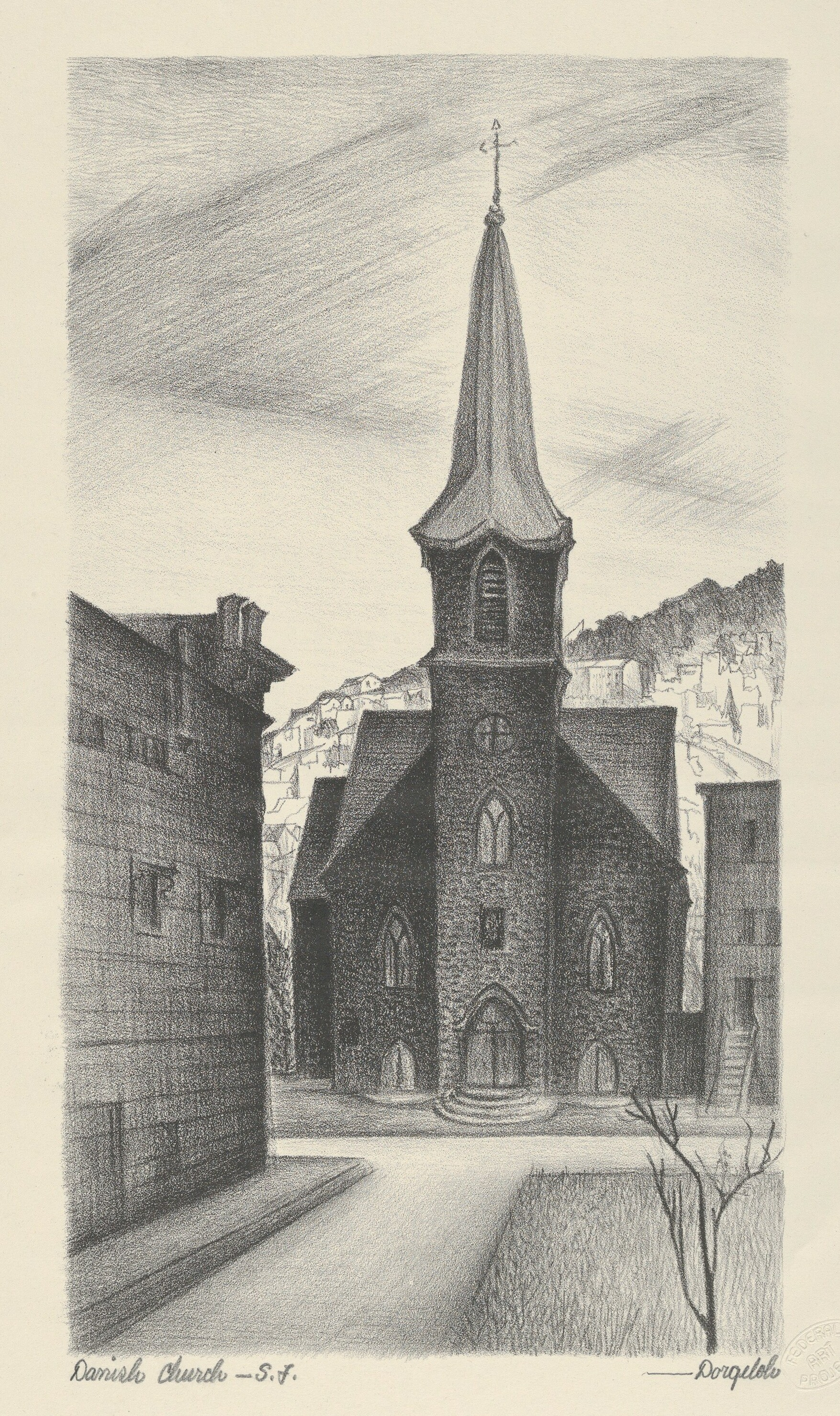
Danish Church, San Francisco, ca. 1935–43

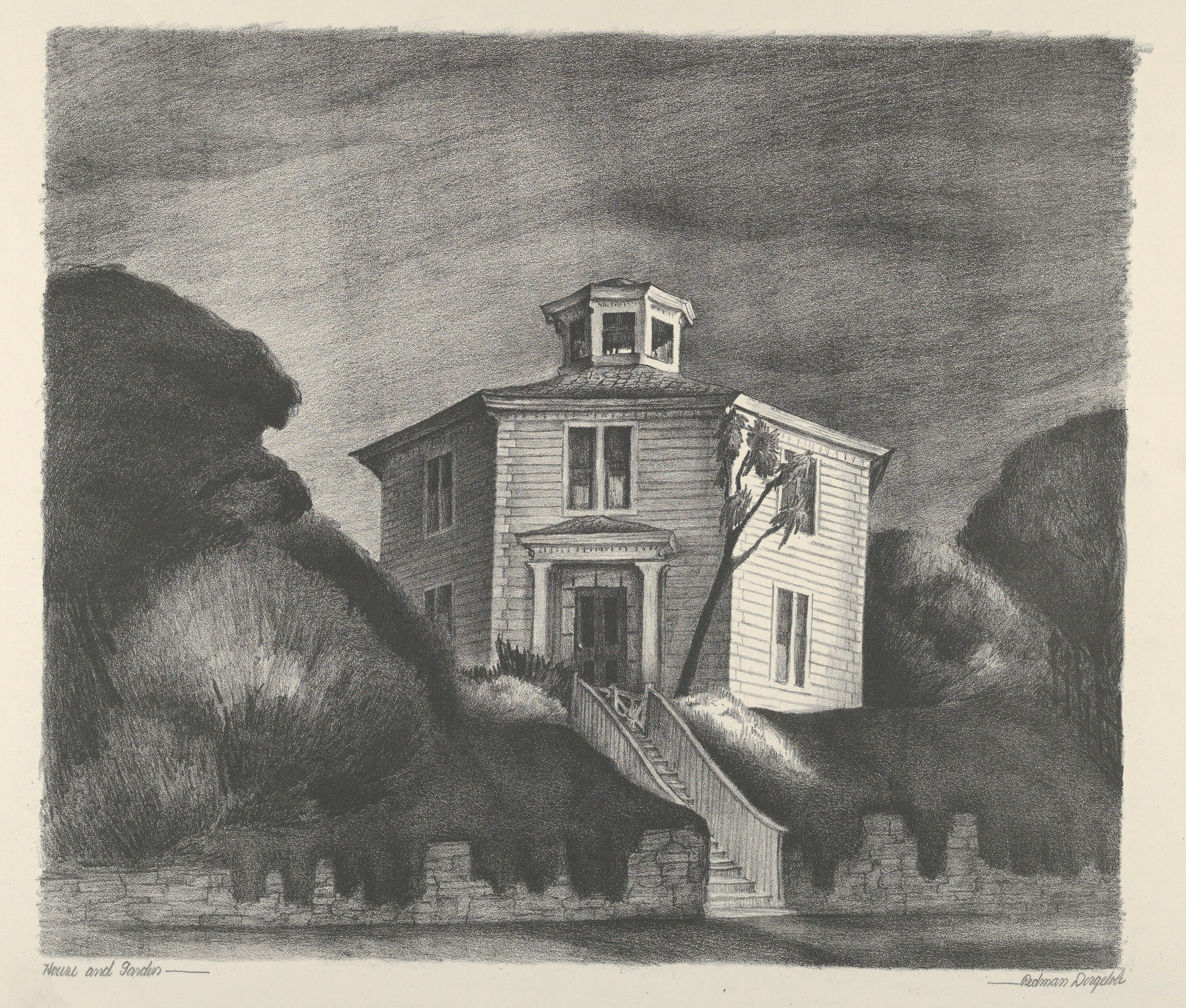
House and Garden, ca. 1935–43

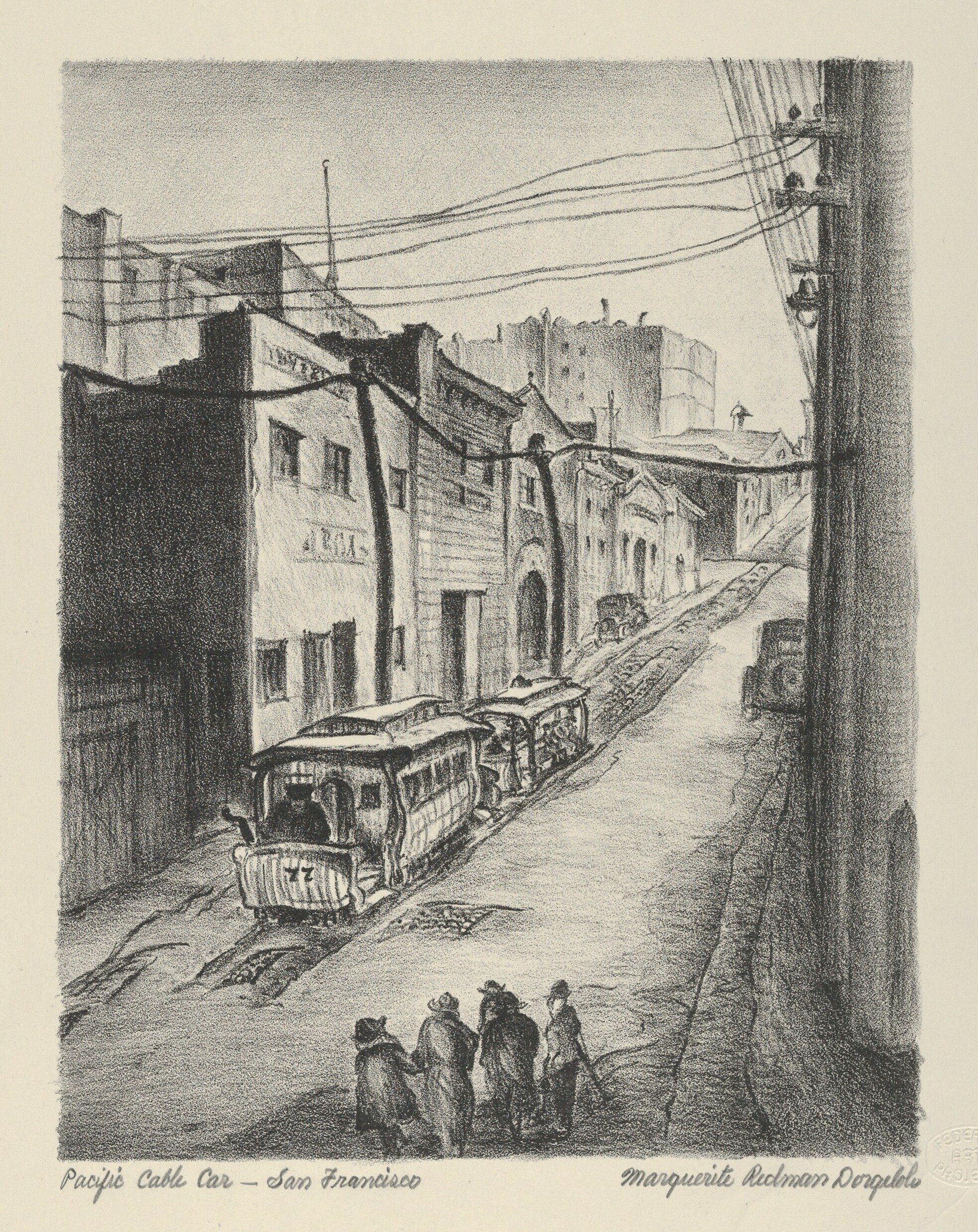
Pacific Cable Car, San Francisco, ca. 1935–43

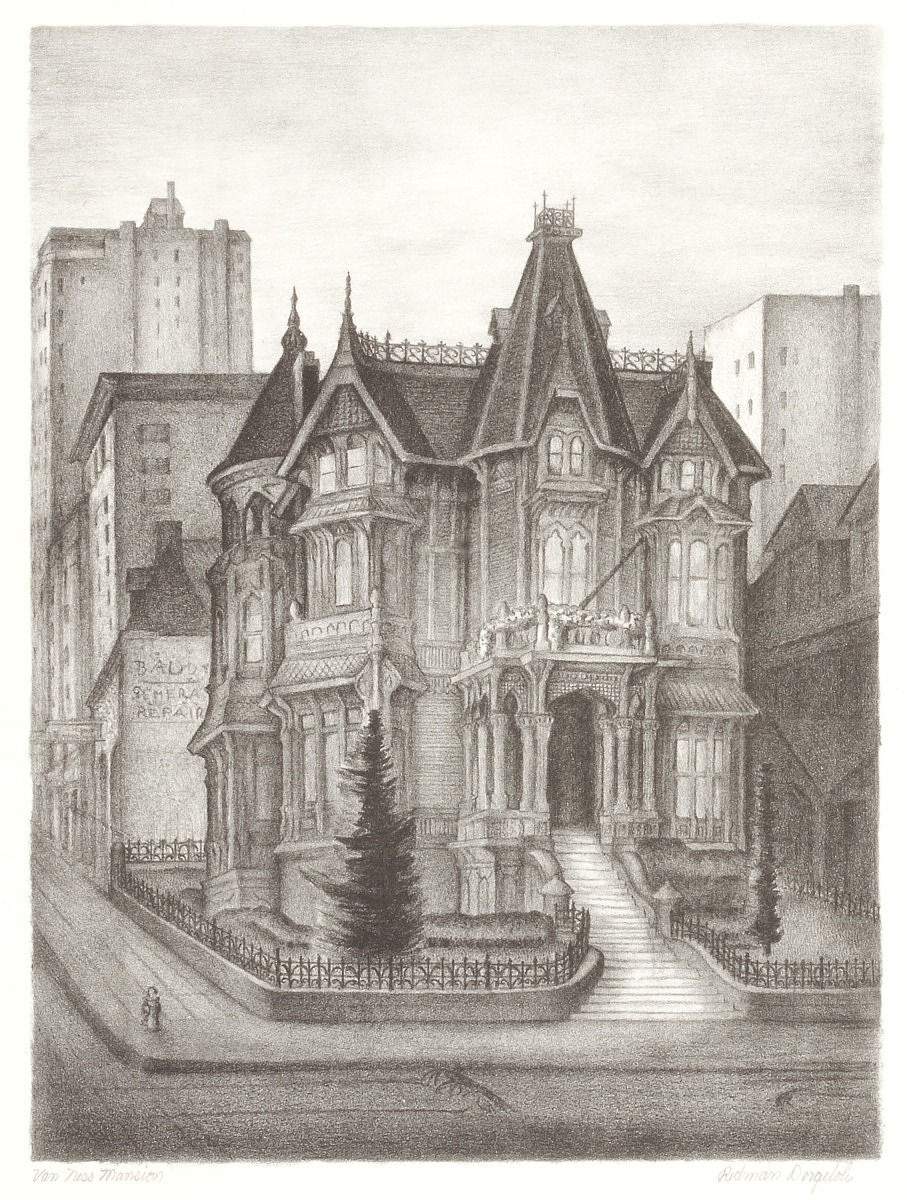
Van Ness Mansion, n.d., lithograph, Smithsonian American Art Museum
