= Hyman William Katz =

American artist

- Born: 1898
- Died: 1988 (aged 89–90)
- Known for: Painter, printmaker

Hyman William Katz (1898–1988) was an American artist (born in Poland) known for his printmaking for the Works Progress Administration (WPA).

Katz's work is in the collection of the Metropolitan Museum of Art, the National Gallery of Art, the Philadelphia Museum of Art, and the Smithsonian American Art Museum.

== Gallery ==
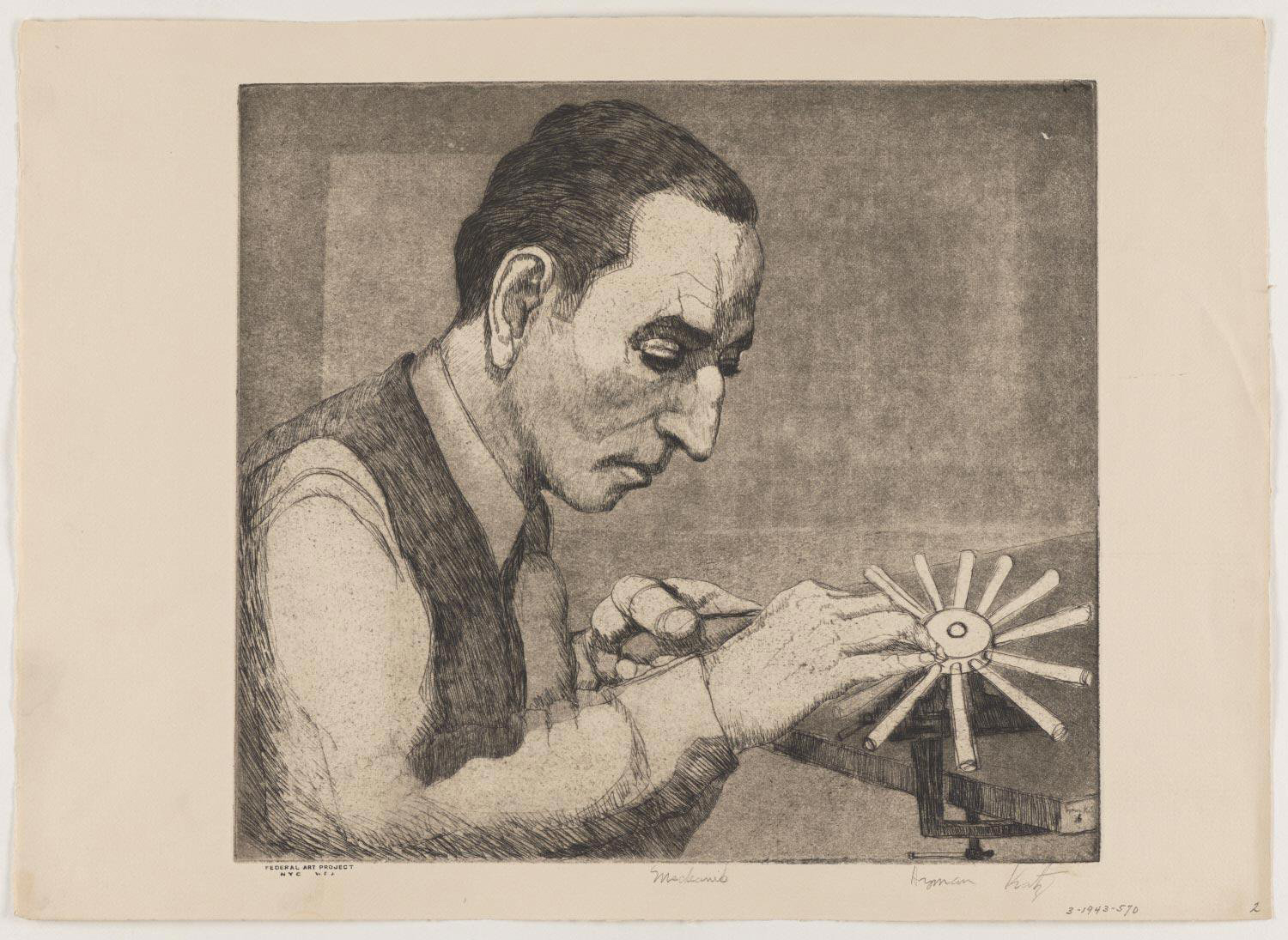
Mechanic, 1936

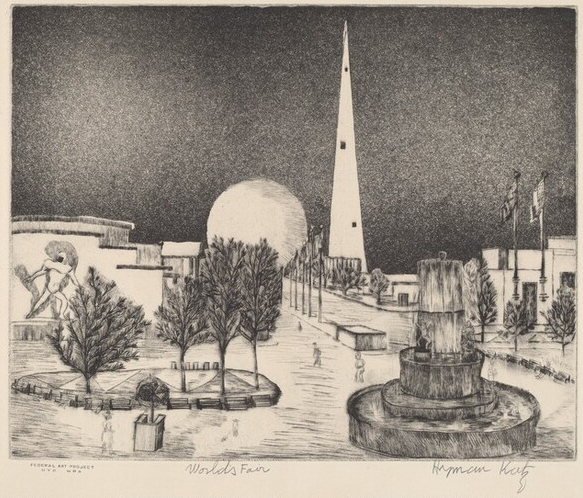
World's Fair, 1939

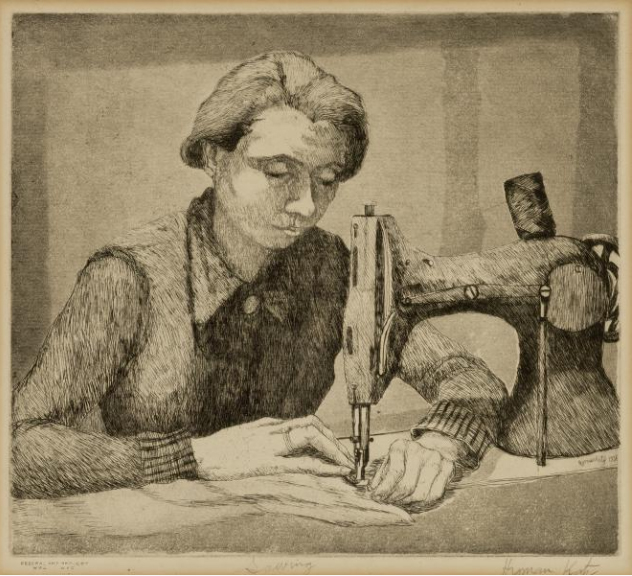
Sewing, n.d
