= Alexander Dux =

Hungarian graphic artist (1898 - 1971)

- Born: April 1, 1898; Austria-Hungary
- Died: December 1971 (aged 73); White Plains, New York
- Notable work: See America poster
- Spouse: Elizabeth Maram
- Parents: Henry Dux (father); Fanny Dux (mother)

Alexander "Sandor" Dux (April 1, 1898 - 1971) was a Hungarian American figurative and landscape painter and commercial artist known for his Works Progress Administration travel posters.

== Early life and education ==
Dux was born in 1898 to Frances "Fanny" and Henry Dux in Austria-Hungary. He came to America with his three siblings for better opportunities in June 1910 via the S.S. Carpathia. He worked as a library clerk. He became a naturalized citizen in 1925. He exhibited a set of his paintings at New York Public Library's 58th Street Branch in 1926.

== Career ==
Dux's See America poster

Dux studied at the National Academy of Design in New York City. In 1921 he received an honorable mention in their annual Chaloner Prize competition. He joined the recently formed Society of Independent Artists and participated in their 1925 annual exhibition.

Dux worked for the census in the early 1930s, making $12/hr working three days per week. Dux was associated with the Federal Art Project and oversaw the design of several pieces produced under the project. These included the 1936 design for the 1937 "See America" travel poster depicting the Carlsbad Caverns, which was created for the United States Travel Bureau. He participated in exhibitions at the National Academy of Design c. 1920-1924, and The Society of Independent Artists in 1925. In one of his later exhibitions in 1942, his painting was said to have "the sense of locale of a Willard Metcalf but the dry brownish tonality of a J. Francis Murphy."

Dux also participated in the creation of the official Works Progress Administration Federal Arts Project 1939 calendar. In the 1950s he was working as a commercial artist.

== Personal life ==
Dux married Elizabeth Maram in 1936. She worked as a teacher. They had two sons, Albert and Francis. They lived in the Bronx and then moved to Shrub Oak section of Yorktown, New York. He died in 1973. His widow, Elizabeth, committed suicide in 1973.

== Legacy ==
Dux's poster design for the Carlsbad Caverns is widely reproduced today and has been featured or discussed in numerous publications over the years. His works are held by the Library of Congress, US National Archives and the Philadelphia Museum of Art as well as many private collections throughout the United States.
