= Laicita Gregg =

American artist

- Born: Laicita Warburton Worden; September 25, 1892; Philadelphia, Pennsylvania
- Died: August 26, 1975 (aged 82); Rutland, Vermont
- Known for: Painting

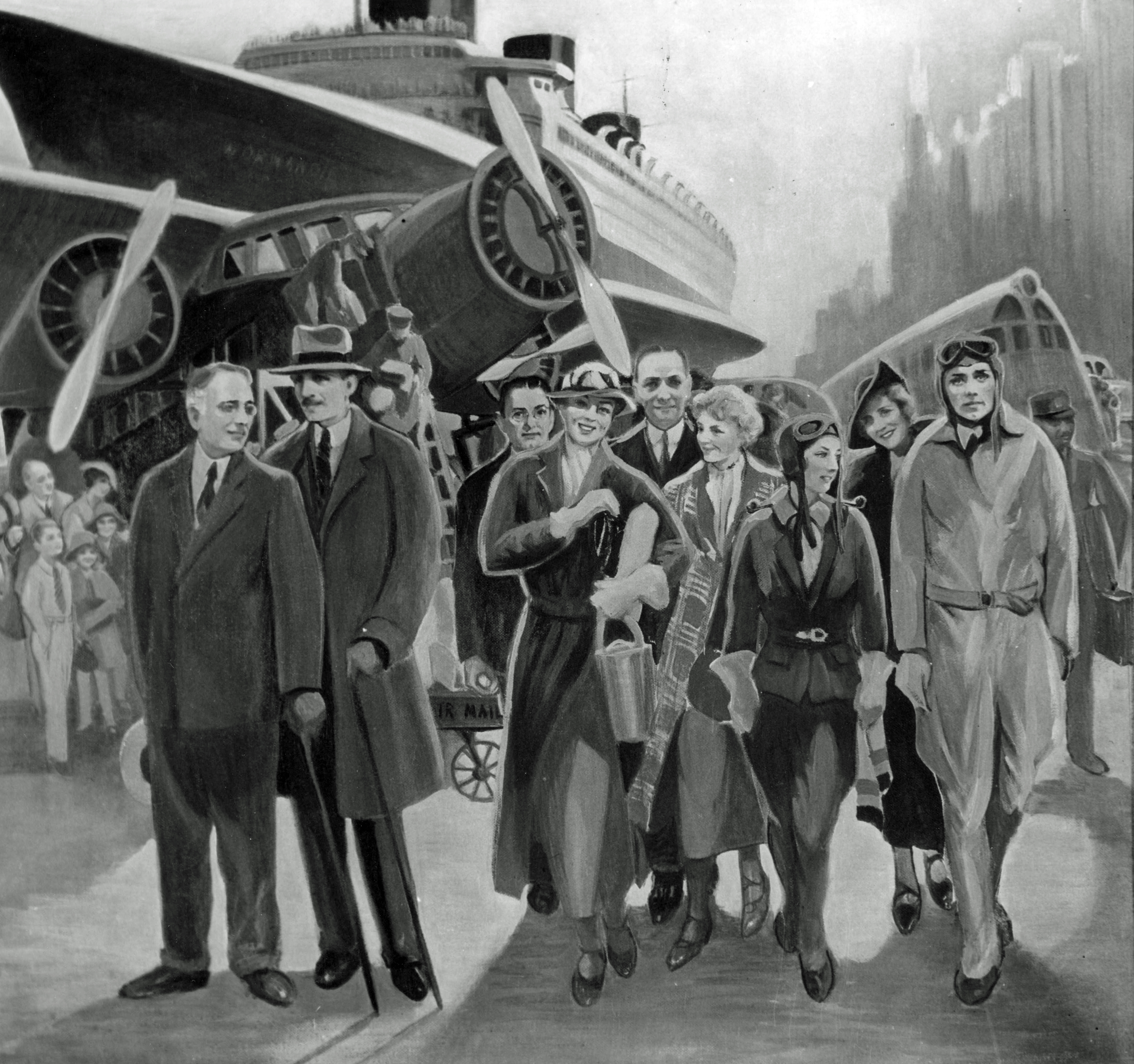
History of Transportation, ca. 1935-1943

Laicita Worden Gregg (1892–1975) was an American artist who created murals for the Works Progress Administration (WPA).

Gregg née Worden was born in Philadelphia, Pennsylvania on September 25, 1892. She attended the Pennsylvania Academy of Fine Arts. In 1919 she married Kenneth Philbrick Gregg. She painted murals for the WPA that were installed in locations in Connecticut; the New Canaan High School, the New Canaan Library, the Stamford Court House, and public schools in Weston, Connecticut and Wilton, Connecticut. She also painted a three panel mural of The Regicides for a school in New Haven, Connecticut. That mural was restored by the New Haven Museum and Historical Society. Gregg died in Rutland, Vermont on August 26, 1975.
