= John Matulis =

American artist (1910–2000)

John George Matulis
- Born: 1910
- Died: January 10, 2000 (aged 89–90)

John Matulis, Parian Pitcher, c. 1937, watercolor, , Index of American Design, National Gallery of Art, Washington, DC.

John George Matulis ( 1910 - January 10, 2000) was an American artist.

Matulis created illustrations for the Index of American Design. These illustrations are part of the collection in the National Gallery of Art. Matulis served in the U. S. Army during World War II, creating maps. After the war, Matulis had a career as an illustrator for the Pratt & Whitney aerospace company.
