= Marie Bleck =

American artist

- Born: 1911
- Died: 1949 (aged 37–38)
- Known for: printmaker

Marie Bleck (1911–1949) was an American printmaker known for her work with the Works Progress Administration (WPA). She attended Oshkosh State Teachers College and Milwaukee State Teachers College. She went on to teach art in the Wisconsin public school system, becoming head of the art department of Oshkosh High School in 1938. In the late 1930s and early 1940s Bleck created prints for the Federal Art Project of the WPA. During World War II Bleck served in the WAVES (Women Accepted for Volunteer Emergency Service). After her service she settled in Alaska, where she taught art in Palmer. Bleck died in 1949 at the age of 37.

Bleck's work is in the Metropolitan Museum of Art. Her work was included in the 2017 exhibition entitled WPA Art from RAM'S Collection at the Racine Art Museum.

== Gallery ==
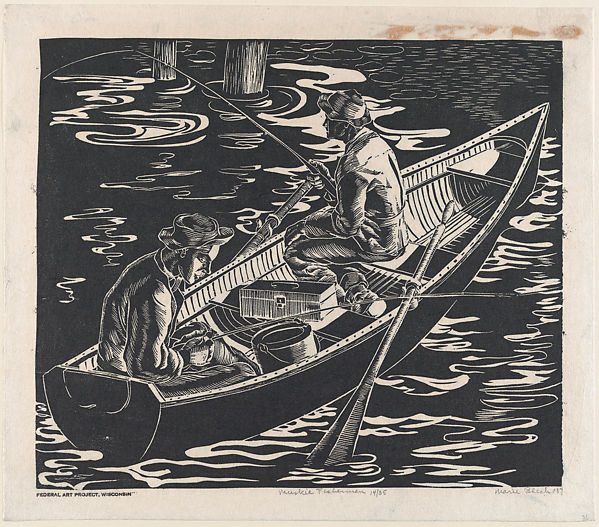
Muskie Fishermen, 1937

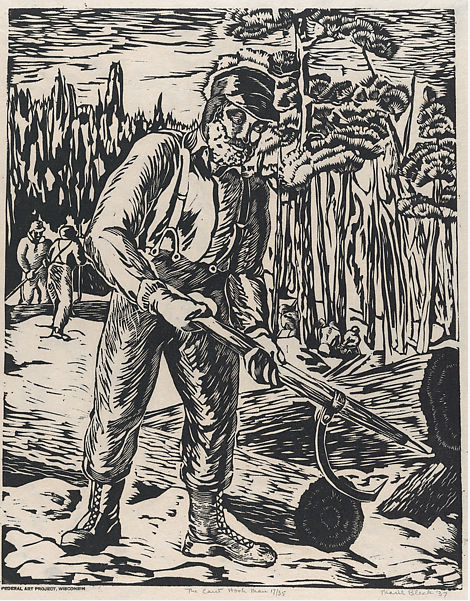
The Cant Hookman 1937

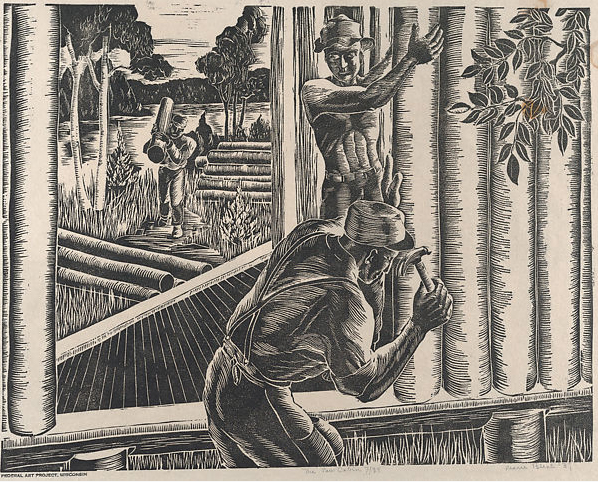
The New Cabin, 1937
