= Mabel Wellington Jack =

American printmaker

- Born: 1899; New York, New York
- Died: 1975 (aged 75–76); Gowanda, New York

Mabel Wellington Jack (1899–1975) was an American printmaker. Many of her prints were published by the New York City Federal Art Project (WPA/FAP). Her work is included in the collections of the Baltimore Museum of Art, the Smithsonian American Art Museum, the Metropolitan Museum of Art, the National Gallery of Art, Washington, the Franklin D. Roosevelt Presidential Library and Museum, and the Princeton University Art Museum.

== Gallery ==
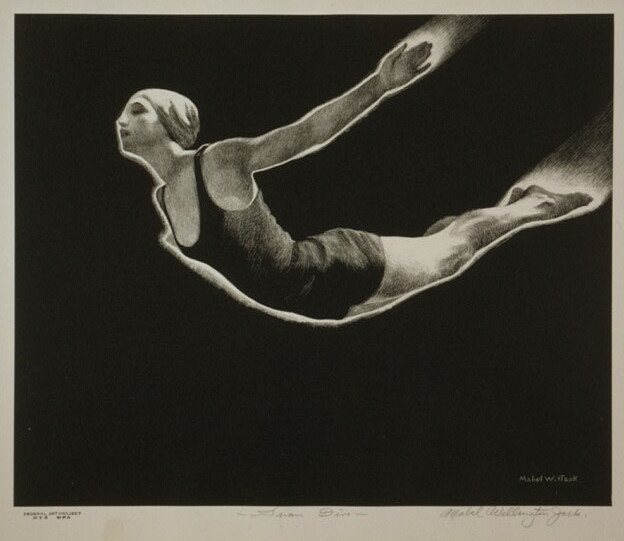
Swan Dive, 1939

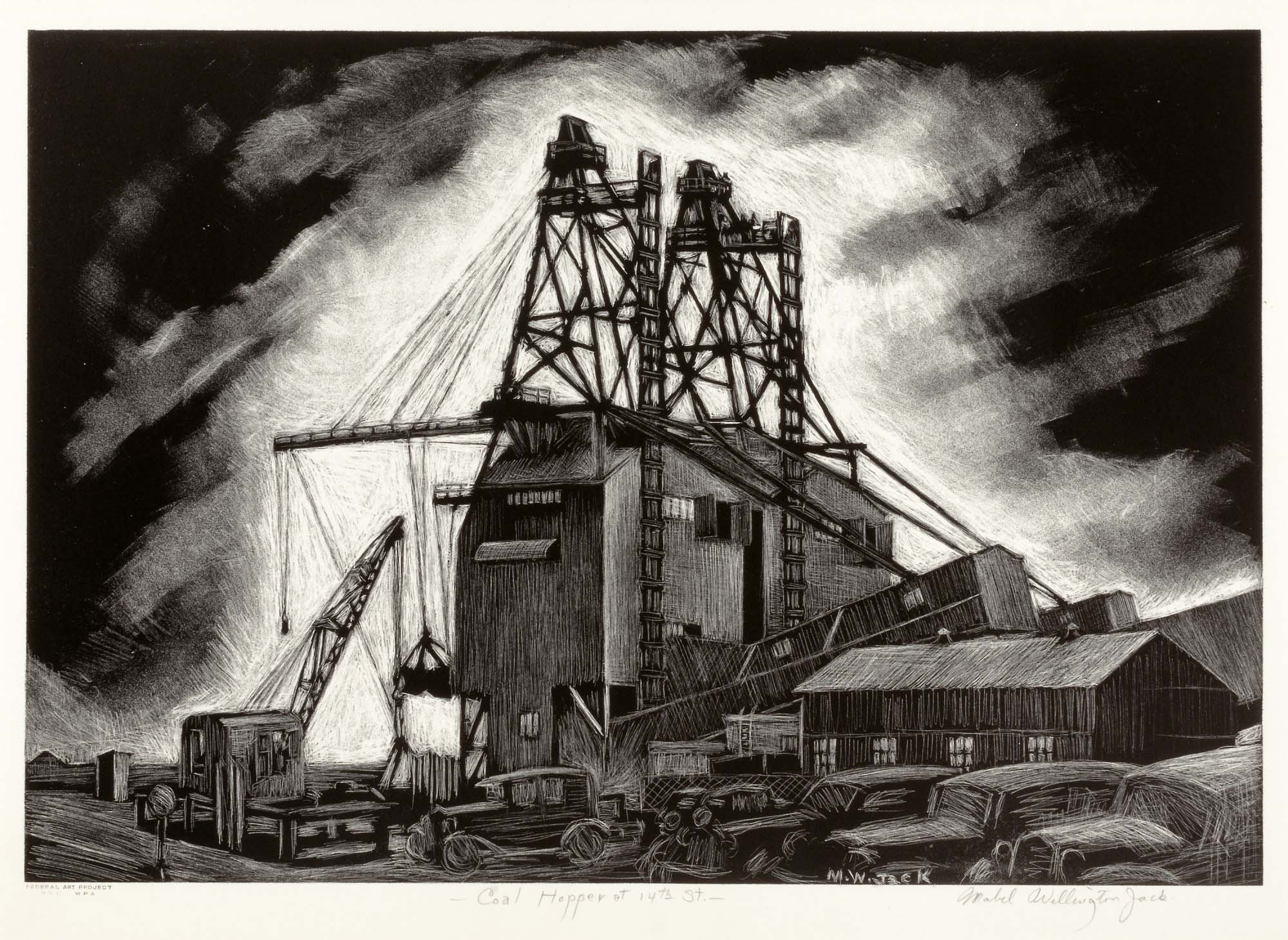
Coal Hopper at 14th Street

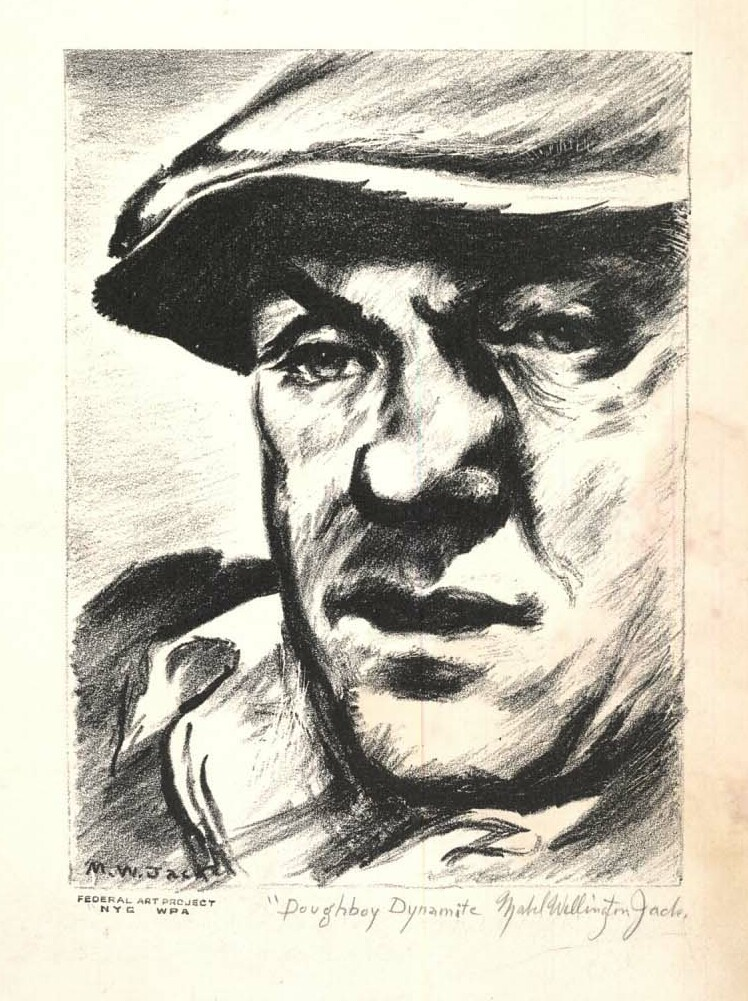
Doughboy Dynamite, 1938
