= Frank K. Ominsky =

American artist (1898–1981)

- Born: 1898; New York, New York
- Died: 1981 (aged 82–83); New Haven, Connecticut

Frank K. Ominsky - Bradshaw’s Twist

Frank K. Ominsky (1898, New York City-1981 New Haven, Connecticut) was an American artist. He is know for his printmaking for the Works Progress Administration. His prints are in the collection of the Smithsonian American Art Museum, the National Gallery of Art, and the Art Institute of Chicago.
