= Ishigaki =

Ishigaki may refer to:

- Ishigaki Island, a Japanese island southwest of Okinawa
  - Ishigaki, Okinawa, city
  - Ishigaki Airport (1943)
- Japanese escort Ishigaki, World War II era ship of the Japanese Navy
- 10179 Ishigaki, main-belt asteroid

== People with the surname ==
- Ai Ishigaki (born 1970), Japanese guitarist
- Ayako Ishigaki (石垣 綾子; 1903–1996), Japanese-born American journalist
- Eitaro Ishigaki (1893–1958), Japanese-born American artist
- Hirofumi Ishigaki (born 1963), Japanese actor
- Hitoshi Ishigaki (born 1953), Japanese boxer
- Kuraji Ishigaki (1880–1942), Japanese politician
- Mao Ishigaki (石垣 真央; born 1991), Japanese curler
- Ishigaki Rin (1920–2004), Japanese poet
- Ryuya Ishigaki, Japanese curler
- Yuka Ishigaki (石垣 優香; born 1989), Japanese table tennis player
- Yuma Ishigaki (born 1982), Japanese actor

== See also ==
- Iriomote-Ishigaki National Park, a park near the island above
