= Claire Mahl Moore =

American artist

- Born: 1917
- Died: 1988 (aged 70–71)
- Other names: Clara Mahl, Claire Moore, Claire Millman
- Education: Art Students League
- Movement: Siqueiros Experimental Workshop

Claire Mahl Moore (1917–1988) was an American artist known for her printmaking. Her career spanned from the 1930s through the 1980s. Moore took classes at the Art Students League, under the instructors Charles Locke, Harry Wickey, and Thomas Hart Benton. During the Great Depression, she worked as a printmaker for the Federal Art Project under the New Deal.

She was a member of the "initial nucleus" of The Siqueiros Experimental Workshop in New York, 1936. The Workshop was organized by the Mexican artist, David Alfaro Siqueiros who was then visiting New York as a Mexican delegate to the American Artists' Congress. Other artists in this "initial nucleus" include Harold Lehman, Sande McCoy, Jackson Pollock, Axel Horn, George Cox, Lou Ferstadt, Luis Arenal, Antonio Pujol, Conrado Vasquez, Jose Guatierrez, and Roberto Berdecio. The Workshop was "ready to raise the standard of a true revolutionary art program, and its two main goals were firstly, to be a base for exploration of "modern art techniques", and secondly, to "create art for the people." The workshop was organized along collective principles, with artists meeting and collaborating on works.

Mahl's work has been exhibited at the Brooklyn Museum, the Museum of Modern Art, the Hudson Walker Gallery, and the Julien Levy Gallery. Her work is in the collections of the British Museum, the Museum of Modern Art, the National Gallery of Art, the New York Public Library, and the Smithsonian American Art Museum,

== Gallery ==
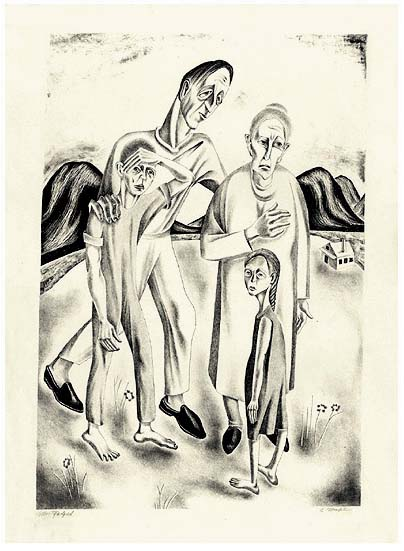
Mortgaged, c. 1936-39

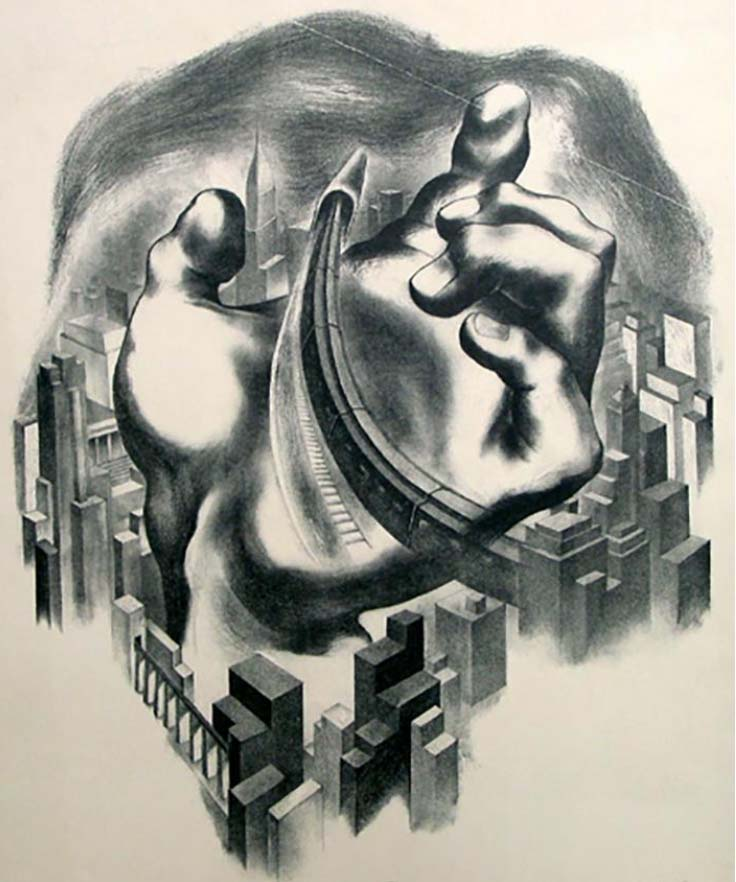
Transportation, ca. 1935–43

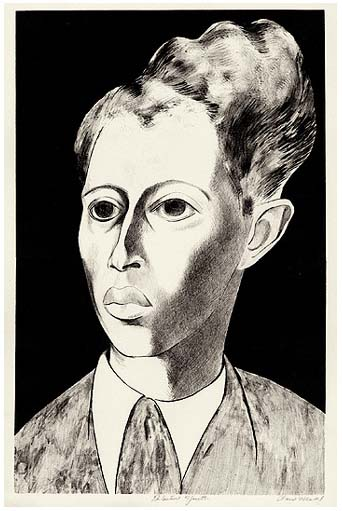
Palestine Youth, 1937
