= Winifred Milius Lubell =

American illustrator and writer

- Union members rally for awareness. From left to right: Edward "Deyo" Jacobs, Winifred Milius, and Hugh Miller. Photograph by Irving Marantz. From the Archives of American Art
- Born: June 14, 1914; New York City, United States
- Died: January 3, 2012 (aged 97); Provincetown, Massachusetts
- Education: Art Students League of New York; Duncan Phillips Museum School
- Known for: Illustrator writer

Winifred Milius Lubell (June 14, 1914 – January 3, 2012) was an American illustrator, artist and writer. In her early adult years, Milius was active in the Communist Party of the United States and an advocate for social justice. She began her artistic career creating pen and ink portraits of victims of the Great Depression, before proceeding to examine the struggles of the working poor in the towns of the Eastern United States through woodcuts, as well as producing drawings from the sit down strikes in Chicago. An artist and an illustrator, Milius' most notable publications include the illustrations for Dorothy Sterling's Cape Cod natural history book The Outer Lands. In her eighties she wrote and illustrated the women's studies exploration of feminism, sexuality and mythology: The Metamorphosis of Baubo, Myths of Woman's Sexual Energy. She died on January 3, 2012, of congestive heart failure. She was 97.

== Early life ==
Winifred Milius Lubell was born in New York City to Elsa Simonson and Lester Milius. Wealthy New Yorkers, the Milius' ancestors immigrated to the United States from Bavaria in the 19th century and made fortunes in Manhattan real estate and textiles. Raised in a German-Jewish family in New York, her parents were conscious of their social status, looking down upon those below them in the social ladder, even as they were set off for their Jewish heritage. Her mother was more liberal than her father and was the younger sister of the noted theatre designer and critic Lee Simonson. This upbringing led to Elsa Simonson socializing with modernist artists such as Charles Demuth, Marsden Hartley, Florine Stettheimer, and William and Marguerite Zorach. From 1922 to 1932, Milius attended the Ethical Culture Fieldston School, which contradicted the views of her father by teaching racial equality, social justice and intellectual freedom. Her teachings at Fieldston led her to be called a "rebel" as a youth, protesting the double standards of the upper class.

== Artistic career ==
=== Early days ===
Elsa Simonson was an amateur painter, working out of a large art studio on Riverside Drive at which Winifred began her artistic explorations. In April 1923, Simonson had a solo exhibition as a member of the art co-operative Artists Galleries. That year she also joined the Salons of America, which was formed by Hamilton Easter Field, and others who had left the Society of Independent Artists. She painted floral still lifes, nudes and rural landscapes, exhibiting her work through the 1920s until 1928, when Parkinson's disease caused her to stop painting.

Elsa Simonson died in 1933, which led Milius to become more serious about her artistic career. In October 1933 she enrolled in the National Academy of Design to learn figure drawing. Eventually she became frustrated by the strict and conservative nature of the academy. After an instructor told her to concentrate on plaster casts to bring "classic dignity" to her life drawings, she quit school and declared she was going to move out of New York. Instead of leaving, she took classes at the Art Students League of New York, where students could choose their own classes without strict guidelines. In 1934 she began taking a life drawing class under artist George Grosz. An opportunity to study under Grosz appealed to her due to his leftist ideologies and technical innovations. Despite disappointment in Grosz's political weariness, Milius found influence in Grosz's class trips to the Hooverville shantytowns, where Milius and her classmates documented the plight of the homeless during the Great Depression. The victims and impoverished that she observed would find their way into sketches, which eventually developed into prints.

Disappointed with Grosz's lack of political energy, Milius began training under printmaker Harry Sternberg, who she described as a "spirited leftist". Sternberg was a member of the John Reed Club, and his Marxist beliefs began to influence Milius and her fellow students including Rita Albers, Julien Alberts, Mary Annand, Hugh Miller. Encouraged by Sternberg, the students joined the Artists Union in New York. Milius exhibited her art in union shows, and was one of hundreds who participated in the Rockefeller vandalism protests, which protested the destruction of Diego Rivera's Man at the Crossroads painting. With her political and artistic friends, she frequently visited the New York Public Library print collections, the Metropolitan Museum of Art, and New York art galleries.

Milius and fellow student Blanche Grambs explored various New York neighborhoods such as the Lower East Side, the waterfront, and SoHo, drawing outside, or going inside to the New York Public Library on cold days. Milius's works of the NYPL depict the buildings use as a shelter for Depression-era victims, reflective of the use of libraries today as an afternoon housing for the poor. In 1935 Milius and Grambs started using the studio of William Karp, creating formal portraits. The two used unemployed men as models, who they would find at Stuyvesant Square; models that would allow the two emerging artists to continue to explore social awareness within their art. Milius' portraits and sketches of this time expressed the failure of Capitalism and the resilience of the working class.

After working at Karp's studio for a summer, the two joined an information sketch group that met at Will Barnet's tenement apartment. Milius would make portraits of the children in the neighborhood, and produced a pen-and-ink drawing that would be her first published piece in Marxist publication The New Masses.

=== Industrial themes ===
Coal Gatherers, woodcut, 1937.

Milius moved away from urban themes after two years, and in 1936 began introducing industrial themes into her work. That year, Harry Sternberg received a Guggenheim Fellowship to travel to mining and steelmaking centers in the United States, and he brought a group of students with him, including Milius, who visited an anthracite mining town in Lanford, Pennsylvania. The whereabouts of the works that Milius created from this trip are unknown, but, several journals depict studies of Lanford miners preparing for work. Milius stayed with a host-family in Lanford, and was moved by the malnutrition suffered by the family, describing how after dinner, the miner, his wife, and his family "crossed to a single sideboard, each in turn taking out their false teeth, which they placed in glasses of water lined in a row, and went straight to bed."

Her woodcut, Coal Gatherers, expresses her concerns with the poverty in mining towns, which shows children collecting coal bits from train tracks to bring back to their families for fuel. This piece, designed to bring public awareness to the plight of miners, was included in the American Artists' Congress "America Today" exhibition, which opened in thirty cities in December 1936. The exhibition was designed to show awareness to social concerns and promote the ability to mass-produce prints in fast and inexpensive manners for wide distribution.

=== Move to Chicago ===
At the end of 1936, Milius moved to Chicago with her first husband, Daniel House, whom she married in 1935. House began law school at the University of Chicago and Milius settled into activities with the Chicago branch of the Artists Union. She befriended Mitchell Siporin, Morris Topchevsky, and Adrian Troy, joining them in their ongoing dispute against the Illinois Art Project (IAP). IAP became a target after issues with dismissals, subject matter censoring, and the rights of the artists to organize. On December 12, 1936, 27 representatives from the Illinois Workers Alliance, the Technical and Research Employees Union, the Adult Teachers' Union and the Artists Union, occupied the IAP headquarters in a sitdown strike. Milius participated in the eight-day sitdown, and her drawings of the event were published in the Chicago Daily News and New Masses.

In the spring and summer of 1937, artists' strikes and conflicts with authorities became headline news along with the violent industrial struggles. Milius participated more than ever in the labor movement, and assisted Harry Sternberg in creating the painting Epoch of a Great City, when he came to Lakeview, Illinois to complete the mural at a post office. The two visited stockyards and workers districts, gaining inspiration for the piece. Milius also became active in the Packinghouse Workers Organizing Committee, painting banners, creating illustrations for publications and disturbing those leaflets.

Two men with hats, 1937. Winifred Lubell papers, Archives of American Art, Smithsonian Institution.

Milius' activities within the Communist Party put a strain on her relationship with her husband, who was a Trotskyite, opposed to the Communist Party. Within two years the couple had separated and Milius moved back to New York.

=== Back in the East ===
Returning to New York in 1938, Milius began making contributions to the theater scene. She designed costumes for the Dave Doran Memorial Committee modern dance performance, which served as a fundraiser for Communist Party trade union director Dave Doran, who died in combat as the youngest commander in the Abraham Lincoln Brigade. She also designed costumes for a musical called A Song About America, which depicted the Boston Tea Party, the Steel strike of 1919 and other revolutionary American moments. Despite a few experiments, she would not pursue costume design beyond 1939.

Milius began spending time at the Fifteenth Street studio, which was shared by Mervin Jules and Axel Horn. A social center for artists, intellectuals and revolutionaries, it was there where she met Cecil Lubell, a Harvard graduate and scholar of William Blake and James Joyce who became an expert on textiles and authored several books and an encyclopedia of textiles. The two had much in common, including the belief that the Communists were the only group addressing the serious problems in society at the time. They were married in Boston in 1939 and moved to Croton-on-Hudson, New York. Shortly after their marriage and move, they collaborated on their first book: Petticoat Picket Lines: The History of Women in the American Labor Movement, which Cecil Lubell wrote and Winifred Milius illustrated. The book was never published due to the onset of World War II. Milius continued to explore gender, race, and class through woodcuts based on historical motifs that depicted the lives of black women abolitionists. In 1941 she exhibited in her fifth Artist's Union exhibit, in Massachusetts, displaying her work Marathon Race, which was described as an "amusing bit of abstraction,".

== Post-War ==
Milius and Lubell remained members of the Communist Party of the United States of America until they either were forced to leave (Cecil Lubell) or left of their own accord after the Kruschov speech of 1956 (Winifred), but nonetheless they and their family were affected by the Red Scare Cold War policies. In 1956, Cecil Lubell was subpoenaed by the Internal Security Subcommittee of the U.S. Senate Judiciary Committee chaired by Senator James O. Eastland to testify against friend and neighbor Joseph North. Lubell did not incriminate his friend and neighbor, denying any knowledge of North and his involvement within the Communist Party. During this time, Milius began illustrating more books. She co-created, with Lubell, a series of children's books about animals, natural history, plants and ecosystems.

== Political activity ==
Milius has been active in the Artists Union, the American Artists' Congress and the Communist Party of America. During the Depression era, she participated in activities and events surrounding federal support for the arts, Congress of Industrial Organizations efforts to establish racially integrated labor unions, and the Loyalists opposition in the Spanish Civil War.

Becoming active during her college years, inspired by professor Harry Sternberg. Milius had close artist friends who also joined the ranks of leftist politics, such as Edward Jacobs and Blanche Grambs, whose relationships were solidified with politics and art. She described Communism as an "absolutely wonderful thing," upon discovering it in the early 1930s. While in Chicago, she became active in the organized labor movement, and also contributed to awareness about the Loyalists movement against Francisco Franco in Spain. Block prints by her and other Chicago area artists were included in the book For Spain and Liberty, where Milius expressed "solidarity with all who combat those forces with burned books in Germany, plundered Ethiopia, made shambles of Guernica, and everywhere imperil the minority peoples of the earth."

As of 2005, Milius still believed that poor party leadership led to the failure of Communist ideals. She does not regret her participation in the movement, and says it opened her eyes towards the diversity and complex issues within the world.

In the 1970s, after moving permanently to Wellfleet, Massachusetts, Milius and Lubell founded a Cape Cod chapter of Amnesty International and became active supporters of the Wellfleet Public Library.

== Writing ==
Hathor in the Sacred Fig Tree, white line color woodcut, 1984–85

Beginning in the 1940s, Milius wrote and or illustrated over 50 books. In 1994 she published The Metamorphosis of Baubo, Myths of Woman's Sexual Energy. In her late seventies she learned ancient Greek, and in her eighties she translated Batrachomyomachia.

== Legacy ==
In 1995 a selection of Milius' illustrations and sketches were donated to the Andersen Library at the University of Minnesota. In 2003 Milius donated her papers to the Archives of American Art. Following her death, the remainder of her children's book material was donated to the Kerlan Collection in Minnesota, and her artwork and wood blocks to the Rutgers University Libraries in New Brunswick, New Jersey.

== Family ==
In 1935 Milius married her first husband, Daniel House, a law student at the University of Chicago; the couple would live in Chicago and divorce in 1938. She met and married her second husband, English-born writer and textile expert Cecil Lubell (1912–2000) in 1939. The couple shared interests in mythology, psychology, linguistics, and specifically the history and visual styles of written language. They are survived by two sons: David (born 1942), an archaeologist in Waterloo, Canada, and Stephen (born 1945), a typographer and typographic historian in London, UK, grandchildren Naomi, Michal, Anne, Christopher and Claire, and two great grandchildren Ilai and Libby.
