= James Baldwin House =

House in Manhattan, New York

- James Baldwin Residence
- U.S. National Register of Historic Places
- New York State Register of Historic Places
- New York City Landmark
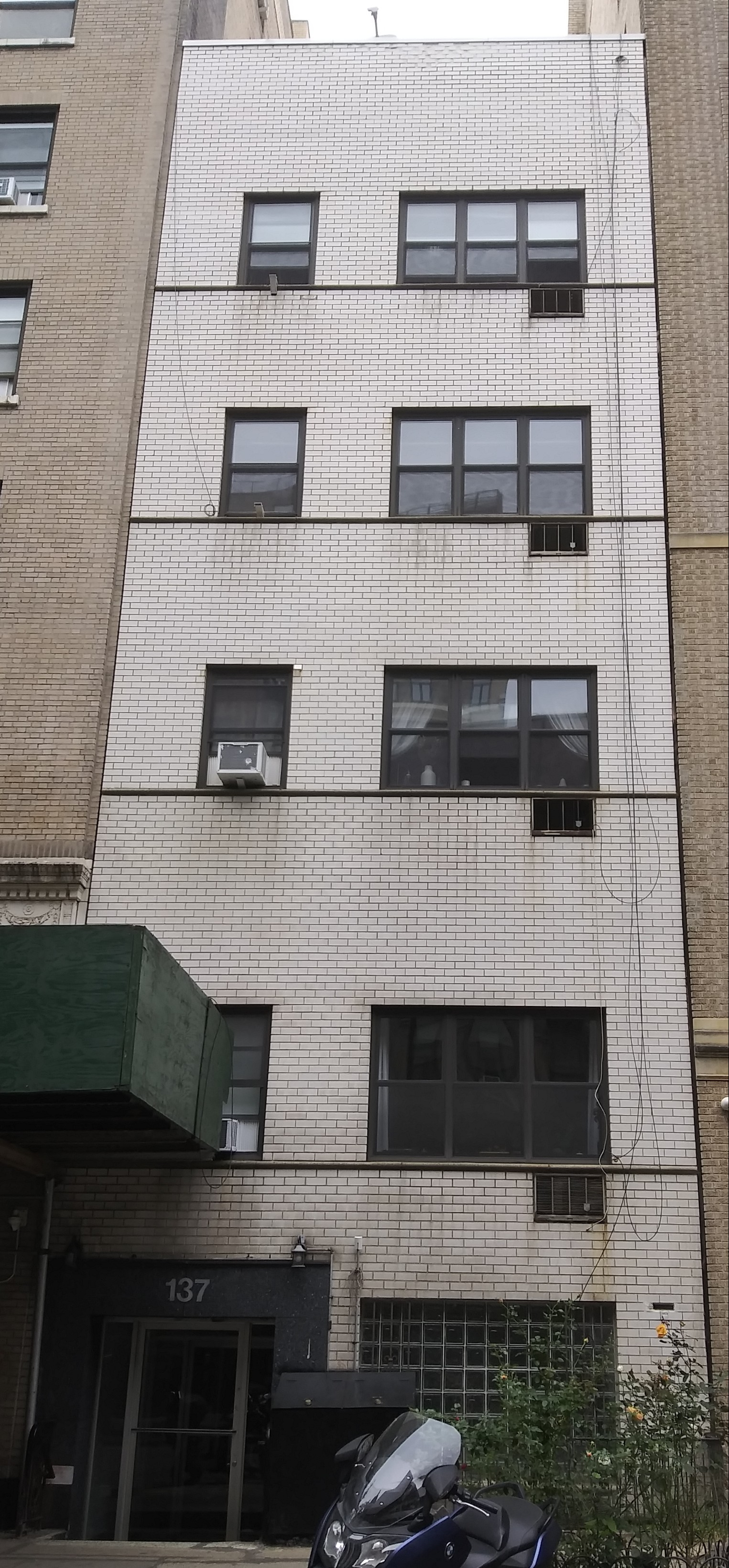

- Location within Manhattan Location within New York City Location within New York Location within the United States
- Location: 137 West 71st Street, Manhattan, New York, US
- Coordinates: 40°46′39″N 73°58′49″W
- Area: 0.05 acres (0.020 ha)
- NRHP reference No.: 100004332
- NYSRHP No.: 06101.009898
- NYCL No.: 2636

Significant dates
- Added to NRHP: 2019-09-03
- Designated NYSRHP: 2019-07-14
- Designated NYCL: 2019-06-03

The James Baldwin House is a rowhouse at 137 West 71st Street on the Upper West Side of Manhattan in New York City, New York, US. It is notable as the residence of author and activist James Baldwin from 1966 until his death in 1987. Because of its association with Baldwin and his stature as a prominent LGBTQ figure, the house is a New York City designated landmark and listed on the National Register of Historic Places.

The house was built in 1890 and designed by Thom & Wilson for the Farley brothers, a group of local developers, as a single-family residence. In 1960, the house was renovated into a modern-style apartment building with ten units. The front facade of the house is five stories high (including the basement) and measures two bays wide, with a cladding of white glazed brick. Baldwin's apartment, a two-room unit in the basement, was later converted into part of a duplex unit.

== Description ==
The James Baldwin House is at 137 West 71st Street on the Upper West Side of Manhattan in New York City, New York, US. It occupies the northern sidewalk between Broadway to the west and Columbus Avenue to the east. The Dorilton apartment building is at the end of the block to the west, while Verdi Square is slightly to the northwest. The surrounding block of 71st Street is lined with apartment buildings, townhouses, and churches. The house is located within the Upper West Side/Central Park West Historic District, designated by the New York City Landmarks Preservation Commission in 1990.

=== Facade ===
The main elevation of the facade, facing south on 71st Street, is two bays wide and is designed in the modernist style, with a cladding of white glazed brick. The bays are asymmetrical; the left (west) bay is narrower than the right (east) bay. The entrance is in the left bay and is accessed by a stair with iron railings, which descends to the doorway. The entrance is flanked by a granite surround with the address number above the doorway. A glass block wall is located to the right of the ground-floor entrance. On each of the upper stories, the eastern bay has a tripartite group of sash windows, while the western bay has a single-wide sash window. Masonry windowsills extend across the facade beneath each window.

The northern or rear elevation is not visible from the street and dates from the house's original construction in 1890. Like the front elevation, it is divided into a single-wide bay and a tripartite bay. A wing, originally used by servants, protrudes from the east (left) side of the rear elevation and has windows with sills. The rear elevation also has a door leading to the basement.

=== Interior ===
When completed, the building was one residence. Since 1961, the modern-day building has had ten apartments, consisting of two on each floor. The interior retains its finishes from the 1961 renovation, which are relatively simple in design, without decorative trim. The entrance leads to a vestibule with a glass door leading into a ground-floor hall; both spaces have silver-framed gray terrazzo floors. The vestibule has tile walls, and the hall has plaster walls. A narrow terrazzo-stepped staircase with a curved aluminum handrail connects the upper stories; the halls on each story have two apartment doors leading off them.

Three residences were, at points in the late 20th century, occupied by the family of author and activist James Baldwin. Baldwin's own house was a two-room unit occupying 600 square feet (56 m^{2}), spanning the entire width of the basement's rear section. It included two rooms arranged in an L shape. An entrance from the hall led to a living room (with a galley kitchen to the right, which was later removed), and there was a bedroom in the western half of the apartment's rear section. A wall between the two rooms has since been removed, and the apartment itself has since been converted into part of a duplex unit with a staircase to the first floor. Baldwin's mother Emma Berdis Jones lived one floor above him, in Apartment 1B, and his sister Gloria Baldwin Karefa-Smart lived on the top floor, in Apartment 4A.

== History ==
=== Early history ===
137 West 71st Street was built in 1890. It was developed by the Farley brothers as speculative rowhouses, not built for any particular clients. At the time, the Farleys were among numerous late-19th-century developers on the Upper West Side, who had been motivated to build there following the development of mass transit in the neighborhood. 137 West 71st Street was originally part of a series of four houses, all of which were four-story Renaissance Revival structures with raised basements, designed by Thom & Wilson. As built, it had stairs ascending to the first floor. The house was sold in 1897 to E. W. Scott and was occupied by the family of Frank Acer, a white lawyer, in the early 20th century. By 1925, the house hosted a club called the Fireside Club.

The opening of the New York City Subway on the Upper West Side in the early 20th century increased apartment demand in the neighborhood. By the 1930s, the three houses adjoining 137 West 71st Street had all been demolished. After Jack Mandel and Elias Gold bought the building in July 1961, H. Russell Kenyon redesigned it into a modernist apartment house. As part of these renovations, the stair was removed, and the entrance was moved to the basement. The ornamentation was also removed and a new glass-block and white brick facade was added. The interior was subdivided into eight apartments. 137 West 71st Street was, at the time, one of many single-family homes in New York City to be converted into multifamily housing, which tended to be much more profitable for their owners.

=== Baldwin use and later years ===
The El-Rhon Corporation, a firm owned by writer and activist James Baldwin and his family members, bought the house in February 1965; this is sometimes cited as the year Baldwin moved in. At the time, Baldwin was a prominent African-American civil rights activist, and though he did not come out until later in life, he was also a major LGBTQ figure. El-Rhon renovated the building for about $50,000 over the next two years. Baldwin moved into the house in 1966. He lived on the ground floor, which he used as a pied-à-terre during his frequent international travels. His mother and his sister Gloria's family lived above. The rest of the building was rented out to rent-regulated occupants, who generally included Baldwin's former neighbors in Harlem.

Baldwin's family called the building his "headquarters", since that was where fans could contact him even if he was staying elsewhere. Baldwin wrote several books and theatrical scripts, organized events, answered letters, and remained active in the civil-rights movement after moving to the house. Gloria's daughter Aisha later recalled that Baldwin's returns to the United States often brought excitement to the house's other residents. During the 1970s and 1980s, black authors visited the house and Toni Morrison briefly lived there. The writer Eleanor W. Traylor retrospectively wrote in 2011 that Baldwin's other sister Paula designed clothes in the house. Baldwin continued to occupy the house until his death in 1987.

The New York City Landmarks Preservation Commission (LPC) began considering designating the Baldwin House as a city landmark in May 2019, as part of a review of several LGBTQ-related landmark sites, and granted the designation that June. The LPC designation was made in conjunction with that of other major LGBTQ sites such as Caffe Cino and the Gay Activists Alliance Firehouse. In granting the designation, the LPC wrote that the house was "the most significant surviving building in New York City associated with" Baldwin. The same week as the city landmark designation, the house was also nominated to the National Register of Historic Places, being added that September.

== See also ==
- List of New York City Designated Landmarks in Manhattan from 59th to 110th Streets
- National Register of Historic Places listings in Manhattan from 59th to 110th Streets

== Sources ==
- James Baldwin Residence (PDF) (Report). New York City Landmarks Preservation Commission. June 18, 2019.
- National Register of Historic Places Inventory/Nomination: James Baldwin House (Report). National Park Service. September 3, 2019.
