= Ida Abelman =

American painter (1910–2002)

Ida York Abelman (1910–2002) was an American artist and muralist in the 1930s. Abelman was known as a Social Realist. She was born Ida York and lived her early life in New York City. At the age of 19 she married Larry Abelman, also an artist.

== Education ==
She attended Hunter College, and studied at the Grand Central School of Art, the National Academy School of Fine Arts, and the City College of New York. She was a member of the American Artists' Congress and was hired by the Federal Art Project and the Works Progress Administration (WPA), both a part of President Franklin D. Roosevelt's New Deal programs for artists.

== Works ==
Abelman was known for her graphic work that she produced during the Depression. She was heavily influenced by Constructivism, Surrealism, and Social realism. Her works often portrays a machine aesthetic by combining machine parts with human or organic forms to convey the positive and negative aspects of a mechanized society.

Abelman silhouetted her compositions against the full sheet of paper, imparting an abstracted strength to the lithographs that is a hallmark of her personal style.

Her work can be found in several published sources including American Prints of the 1930s (University of Michigan Museum of Art), The Machine Age in American Art, (Brooklyn Museum), 20th Century Prints (Queens College), and A Simple and Vital Design: The Story of the Indiana Post Office Murals (Indiana Historical Society).

== Federal Art Project involvement ==
Abelman was part of the staff of the Graphic Arts Division of the Federal Art Project in New York City from 1936 through 1939. Her artistic point of view and printmaking style made her work particularly suitable to the Project; images of industrial workers and elements of machinery were common parts of her iconography. Two of her prints for the Federal Art Project that illustrate this style are Man and Machine, c. 1939, and Construction, 1939.
