= Beulah Stevenson =

American painter

Beulah Eisle Stevenson (1890–1965) was an American painter and printmaker.

Born in Brooklyn Heights, Stevenson lived there her entire life. In New York she studied at the Pratt Institute and the Art Students League, where her instructors included John Sloan; in Provincetown, she worked with Hans Hofmann.

Her work appeared in many group shows, and she won a number of awards. She was a curator at the Brooklyn Museum for many years, and that museum owns a number of examples of her work, as do the Library of Congress and the New York Public Library.

Stevenson maintained many professional associations during her career; she was president of the New York Society of Women Artists, a board member of the National Association of Women Artists, and a vice-president of the Brooklyn Society of Artists.

She also belonged to the American Artists' Congress; when that organization came to become closer in affiliation to the Communist Party, she left to join the Federation of Modern Painters and Sculptors. Stevenson was said by a friend to have destroyed many of her papers prior to her death, but a collection was donated to the Archives of American Art at the Smithsonian Institution and has been partially digitized.

During Temima Gezari's teens, she took art classes with Beulah. These interactions had a lasting impact on Temima.
