= New York City Farm Colony =

Poorhouse in Staten Island, New York

Coordinates: 40°35′37″N 74°08′19″W

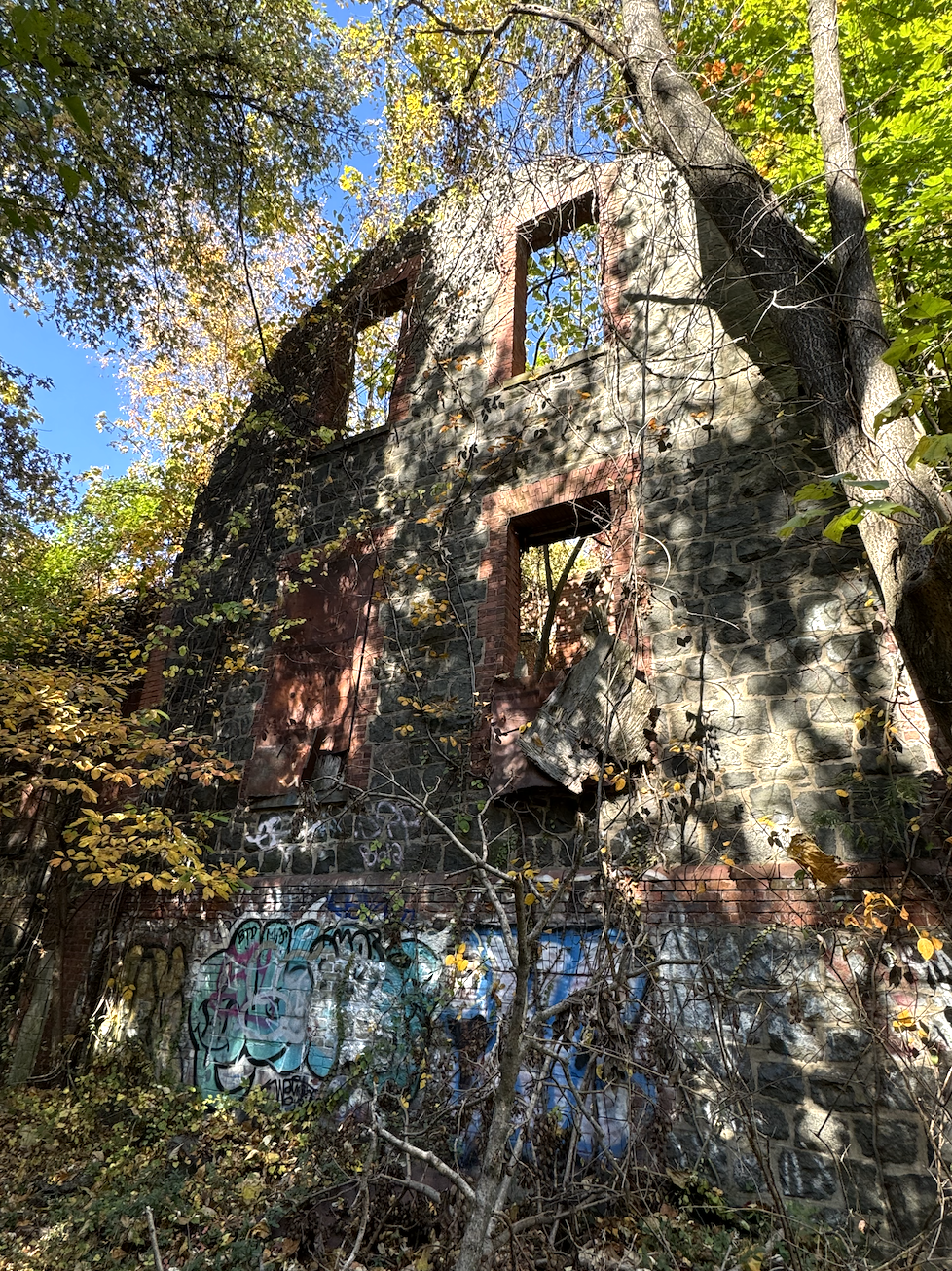
Exterior of the building

The New York City Farm Colony was a poorhouse on the New York City borough of Staten Island, one of the city's five boroughs. It was located across Brielle Avenue from Seaview Hospital, on the edge of the Staten Island Greenbelt.

The New York City Farm Colony and Seaview Hospital make up their own New York City historic district, designated on March 26, 1985, and the site is listed on the National Register of Historic Places.

== History ==
=== Colonial period ===
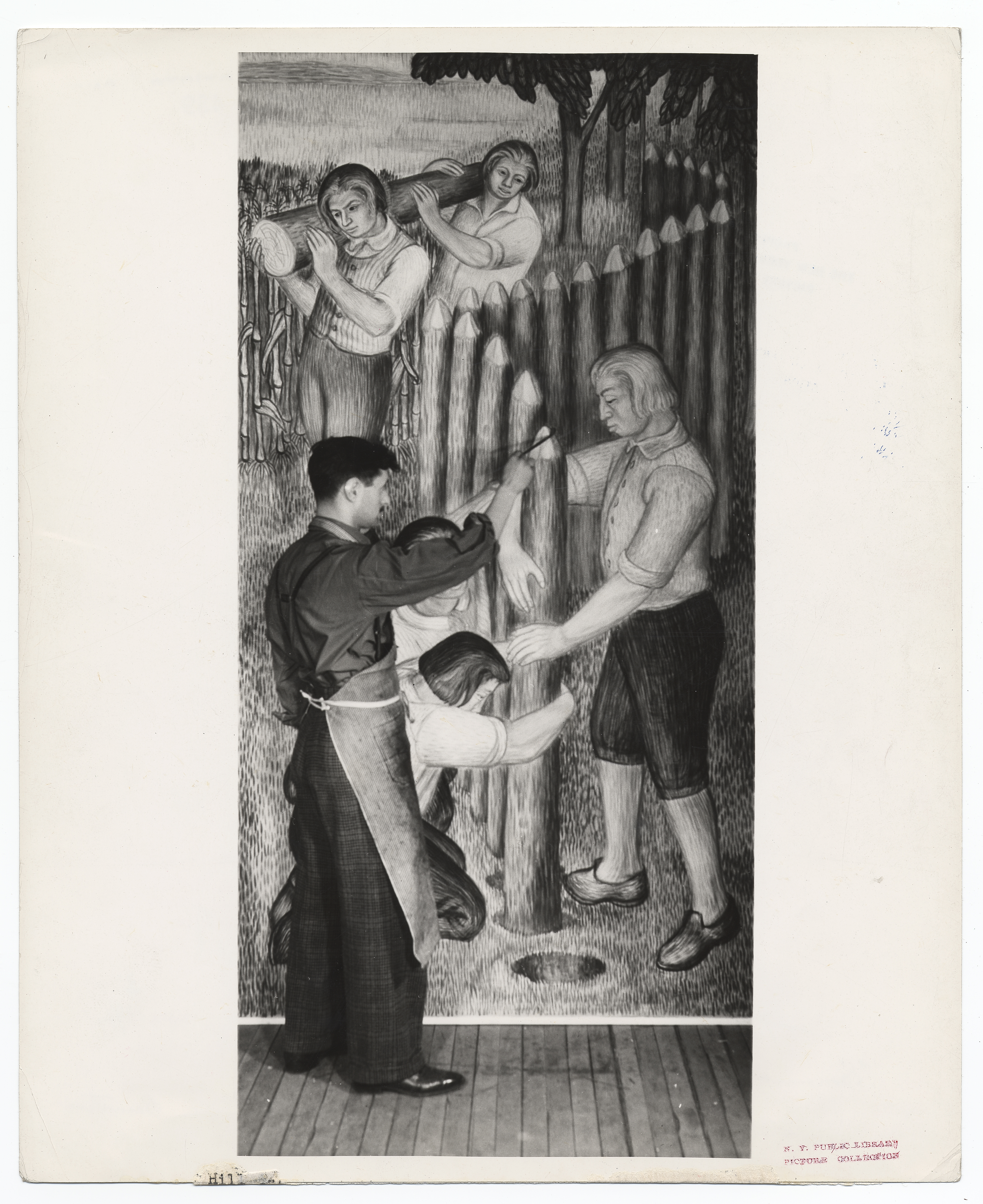
Artist Axel Horn painting a mural inside the Farm Colony as part of the Federal Art Project in 1937. Image from the collection of the Archives of American Art.

Part of the town of Castleton from the 1680s onward, the land was previously a 96-acre farm owned by Stephen Martineau (also "Martino") of Staten Island (Dutch: Staaten Eylandt), which was previously part of New Amsterdam, the capital of New Netherland; and before that, inhabited by the Raritan band of the Unami division of the Lenape.

At the end of the Second Anglo-Dutch War in 1667, the Dutch ceded New Netherland to Kingdom of England in the Treaty of Breda, and the Dutch Staaten Eylandt, anglicized as "Staten Island", became part of the new English colony of New York.

In 1670, Native Americans, including the Lenape, ceded all claims to Staten Island to the English in a deed to Governor Francis Lovelace. In 1671, in order to encourage an expansion of the Dutch settlements, the English resurveyed Oude Dorp (which became known as 'Old Town') and expanded the lots along the shore to the south. These lots were settled primarily by Dutch families, and became known as Nieuwe Dorp (meaning 'New Village'), which later became anglicized as New Dorp.

The earliest known history of the Martineau farm goes back to April 24, 1676, when the land was granted to François Martineau ("Martino"), a French Huguenot immigrant to New Amsterdam from Île de Ré and La Rochelle, France, by the English government. King Louis XIV of France sought to impose total Catholic religious uniformity in France, repealing the Edict of Nantes, which had guaranteed religious freedom for Huguenots, in 1685. It is estimated that anywhere between 150,000 and 300,000 Protestants fled France during the wave of persecution that followed the repeal; François was one such refugee who had previously lived in the Dutch farming village of Haarlem with his family.

In 1683, the colony of New York was divided into ten counties. As part of this process, Staten Island, as well as several minor neighboring islands, was designated as Richmond County. The name derives from the title of Charles Lennox, 1st Duke of Richmond, an illegitimate son of King Charles II of England and his French-born mistress, Louise de Kérouaille, Duchess of Portsmouth.

Stephen Martineau, the great-great-grandson of François Martineau, was born in 1761 on what was called the Oude Dorp (Old Town) Farm, near the northeastern shore of Staten Island. Stephen and his wife, Eleanor Haughwout, had 11 children. It was reportedly one of their daughters, Maria Martineau, who sold the farm in 1829 to the government of Richmond County for $3,000. The Richmond County Poor Farm was established on the land.

=== Modern era ===
When Staten Island became a borough of New York City in 1898, the city assumed responsibility for the property and redesignated it the New York City Farm Colony, although it was sometimes also referred to as the Staten Island Farm Colony. In 1915, its administration was merged with that of Seaview Hospital, which had been set up with the expressed purpose of treating tuberculosis (it is now a city-run nursing home, under the new name of Sea View Farms).

Jurisdiction over the site was transferred in 1924 to the city's Homes for Dependents agency, which lifted the requirement that all residents of the colony had to work – with most of the work involving the cultivation of many varieties of fruits and vegetables, and at various times even grains such as wheat and corn; these crops fed not only the colony's residents but met the needs of other city institutions as well.

For several years, the bank robber Willie Sutton, having broken prison in West Philadelphia and returned to his native New York, lived and worked at the Farm Colony, making many friends, and occasionally still carrying out robberies on the side, for which he was eventually recaptured.

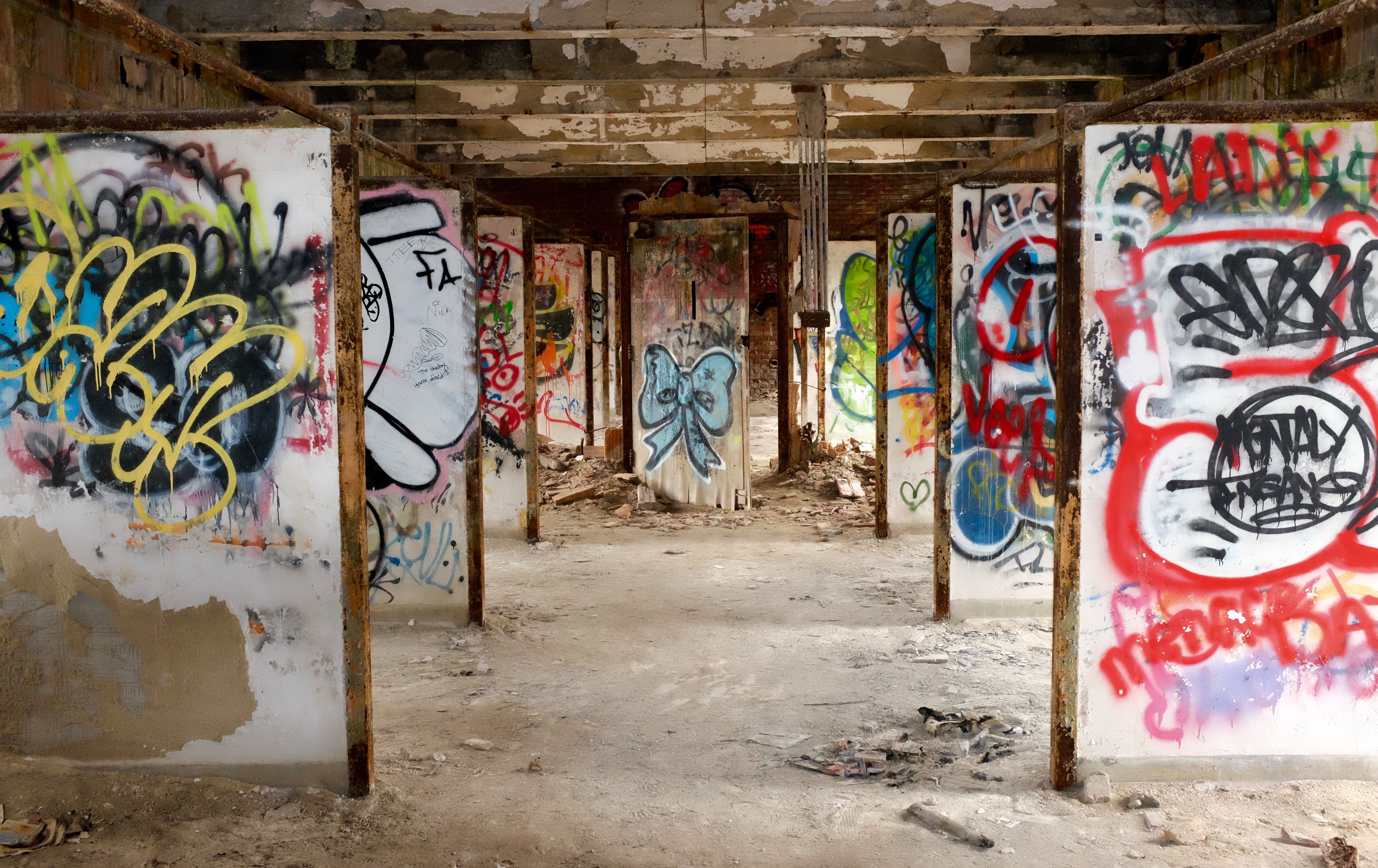
The interior of one of the farm's buildings in 2016. The partitions have been painted with graffiti.

Until the 1930s, many if not most of the farm colony's residents were elderly, and at times numbered as many as 2,000; this number steadily declined after the Social Security system was adopted on the federal level in the United States (although noted photographer Alice Austen lived there for a brief period in the early 1950s), and the programs of the Great Society implemented in the 1960s further depleted its ranks, leading to the facility being closed in 1975.

Since its closure, the Farm Colony site has been the focus of debate over land use. In 1980, the city attempted to sell the property to developers, but environmentalists and many Staten Islanders resisted the sale. As a result, in 1982, the city's Department of General Services was given authority over the land; this agency in turn transferred 25 acres (10 ha) to the New York City Department of Parks and Recreation, which annexed the section to the Greenbelt. The remaining 70 acres (28 ha) at the site were officially designated a city landmark in 1985; many buildings remain standing at the colony, but have fallen into disrepair, and have also been subjected to vandalism.

In 1993, a Babe Ruth League baseball diamond was built on Farm Colony land; a second field was added in 2001. The former 96-acre site is now 43 acres due to the development of ball fields, and adding sections of the property to the local green belt.

A 2020 article about the property, stated that the site has been vacant for four decades, but was "being redeveloped into a multi-use complex with commercial space, and...housing options". However, as of August 2022, the project appeared to be dead, with no progress made.
