= American Artists' Congress =

Marxist organization for writers and artists 1929-1935

American Artists' Congress (AAC)
- Predecessor: John Reed Clubs
- Successor: Artists League of America
- Formation: 1936
- Founder: Jose de Creeft, Werner Drewes, Todros Geller, Eitaro Ishigaki, Rockwell Kent, Jerome Klein, Barbara Morgan, Alexander Trachtenberg
- Merger of: 1942
- Headquarters: New York City
- Official language: English

The American Artists' Congress (AAC) was an organization founded in February 1936 as part of the popular front of the Communist Party USA as a vehicle for uniting graphic artists in projects helping to combat the spread of fascism. During World War II the organization was merged into the Artists' Council for Victory, which effectively spelled the end of the organization.

== Organizational history ==
=== Origins ===
The Great Depression and the rise of fascism in the 1930s caused politics and arts to collide as cultural liberals united to work on common goals. Communist parties adopted a policy of forming broad alliances with anybody willing to oppose fascism and became known as the Popular Front. After the official formation of the United Front in 1935, artists in the U.S. began seeing themselves as the “guardians of liberal and democratic ideals”

Social art became significant, with 1933–38 seeing the formation of the John Reed Clubs, the Artists Union, the Harlem Artists Guild, and the American Artists' Congress. Artists had an idealistic view of working-class culture and used the labor movement as a sort of prototype for their mission. There was a shift in the patronage, subject matter, and position of the art produced during this time.

By 1934 and 1935, it became clear that the John Reed Clubs' sectarian policies were not congruent with the Popular Front. At a meeting of the John Reed Club, the idea of an American Artists' Congress was discussed and twelve of those present were given the task of organizing it. Stuart Davis was put in charge of forming its committee. Almost all of those involved with creating the AAC were established figures of the Communist left and had some connection with the John Reed Clubs.

=== Mission ===
The AAC hoped to establish a group of artists who realized that collective organization was necessary to combat fascism. Politically and artistically, the congress attempted to distinguish itself from the John Reed clubs, which were specifically radical and rigidly adhered to a particular set of views. By creating a group that was non-sectarian and tolerant of all affiliations, the AAC fit in with the goal of the Popular Front.

In 1936, the chairman of the congress stated that “The Congress does not demand any political alignments…all we ask is that artists who realize the threat of fascism come together, discuss the situation, and form an organization of artists for their own insurance…we do not want any emphasis on extreme radicalism."

The AAC was directed towards artists who believed that the cultural crisis was a reflection of the world economic crisis. Their specific concerns were violations of international civil liberties, the inadequacy of government programs, censorship, and the decline of traditional forms of patronage.

=== Early activity ===
The membership brochure of the AAC read: “Membership in the Congress is open to any artist of the first rank living in the U.S. without regard to the way he paints or the subject matter he chooses to deal with in his work. The only standard for membership is whether he has achieved a position of distinction in his profession and the only requirement that he support the program of the Congress against war and fascism.”

At the first congress meeting in 1936, the slogan was “Against War and Fascism." By the next year, the AAC toned down its platform and changed the slogan to “For Peace, for Democracy, for Cultural Progress." The congress was anti-fascism and pro-democracy, and did not take a stance in favor of proletarian revolution as the John Reed Clubs had done. As a result, the congress attracted a wide group of artists with different backgrounds, styles, and political commitments. In November 1936, the congress claimed to have 550 members with branches in Cleveland, St. Louis, New Orleans, and Los Angeles.

Their first activity was to boycott the exhibition of paintings to be held in conjunction with the 1936 Olympic Games in Berlin. Internationally, the congress denounced Nazi repression in Germany and fascist aggression in Spain and China. They condemned censorship in the home and of artwork, and put on annual anti-fascist exhibits.

Due to the status of many of its members, the AAC was able to generate publicity and a greater impact in the art world. It lobbied for a permanent federal art program, fought for a museum rental fee for exhibitors, and worked to get a showing of contemporary American art at the New York World's Fair. In 1938, the Republican gains of the mid-term elections caused such federal art projects to be rendered more conservative.

=== The Loyalist Movement in Spain ===
Internationally, the suffering in Spain under fascism was of particular priority to the AAC. They devoted a great deal of political and artistic efforts to the Loyalist cause. The organization urged lifting the American embargo of arms to the Loyalists and revising the Neutrality Act of 1937, which prohibited such aid. Also in 1937, they organized theme exhibitions referring to the Spanish Civil War, which raised money to send ambulances, food, and clothing supplies to the Loyalists. These exhibitions make clear that the most prominent anti-fascist artists were concentrating on the plight in Spain.

Along with several organizations, the AAC formed the American Artists and Writers Ambulance Corps for Spain. In 1939, the AAC was able to bring Pablo Picasso's painting Guernica to New York to be exhibited at the Valentine Gallery to raise money for the Spanish Refugee Relief Campaign. These attempts to help the Loyalist cause created organizational motivation for antifascist artwork that depicted images in Spain. The resulting paintings were not literal representations of the conflicting parties in Spain but images of the essence of human suffering. The various styles of paintings reflect the diversity of the artists aesthetic tastes and techniques.

=== Dissolution ===
The AAC had a close association with the Communist party and eventually experienced fundamental dissension in beliefs. At a meeting in 1940, to the shock of many members, the Congress endorsed the Russian invasion of Finland. It was believed that this implicitly defended Hitler's position by assigning the responsibility for the war to England and France. In addition, according to a succession letter, the Congress loosened its policy of boycotting Fascist and Nazi exhibits.

At this time, 17 prominent members left the Congress, writing a letter of succession detailing why. The AAC continued to function primarily with other organizations through 1941, but dissolved soon after U.S. entrance into the war. The Congress then participated in a meeting called the Artists' Societies for National Defense, which established the Artists' Council for Victory, an organization that combined twenty-three artists' societies.

In May 1942 the American Artists' Congress merged with the Artists Union, thus creating the Artists League of America.

== People ==
=== Founders ===
- Stuart Davis
- Jose de Creeft
- Werner Drewes
- Todros Geller
- Eitaro Ishigaki
- Rockwell Kent
- Jerome Klein
- Barbara Morgan (photographer)
- Alexander Trachtenberg

=== Members ===
- Ida Abelman
- Maxine Albro
- Victor Arnautoff
- Maurice Becker
- Earl Browder
- Stuart Davis
- Adolf Dehn
- Mabel Dwight
- Dorothy Eisner
- Joseph Freeman
- Hugo Gellert
- Mike Gold
- William Gropper
- Lena Gurr
- George Albert Harris
- Mary E. Hutchinson
- John Opper
- Meyer Schapiro
- Saul Schary
- Moses Soyer
- Alexander Stavenitz
- Beulah Stevenson
- Herbert Ferber

=== Associates ===
Most of these artists were either delegates to AAC events or exhibited at AAC shows:

- Gladys Aller
- Harold Ambellan
- Milton Avery
- Luis Arenal Bastar
- Jólan Gross-Bettelheim
- Edward Biberman
- George Biddle
- Ilya Bolotowsky
- Alexander Calder
- José Clemente Orozco
- Philip Evergood
- Lorser Feitelson
- Adolph Gottlieb
- Helen West Heller
- Jack Kufeld
- Yasuo Kuniyoshi
- Winifred Milius Lubell
- Claire Mahl Moore
- Lewis Mumford
- J. B. Neumann
- Isamu Noguchi
- Saul Schary
- Ben Shahn
- David Alfaro Siqueiros
- Raphael Soyer
- James Johnson Sweeney
- Rufino Tamayo
- Max Weber

== See also ==
- John Reed Club
- Jerome Klein
