= Gertrude Boyle Kanno =

American sculptor

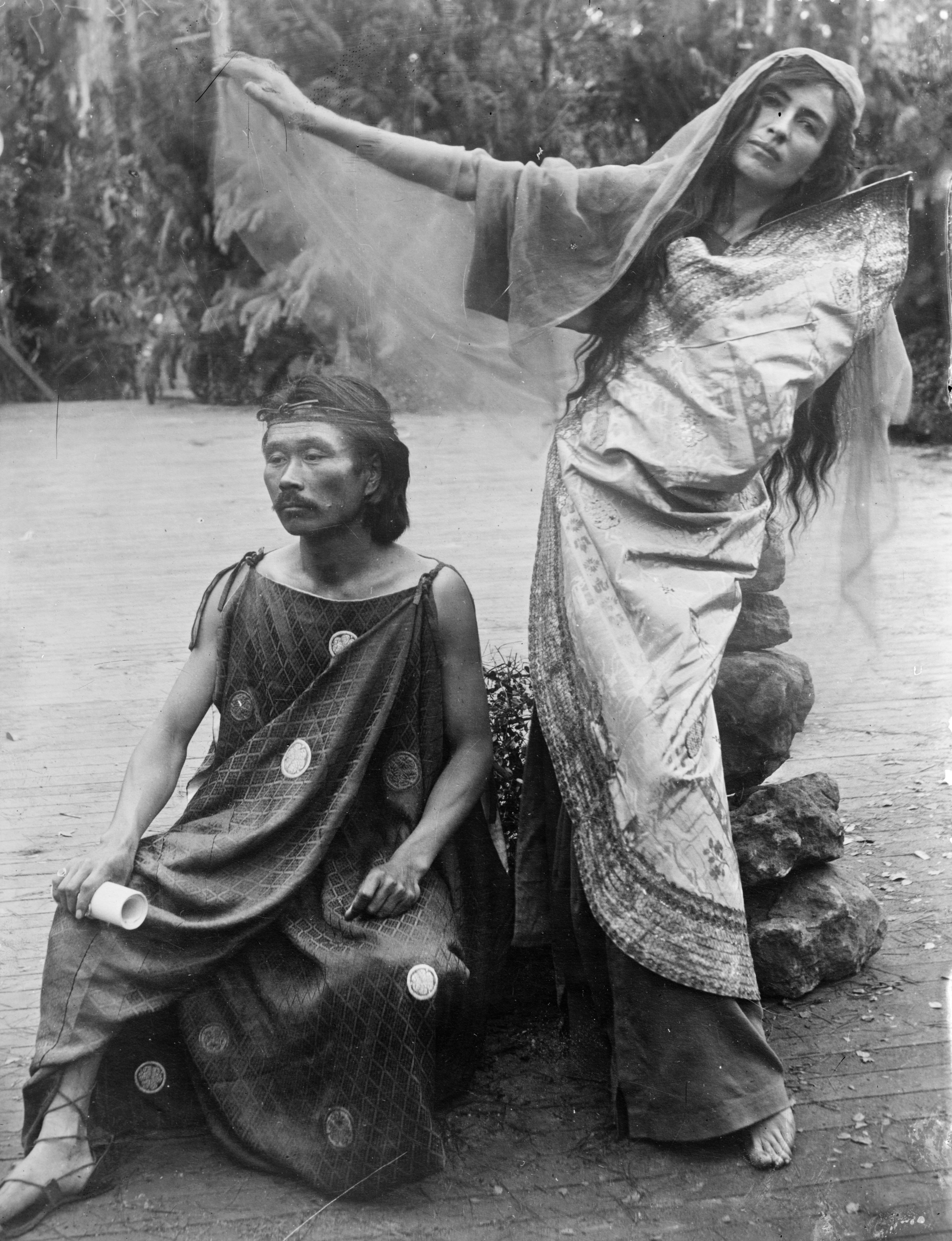
- Gertrude Boyle Kanno with husband Takeshi in 1914
- Born: January 26, 1878; San Francisco, California
- Died: August 14, 1937 (aged 59)
- Education: Cogswell College, Lick School (California School of Mechanical Arts), Mark Hopkins Institute of Art
- Known for: Sculpture
- Spouse: Takeshi Kanno

Gertrude Farquharson Boyle Kanno (January 26, 1878 – August 14, 1937) was an American sculptor noted for her portrait busts.

== Biography ==
Boyle was born in San Francisco on January 26, 1878. She was the sixth child of John Boyle and Helen Milliken Clark. She met Japanese poet Takeshi Kanno at Joaquin Miller's summer home, The Hights. They were married in Seattle, Washington, on May 22, 1907. They lived in a bungalow on the estate of Joaquin Miller, close to the poet's home. In 1915 she sought divorce with the complaint of Kanno's extreme jealousy and refusal to provide, and the statement that she had "supported herself entirely by her own labor".

She attended Cogswell College, Lick School (California School of Mechanical Arts) and Mark Hopkins Institute of Art. She studied under Douglas Tilden and Arthur Mathews.

In New York after 1915, she lived with Eitaro Ishigaki until about 1928.

She was art editor of the Birth Control Review for about three years.

== Work ==
Boyle did portrait busts and medallions in plaster and bronze of many famous persons including: Isadora Duncan, Eitaro Ishigaki, Henry Cowell, Uldrick Thompson, Margaret Miller, Teddy Roosevelt, Franklin D. Roosevelt, John Muir, Ida Tarbell, Ezra Meeker, John Swett, Joseph LeConte, David Starr Jordan, Joaquin Miller, Edwin Markham, William Keith, Luther Burbank, Albert Einstein, Charles Erskine Scott Wood, John Fremont, Susan Mills, Horace Traubel, Christy Mathewson and Sidney Gulick.

She was selected by Joaquin Miller to create a portrait of his mother for the University of Oregon and also executed a bust of the notable poet which she titled "The Spirit of the West". It is displayed at the Montalvo Arts Center in Saratoga, CA.

She died on August 14, 1937, at St. John's Hospital.

=== Local work in the San Francisco Bay Area ===
Art includes various works accessible to the public, including bronze bust of Joseph LeConte created during the year of his death in 1901. The plaster version is held in the University of California Archives. The finished bronze sculpture is located at UC Berkeley in the Earth Sciences & Map Library.

Her work displayed at the Montalvo Arts Center in Saratoga, CA.

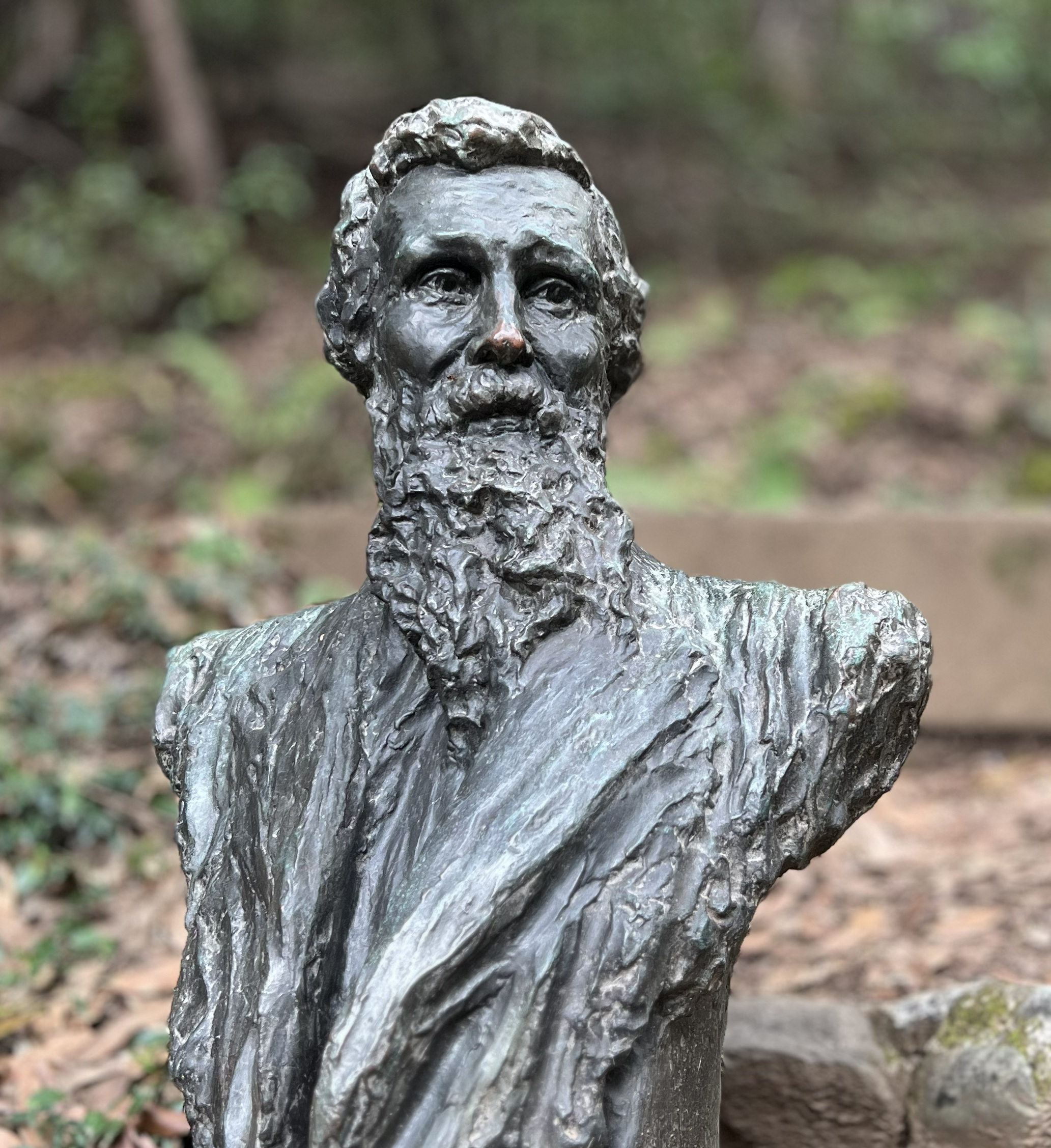
John Muir 1902, by Gertrude Boyle Kanno

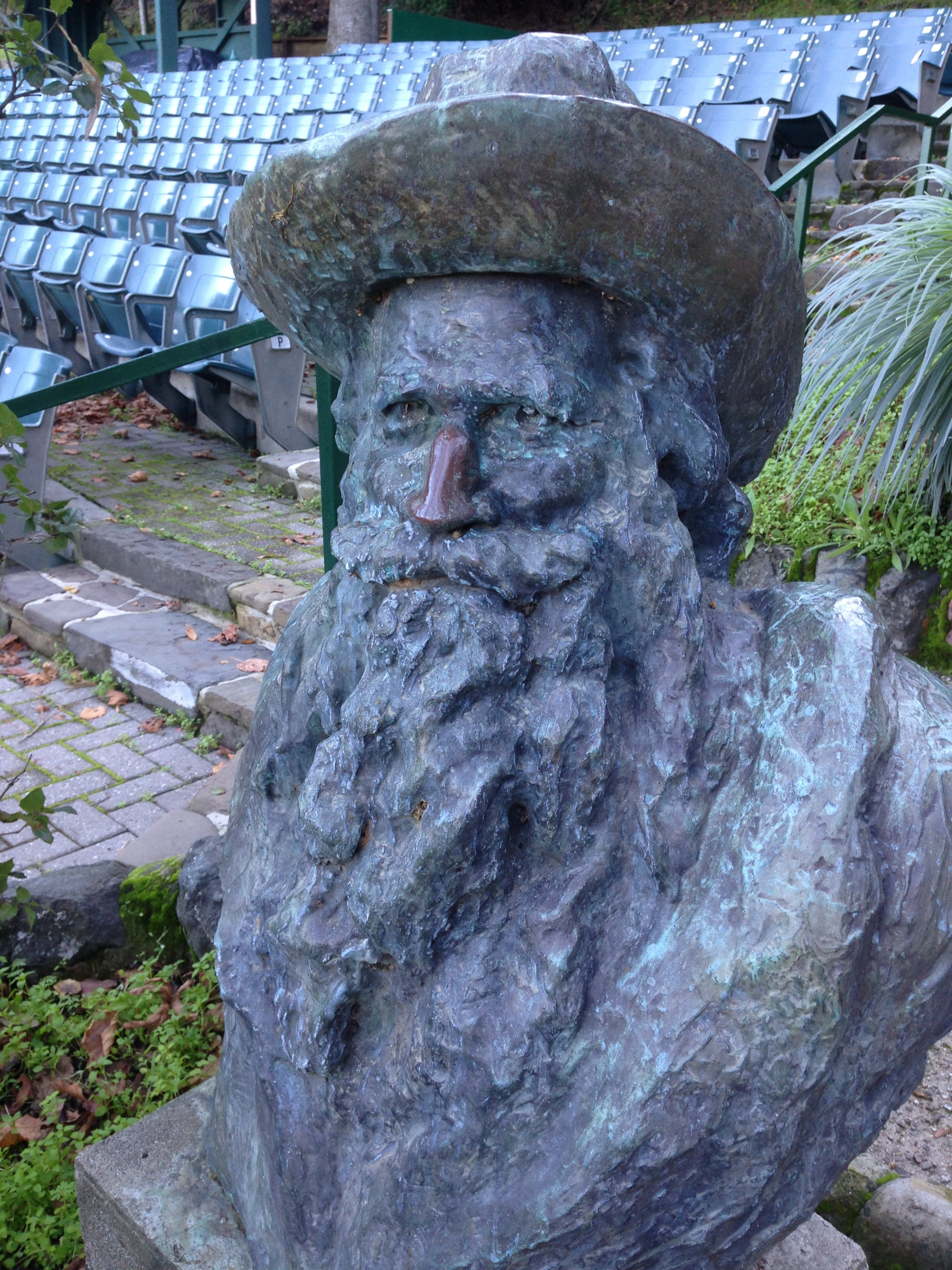
Joaquin Miller 1928, by Gertrude Boyle Kanno

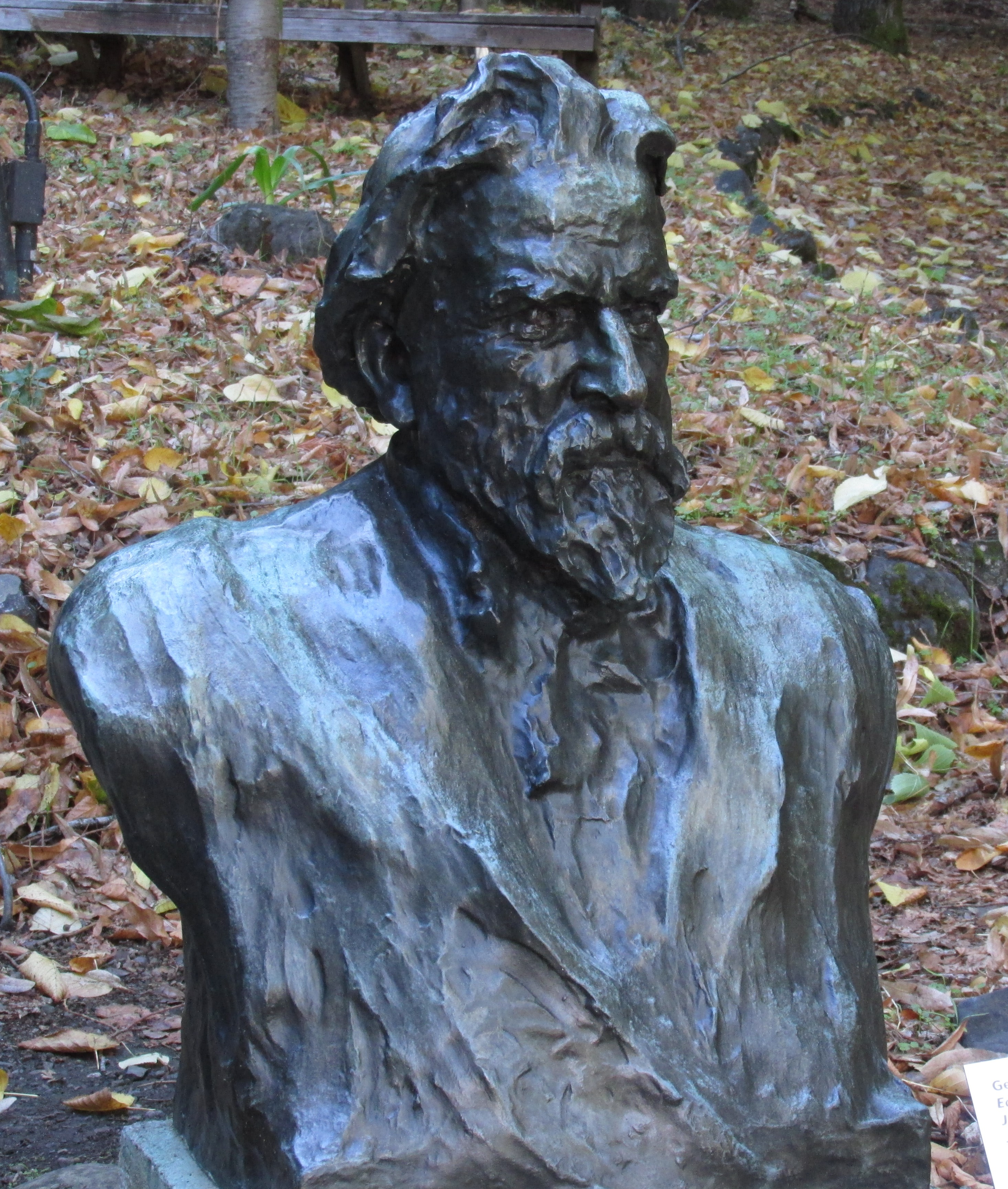
Edwin Markham 1928, by Gertrude Boyle Kanno
