= David Karfunkle =

American painter

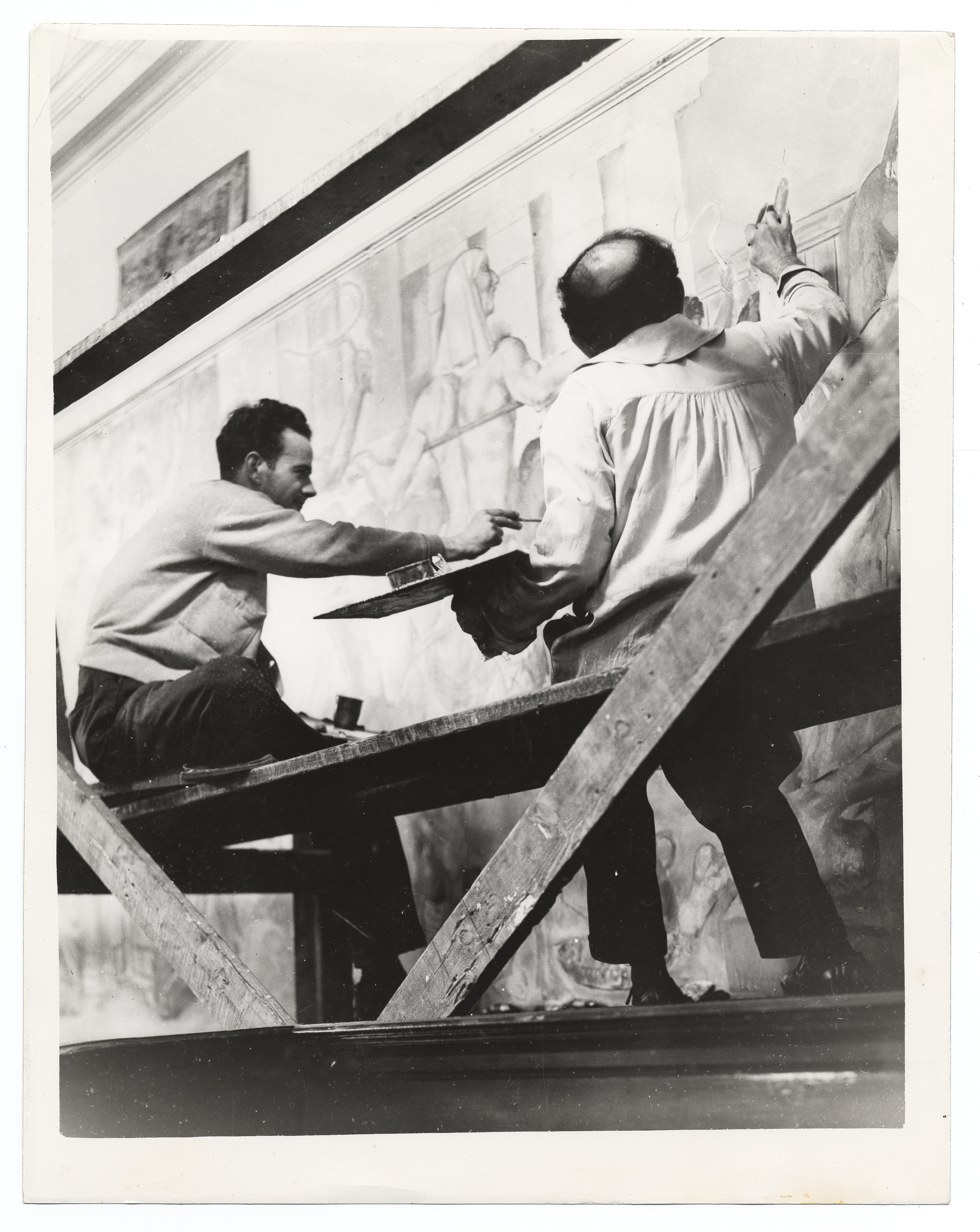
- David Karfunkle, from the Archives of American Art
- Born: 1880
- Died: 1959 (aged 78–79); Vienna
- Education: National Academy of Design
- Known for: Painting, muralist

David Karfunkle (1880–1959) was an American artist. He is known for his mural, "Exploitation of Labor and Hoarding of Wealth", painted in 1936 at the Harlem Courthouse.

== Biography ==
He was born in Vienna. He studied with Ludwig von Herterich, and Antoine Bourdelle. He studied at the National Academy of Design, with William Glackens. In 1911, he showed at the Salmagundi Club. In 1916, he had a group exhibition at the Strauss Gallery.

He was a member of the Federal Art Project.
