= Jerome Klein =

American art historian

Jerome Klein was an American art historian and art critic and a founding member of the American Artists' Congress (AAC).

== Education ==
Klein graduated from Columbia College in 1925 and the Columbia Graduate School of Arts and Sciences in 1932.

== Career ==
Klein began his career as an instructor in art history at Columbia University in the late 1920s, the only member of the department interested in modern art. In 1933 Klein signed a letter protesting the decision of the university to invite Hans Luther, the Ambassador from Nazi Germany, to speak at Columbia. Although other professors also signed the letter, Klein’s return address left on one of the letters by a careless student opponent of fascism identified Klein as the ringleader. According to Stephen H. Norwood, Columbia University President Nicholas Murray Butler, an admirer of Italian and German fascism, fired Klein for signing the letter.

Klein became the art critic for the New York Post, writing also for other publications. He was a champion of the socialist artists of the 1930s, calling for a “broad, unified social-artistic engineering which would transform man’s environment for the benefit of man.”

In 1935 Klein was a founding member of the American Artists' Congress, organized in response to the call of the Popular Front and the American Communist Party for formations of literary and artistic groups against the spread of Fascism. His image can be seen in the drawing of the congress organizers by Peppino Mangravite.

== Bibliography ==
- Modern Masters, from Manet to Gauguin, 1938
