= Jolán Gross-Bettelheim =

Hungarian artist active in New York 1925 to 1956

Jolan Gross-Bettelheim
- Self portrait c. 1929
- Born: January 28, 1900; Nyitra, Hungary (now Nitra, Slovakia)
- Died: July 29, 1972 (aged 72); Budapest, Hungary
- Known for: Printmaker

Jolán Gross-Bettelheim (January 28, 1900–July 29, 1972) was a Hungarian artist who lived and worked in the United States from 1925 to 1956, before returning to Hungary.

== Early life and education ==
Gross-Bettelheim was born on January 28, 1900, in Nyitra, Hungary, (now Nitra, Slovakia), but lived in the United States from 1925 to 1956. She studied painting at the Budapest School of Fine Art in 1919, followed by studies at the Kunstgewerbeschule in Vienna and the Akademie der Bildenden Künst in Berlin. Gross-Bettelheim then studied in Paris at the Académie de Grande Chaumière between 1922 and 1924. She married a Hungarian-born radiologist, Frigyes Bettelheim, and settled in Cleveland by 1925. Her studies in Ohio commenced at the Cleveland School of Art with modernist painter Henry Keller. She and her husband relocated to New York City in 1938. As a communist, Gross-Bettelheim was a member of the John Reed Club, as well as the American Artists’ Congress. She contributed to leftist publications such as New Masses and the Daily Worker.

== Cleveland and the WPA ==
Gross-Bettelheim worked in Cleveland at a time when printmaking was flourishing. It was a time when lithography was seen as a viable art form, rather than being limited to commercial use. Interest in printmaking was bolstered by art organizations that were founded in the 1920s. And the Cleveland Print Makers (CPM) was formed in 1930 by artist and teacher Kálmán Kubinyi. It engaged in numerous activities to expand exposure for Cleveland printmakers, with the goal of increasing the sales of their works. Its most ambitious activity was the Print Mart or Market during which artists opened a gallery to sell works to the general public. The Print Market featured America Today in November 1936, an exhibition that was held in thirty U.S. cities simultaneously. The show included 100 prints created by artists from the American Artists' Congress, including Gross-Bettelheim. Gross-Bettelheim also was commissioned to create a print for the CPM’s Print-a-Month series, a subscription for one print per month by Cleveland and some nonresident artists.

The Works Progress Administration (WPA) Federal Art Project (FAP) had a graphic arts division of which printmaking was a part. A graphic arts workshop was set up in Cleveland as a part of the WPA, operating officially as Graphic Arts Project No. 8048 from December 1935 to 1943, being most productive in 1936-37. Gross-Bettelheim produced prints for the WPA graphics workshop, as well. The American Institute of Graphic Arts (AIGA) sponsored a traveling exhibition, Fifty Prints of the Year, which included work by Gross-Bettelheim.

== Later life ==
She returned to Hungary after 1956, and died in Budapest on July 29, 1972.

== Themes ==
Gross-Bettelheim’s prints explore the darkness of the Great Depression, employing a cubist style that heightens the drama of cityscapes and the industrial landscape. Sabine Kretzschmar describes Gross-Bettelheim as “the purest modernist” amongst Cleveland printmakers, reflecting the influence of German expressionism, constructivism, and cubism.

Her work explored social and political issues. The plight of unemployment is addressed in her print In the Employment Office (ca. 1936, lithograph) and racism in Workers Meeting (Scottsboro Boys) (ca. 1935, drypoint).

The stark black and white images convey a sense of humanity being oppressed by the scale of industry. For example, Gross-Bettelheim’s ca. 1940 lithograph Assembly Line portrays a claustrophobic space filled with workers and a haunting image of lines of gas masks on a factory assembly line. Her 1936 lithograph Civilization at the Crossroads (Fascism II) depicts the rising threat of Fascism in Europe.

== Gallery ==
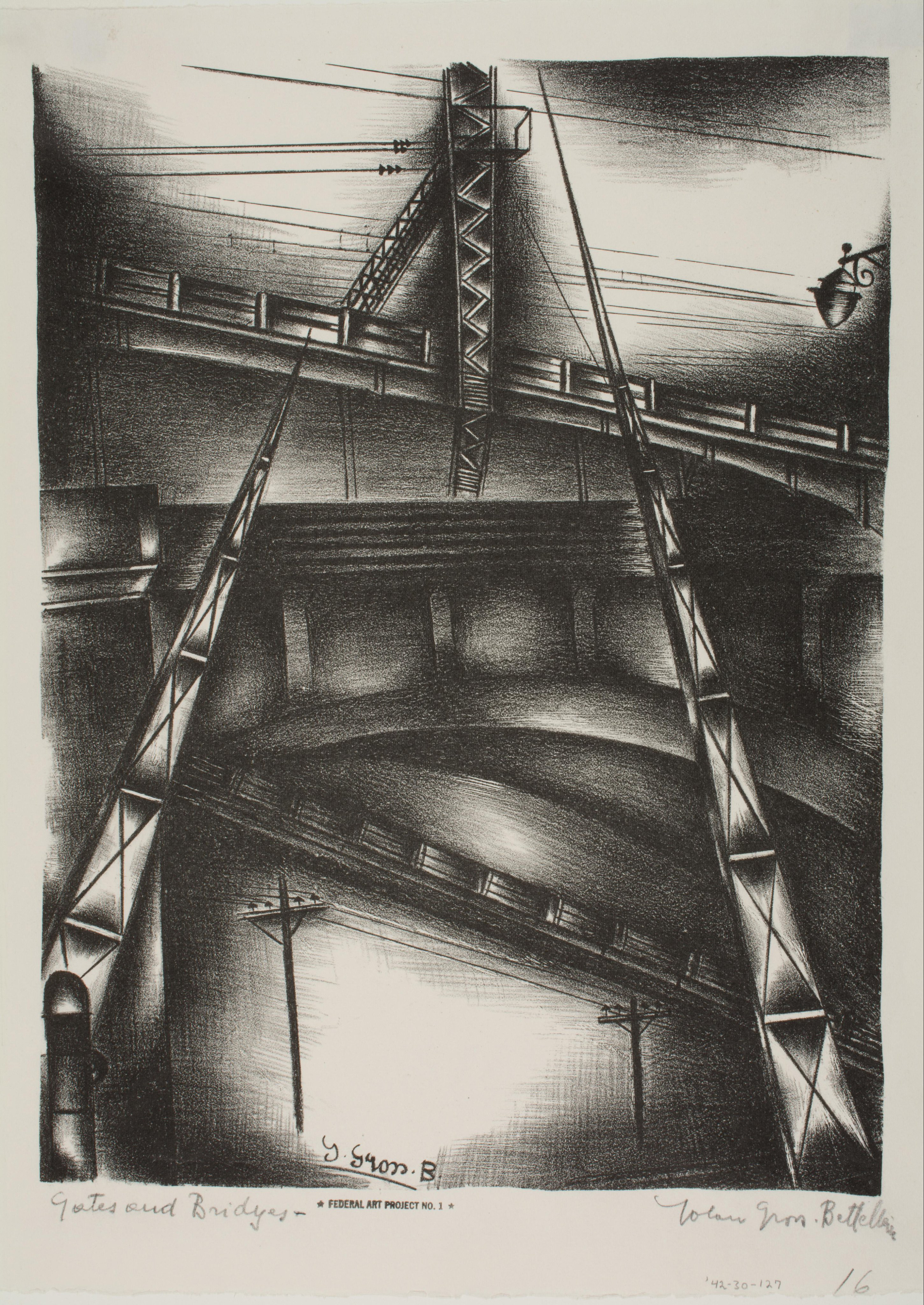
Gates and Bridges, 1936

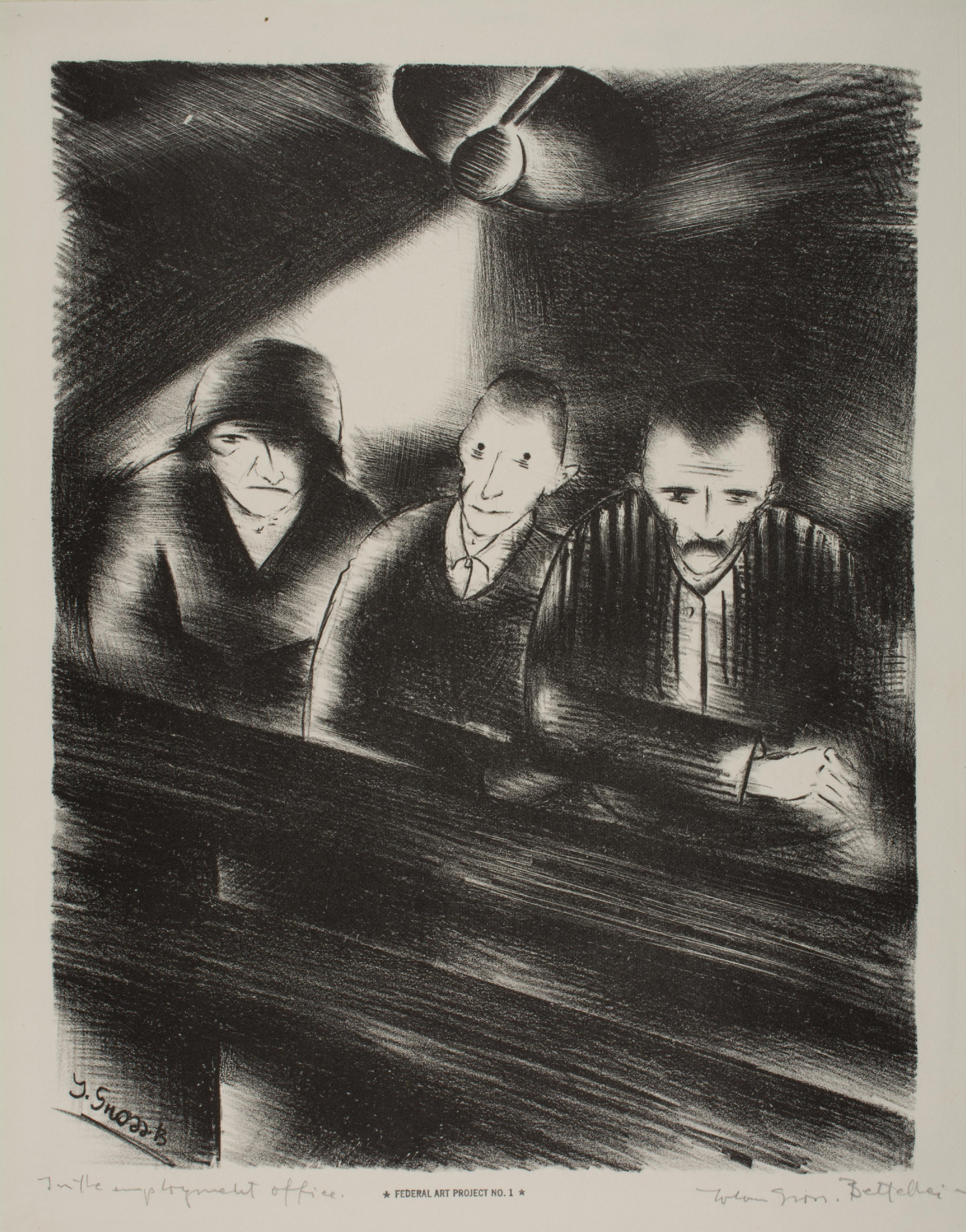
In the Employment Office, 1936

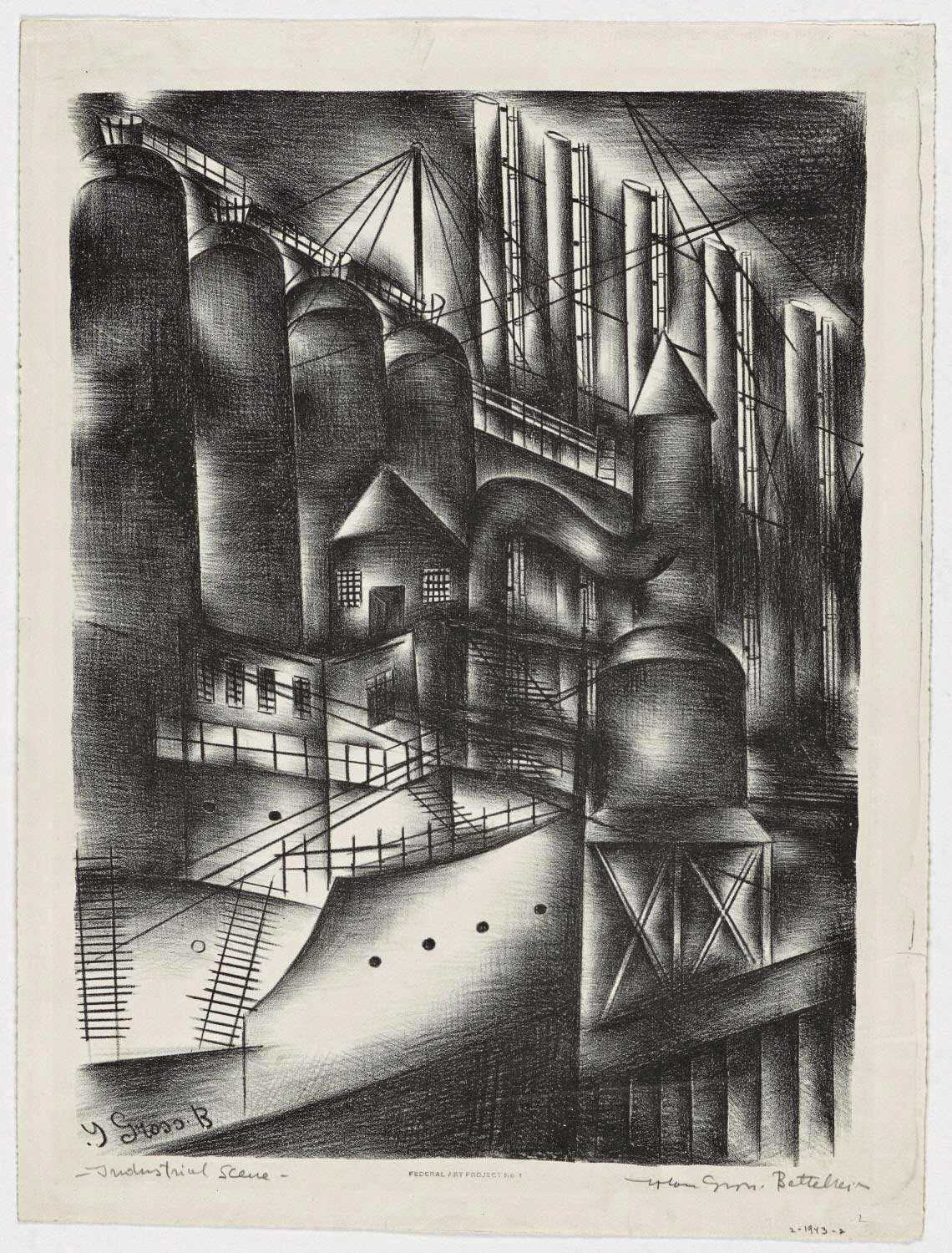
Industrial Scene c. 1937

== Collections ==
- Smithsonian American Art Museum, Washington, D.C.
- Cleveland Museum of Art, Cleveland, OH.
- Art Institute of Chicago, Chicago, IL.
- Zimmerli Art Museum at Rutgers University, New Brunswick, NJ.
- University of Michigan Museum of Art, Ann Arbor, MI.
- Akron Art Museum, Akron, OH.

== Exhibitions ==
- May Shows at the Cleveland Museum of Art 1927-1937 (annual exhibition) [except for 1933]
- Kokoon Club, 1932, first solo exhibition
- American Today, 1936
- American Artists’ Conference Exhibition, 1938
- Artists for Victory, 1942, at Metropolitan Museum of Art in New York
- Artists for Victory, 1943 [show held in 36 museums simultaneously]
- America in the War, 1943
- Library of Congress annual print shows, Washington, DC 1943-1950
- Annual Exhibition of Northwest Printmakers, Seattle Art Museum, 1944-1953
- Durand-Ruel Galleries in Manhattan, 1945
- Art Institute of Chicago, 2 watercolor shows
- Modernist Abstraction in American Prints, Laguna Art Museum, 1992
- Jolán Gross-Bettelheim: The American Prints, Print and Drawing Study Room of the Faulconer Gallery, Grinnell College, Grinnell, Iowa April 27-May 21, 2001
- Jolán Gross-Bettelheim: An American Printmaker in an Age of Progress” Eisenberg Gallery in the Jane Voorhees Zimmerli Art Museum in New Brunswick., NJ Mar 19, 2011 - Jul 31, 2011

== See also ==
- American Artists’ Congress
- List of Federal Art Project artists
- Society of American Graphic Artists

== Bibliography ==
- American Artists’ Congress
- Artists and the War Against Fascism: Papers of the First American Artists’ Congress. Introduction by Matthew Baigell and Julia Williams. New Brunswick: Rutgers University Press, 1986.
- Adams, Clinton. “Gross-Bettelheim, Jolán (1900-1972)” in North American Women Artists of the Twentieth Century: A Biographical Dictionary, eds. Jules Heller, Nancy G. Heller. E-book: Routledge, 2013.
- Bischoff, Dan. “A feminine artist's slant on industry, war, government.” Star Ledger 3/20/2011.
- Curis, Cathy. “O.C. ART REVIEW Encounter With the Unknown: Yes, 'Modernist Abstraction in American Prints' in Laguna Beach has Calder, Pollock and Weber, but most of the 60 artists represented here are obscure.” Los Angeles TimesJune 2, 1992
- Fusco, Tony. “The W.P.A. Prints of Jolan Gross-Bettelheim.” Washington Print Club Quarterly Vol. 32, no. 2, 1996.
- Hemingway, Andrew. Artists on the Left: American Artists and the Communist Movement, 1926-1956. New Haven: Yale University Press, 2002.
- Jolán Gross-Bettelheim 1900-1972. Passau, Germany: Museum Moderner Kunst, 1996.
- Jolán Gross-Bettelheim: Graphic Works Selected from Vörösváry’s Collection. Kecskemét, Hungary: Kecskeméti Galéria, 1987.
- Jolán Gross-Bettelheim: Retrospektív Kiállítása (Retrospective Exhibition). Introduction by Loránd Hegyi. Budapest, Kiállítóterem, 1988.
- Langa, Helen. “Egalitarian Vision, Gendered Experience: Women printmakers and the WPA/FAP graphic arts project.” In The Expanding Discourse: Feminism and Art History, eds. Norma Broude and Mary D. Garrard. New York: Icon Editions, 1992: 409-423.
- Schwendener, Martha. “Celebrating Progress While Recoiling from It.” New York Times, June 17, 2011
- Jolan Gross-Bettelheim prints in New-Brunswickreview
- Taylor, Francis Henry. Artists for Victory: an Exhibition of Contemporary American Art: Paintings, Sculpture, Prints/sponsored by Artists for Victory, Inc. New York: The Metropolitan Museum of Art, 1942.
