= Axel Horn =

American artist

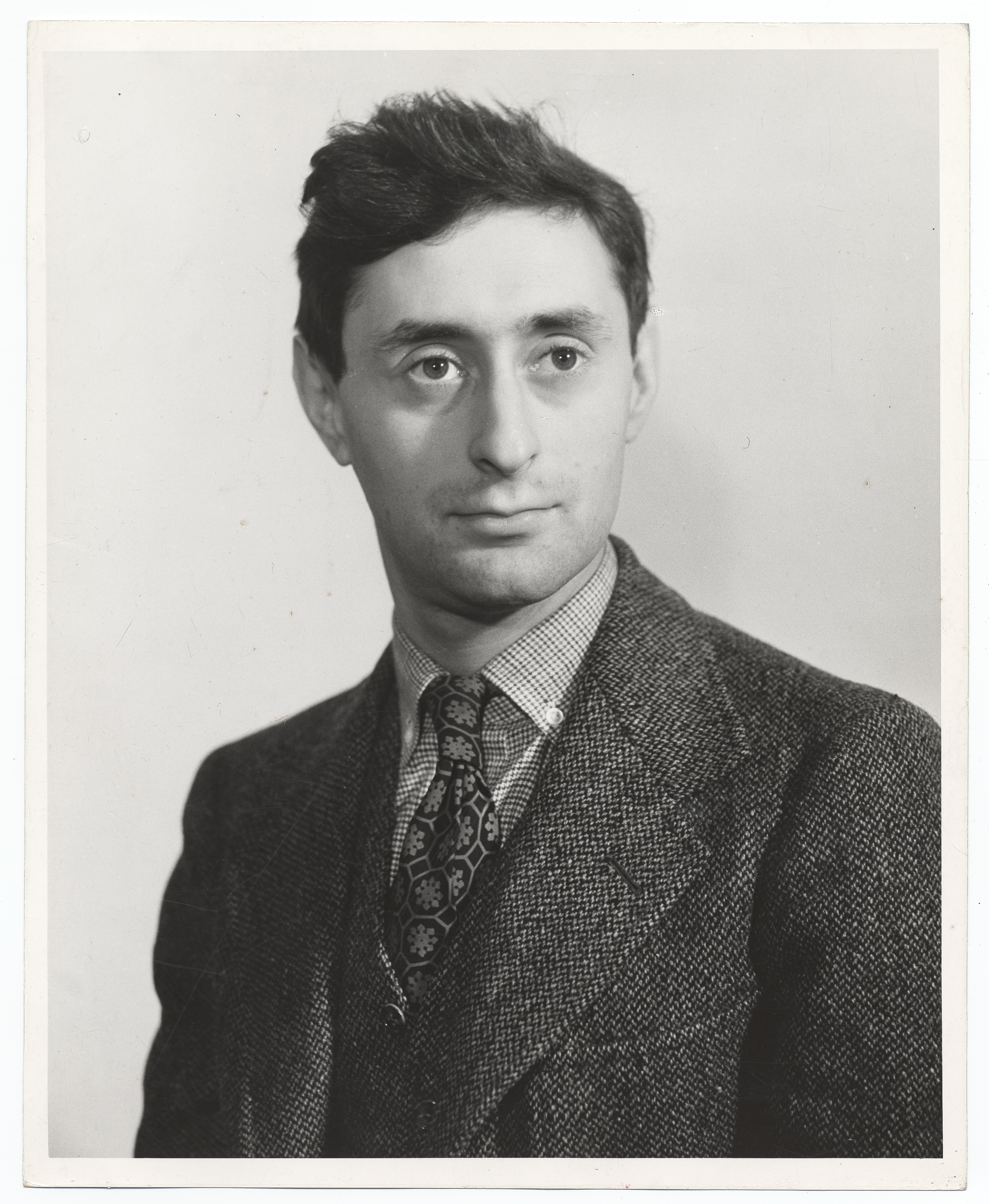
- Born: January 11, 1913
- Died: March 5, 2001 (aged 88)
- Known for: Painter, muralist

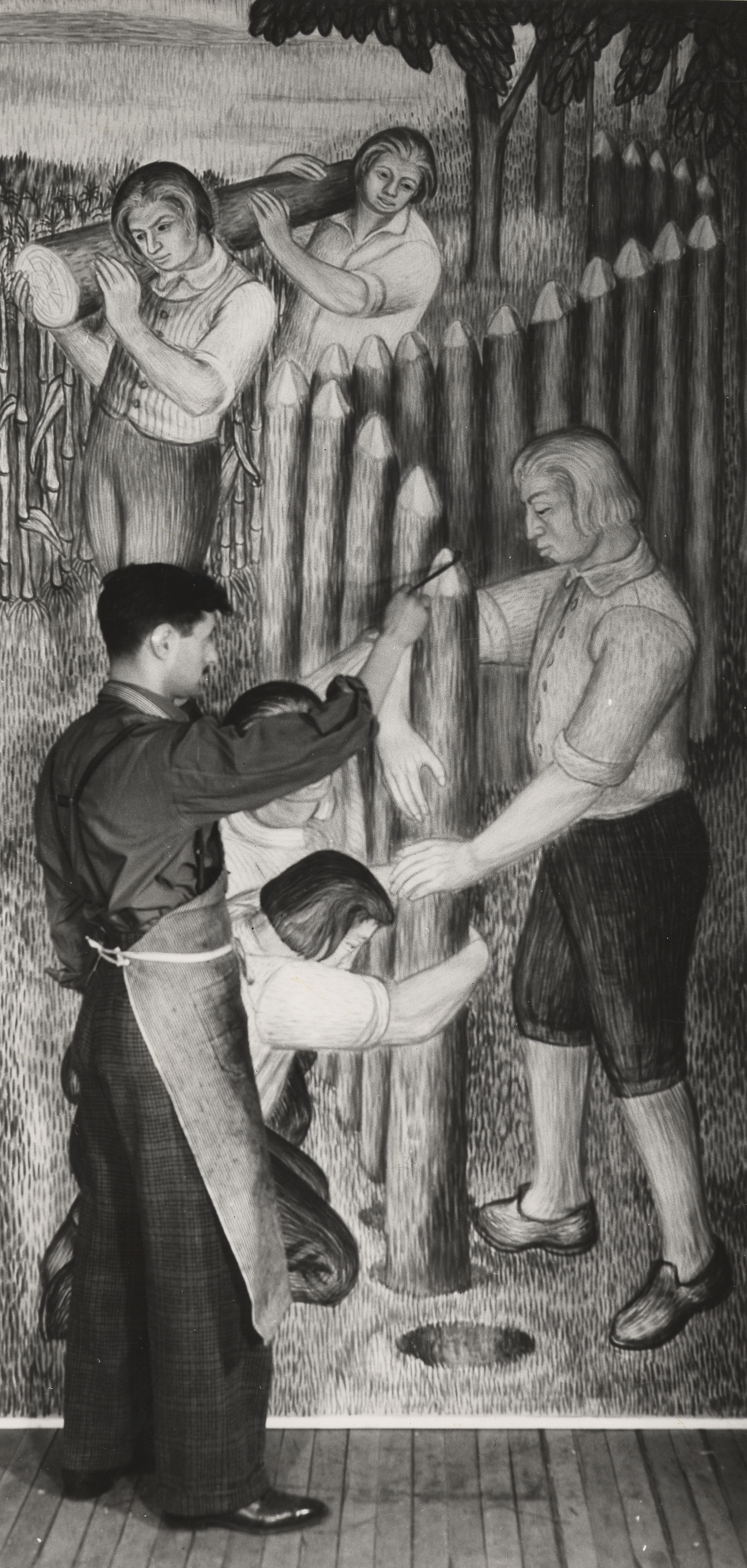
Horn painting Economic Development of America mural for the Farm Colony

Axel Horn (born January 11, 1913 – March 5, 2001) was an American artist. His name is sometimes listed as "Axel Horr" as an erroneous reading of his signature on paintings; this error is reflected in the Archives of American Art, leading to confusion over his surname.

== Life ==
He was born in New York City. He studied at the Newark School of Fine and Applied Arts in 1930, and from 1931 to 1934 at the Art Students League of New York. His instructors included Thomas Hart Benton and John Sloan; his classmates included Jackson Pollock and Will Barnet. In 1935, he was a member of the Siqueiros Mural Workshop, led by the Mexican muralist David Alfaro Siquieros.

As a member of the Federal Art Project, and he painted murals at the New York City Farm Colony and Seaview Hospital, Bellevue Hospital Center, Welfare Island Nurses Home, Whitehall, New York Post Office, and "Preparation for Lifework" in the Yellow Springs, Ohio Post Office.

From the 1940s through the mid-1960s, Horn worked in commercial display design, including stints with The Displayers (1942–1947) and Fox and Horn, NYC. In the 1960s, his concern for environmental issues led him to work on environmental and educational study programs for various colleges, agencies, foundations, and private firms, including the New York Botanical Garden, City University of New York, the National Science Foundation, Xerox, and the United Nations.

From 1966 to 1968, he worked for the Community Science Center in Ahmedabad, India, as a consultant, planner, co-administrator, and designer of environmental and educational systems. From 1970 to 1976, he was an adjunct professor of design in the Art Department at the City College of New York. From 1976 to 1982, he served as the Director of The Bronx River Restoration, a community development program in NYC. While in this position, he made a film with Larry Rosenblum titled Bronx River Restoration (Urbanimage, 1980).

From 1982 until his death, he continued to paint and write in his historic home, Shaker Hollow, in Westchester County, New York.

== Children's books ==
- Only Us! Only Us!, Little Brown & Co., 1971
- You Can Be Taller Little Brown & Co., 1974, ISBN 978-0-316-37322-7

== See also ==
- National Register of Historic Places listings in Westchester County, New York
