= Ayako Ishigaki =

- 石垣 綾子
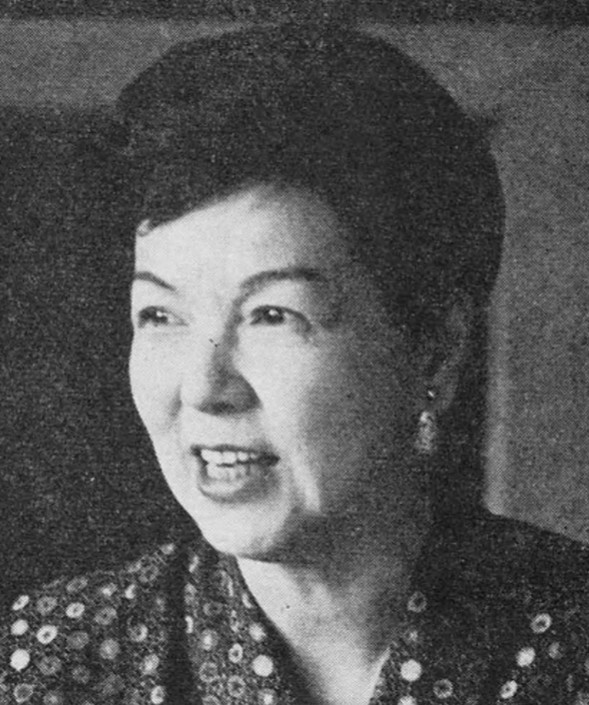
- Ayako in 1963
- Born: 1903; Tokyo
- Died: 1996 (aged 92–93)
- Spouse: Eitaro Ishigaki (married 1931–1958)

Ayako Ishigaki (石垣 綾子, Ishigaki Ayako; 1903 – 1996) was an Issei journalist, activist, and feminist, who was among the first Japanese American women to publish a memoir in English.

== Life ==
She was born Tanaka Ayako in Tokyo, Japan in 1903, the daughter of a college professor. During the 1920s, she became active in politics. While in the United States, she became friends with writers Pearl S. Buck, Helen Kuo, and Agnes Smedley and artist Yasuo Kuniyoshi.

Tanaka first came to the United States in 1926, accompanying her sister, whose husband, a diplomat, was posted to Washington, D.C. She briefly attended classes at George Washington University. Soon after, she moved to New York City, where she audited courses at Columbia University. In New York, she met the painter Eitaro Ishigaki, whom she would marry in 1931.

Following the Japanese invasion of Manchuria in 1931, Ishigaki became outspoken in protesting the Japanese military aggression in China, and reported on Japan for the left-wing magazine The New Masses. Her articles emphasized the negative impact of imperialism and industrialism on Japanese workers, particularly women. During this time, she adopted the pseudonym Haru Matsui, to protect her family in Japan from possible retaliation for her activism. In the spring of 1937, she moved to Los Angeles, where she contributed a biweekly column to the Japanese American newspaper Rafu Shimpo, writing under the pen name May Tanaka. This column focused on daily life, while incorporating feminist and antiwar commentary. She returned to New York later that year. In 1938, she went on a lecture tour with the modern dancer and left-wing militant Si-Lan Chen. During one of her lectures, she was invited to write a book by a representative of the progressive publishers Modern Age Books.

Ishigaki's memoir Restless Wave: A Life in Two Worlds, published as Haru Matsui in January 1940, and was widely reviewed in publications such as The New Yorker and The New Republic. While framed as a memoir, and generally following the arc of her life, Restless Wave also simplifies some elements of her biography, and later in life she described it as a "novelistic semi-autobiographical text." While Restless Wave gained critical and popular acclaim in the U.S., its strong critiques of Japanese society and militarism also brought Ayako negative attention from the Japanese government. The book's publication also led to a friendship between Ayako and the American author Pearl S. Buck, who reviewed Restless Wave positively and invited Ayako to contribute to Asia magazine.

After the outbreak of war between the U.S. and Japan in 1941, Ayako and Eitaro were forced to register as enemy aliens. Although they were not incarcerated due to their residence on the East Coast of the United States, they were subject to curfews and random searches, and lost their jobs. In 1942, she began working for the Office of War Information.

In the late 1940s, as the Cold War took hold and McCarthyism became dominant in the U.S., Ayako and Eitaro were placed under government surveillance due to their left-wing activism. In 1951, Eitaro was arrested and deported by the American government, and Ayako returned to Japan with him.

Following her return to Japan, Ayako continued to work extensively as a journalist, lecturer, and translator. In 1955, she published an article with the title "Shufu to iu dai-ni shokugyö-ron" ('Housewife: The Second Profession') in which she called for Japanese housewives to seek fulfillment in work beyond the home, which set off a major discussion in Japanese media, termed the 'housewife debate'. She continued to write prolifically throughout her life, eventually publishing around thirty books in Japanese and becoming a television commentator.

== Bibliography ==
- Restless Wave: My Life in Two Worlds, a Memoir, published under the pen name Haru Matsui, 1940.

== See also ==
- Japanese American Committee for Democracy
- Japanese dissidence during the Shōwa period
- Feminism in Japan
