= Thom & Wilson =

American architectural partnership

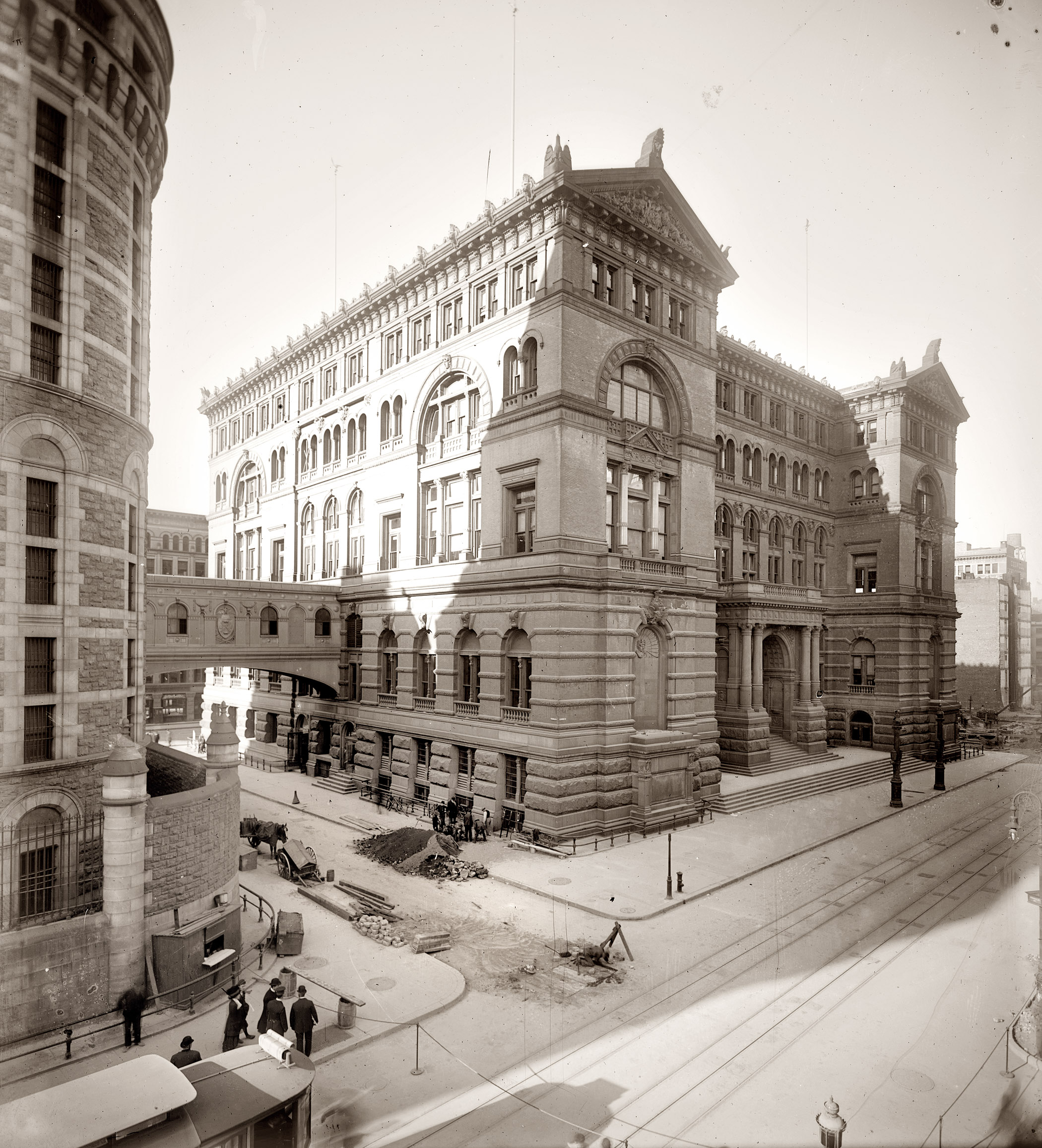
New Criminal Courts Building, 1894 (with the "Bridge of Sighs" connecting to the 1902 City Prison, near left)

Thom & Wilson, the New York City-based architectural office of Arthur M. Thom and James W. Wilson, was a partnership that turned out numerous brownstones in Romanesque Revival and Renaissance Revival styles.

The firm's most prominent commission was the 1894 Manhattan Criminal Courts (or "New Criminal Courts Building"), a grand, five-story Beaux-Arts structure with two sculpted pediments, situated on a full block between Centre, Franklin Street, Elm (now Lafayette), and White Streets in the Civic Center of Manhattan. Thom & Wilson won the commission in a competition; Napoleon LeBrun came in second. The courts building was connected with a so-called "Bridge of Sighs" to the 1902 City Prison building. Both buildings were demolished around 1939.

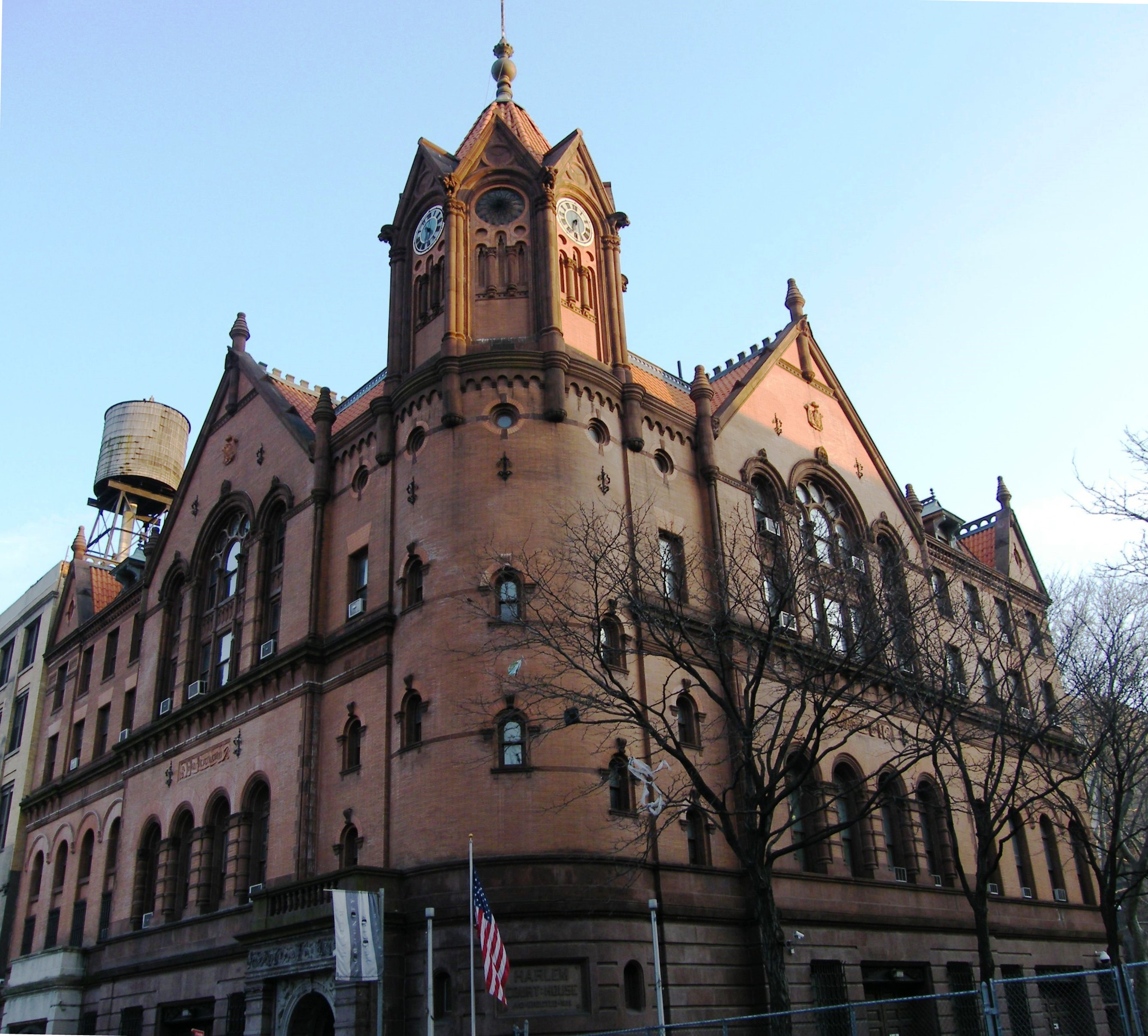
Harlem Courthouse, 1891–93

Other significant work by the firm includes their Harlem Courthouse, 170 East 121st Street (1891–93, standing) "one of the most impressive buildings in East Harlem" and The Nevada (1891, demolished) on the triangular plot bounded by Broadway, Amsterdam Avenue and 69th and 70th streets. The Nevada was built as an apartment hotel for J. T. Farley and leased out upon completion to a hotel operator. It was demolished for the present nondescript Nevada Towers, completed in 1977.

In many of their projects they were providing an architectural shell for highly standardized floorplans, for commercial entrepreneurs engaged in speculative building. They would ultimately design hundreds of developer-built brownstones on the Upper West Side. An unsigned article attributed to the contemporary critic Montgomery Schuyler considered the firm mere "architectural contractors." Yet their repertory of terra cotta details and ornaments on brown and tan brickfronts contribute to the special architectural and historic character of the Upper West Side-Central Park West Historic District.

== Commissions ==
All the following are in New York City.

- 404 West 48th Street (1884), one five-story Connecticut brown stone
- Hotel Evans, 273 West 38th Street (1885–86), a modest Italianate structure of five stories, contributing to the Garment District Historic District
- 135-143 West 72nd Street (1886–87) for the developer Robert Irwin. Numbers 137-139 survive, paired row houses with conical towers; a report in The Real Estate Record and Guide (1886) noted the "novel and striking effect" of their conjoined parlor floors.
- 9 West 82nd Street (1886)
- 48 West 85th Street (1886)
- Charles C. Stillman-John Murray Mitchell house, 9 East 67th Street (1888).
- The Hampton Apartments, 80-82 Perry Street (1887), on the site of two rowhouses, it respects the property line of its neighbors.
- 186 West 81st Street (1888) Rowhouse.
- 141 Macdougal Street, corner W. 4th Street (1889–90). Apartment block. (AIA Guide to New York City)
- 155 West 78th Street (1890). Rowhouse.
- 76-80 West 82nd Street (1890–91). Three conjoined tenement apartments, two to a floor, designed as a single block with three entrances.
- 118-126(?) West 76th Street (1890–91)
- 366 Columbus Avenue, 77th-78th Streets (1891–92)
- 52 East 80th Street, for the developer Terence Farley
- 206-226 West 79th Street (1894)
- 40-58 and 9-21 West 70th Street (1894).
