= Harlem Courthouse =

- U.S. National Register of Historic Places
- New York City Landmark
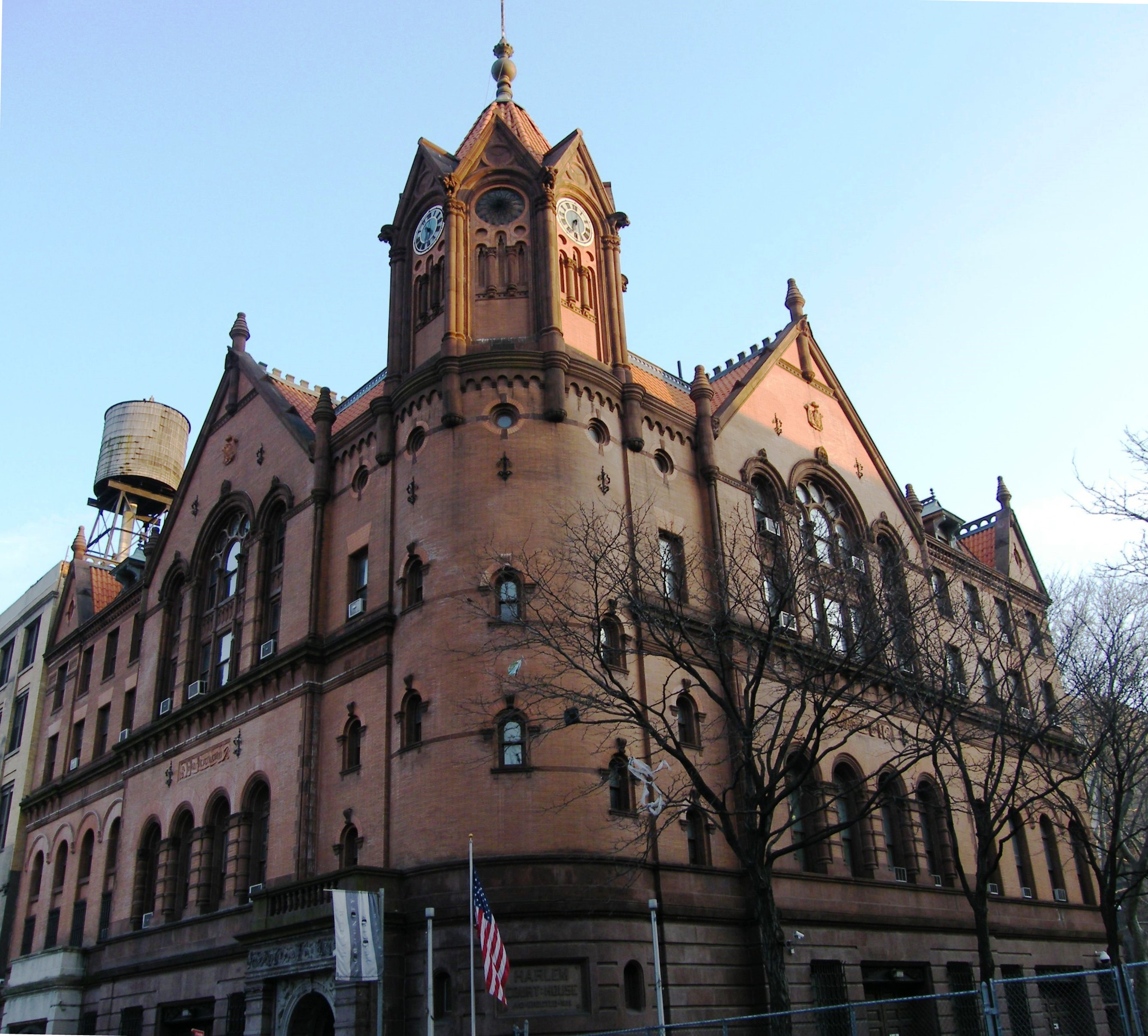
- (2009)
- Location: 170 East 121st Street; Manhattan, New York City
- Coordinates: 40°48′4.5″N 73°56′18.5″W
- Built: 1891-93
- Architect: Thom & Wilson
- Architectural style: Romanesque Revival
- NRHP reference No.: 80002692
- NYCL No.: 0297

Significant dates
- Added to NRHP: April 16, 1980
- Designated NYCL: August 2, 1967

The Harlem Courthouse at 170 East 121st Street on the corner of Sylvan Place – a remnant of the former Boston Post Road – in the Harlem neighborhood of Manhattan, New York City, was built in 1891-93 and was designed by Thom & Wilson in the Romanesque Revival style. The brick, brownstone, bluestone, granite and terra cotta building features gables, archways, an octagonal corner tower and a two-faced clock. It was built for the Police and District Courts, but is now used by other city agencies.

In 1936, during the New Deal, Federal Art Project artist David Karfunkle painted a mural, "Exploitation of Labor and Hoarding of Wealth" on its third floor.

The city government used the building as a laboratory to measure air pollution. At the time of the 1966 New York City smog, it was the city's only station to measure the air.

The building was designated a New York City landmark in 1967, and was added to the National Register of Historic Places in 1980.

== See also ==
- National Register of Historic Places listings in Manhattan above 110th Street
- List of New York City Designated Landmarks in Manhattan above 110th Street
