= Seaview Hospital =

Building complex in Staten Island, New York

- U.S. National Register of Historic Places
- U.S. Historic district
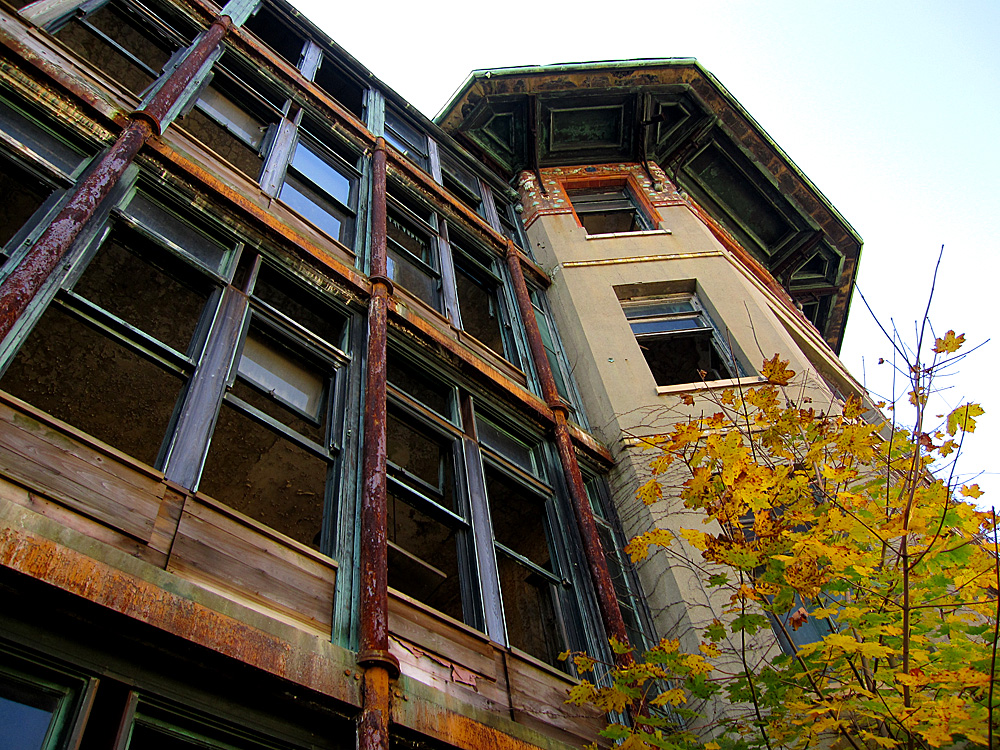
- 2009

- Location within New York City Location within New York Location within the United States
- Location: 460 Brielle Ave., Staten Island, New York
- Coordinates: 40°35′30″N 74°7′58″W
- Area: 98 acres (40 ha)
- Built: 1905
- Architect: Almirall, Raymond F.; et.al.
- Architectural style: Colonial Revival, Tudor Revival
- NRHP reference No.: 05000992
- Added to NRHP: September 7, 2005

Seaview Hospital is a historic hospital complex in Willowbrook on Staten Island, New York. The original complex was planned and built between 1905 and 1938 and was the largest and most costly municipal facility for the treatment of tuberculosis of its date in the United States. After being shuttered, the complex was listed as a national historic district.

After many years of sitting empty, portions of the complex have reopened as the Sea View Hospital Rehabilitation Center & Home, which operates as a long-term care and rehabilitation facility in the New York City Health and Hospitals Corporation network. The facility houses a nursing home, independent living facility, and the first long-term care brain injury rehabilitation center in downstate New York.

== Historic district ==
The historic district encompasses 37 contributing buildings and one contributing site. The main buildings are located along a north–south axis along Brielle Avenue and many are in the Colonial Revival or Tudor Revival style.

The north group of buildings include:

- Administration Building (1913)
- Surgical Pavilion (1913)
- Nurses Residence (1913, addition 1932) Currently an independent living senior complex, Parklane at Seaview.
- Staff House (1913)
- Power House / Laundry and Ambulance Complex (1912, addition 1935)
- Kitchen and Dining Hall Group (1912)
- Women's Pavilions (1909–1911)

Sanatorium additions include

- Auditorium or "New Dining Hall" (1917, now known as Colony Hall)
- Group Building (1917)
- Men's and Women's Open Air Pavilions (1917)

Later buildings include

- Catholic Chapel and Rectory (1928)
- City Mission Chapel or Chapel of St. Luke the Physician (1934)
- Pathology Lab (1927–1928)
- Children's Hospital (1935–1937)
- Sputum House (1911 / 1932)
- Richmond County Isolation Hospital (1928)

It was designated, with its grounds, a City Landmark in 1985 and added to the National Register of Historic Places in 2005.

== Other usage ==
In 2001 it was used as a filming location for the song "Death Blooms" by alternative metal band Mudvayne. In 2015 it was also used as a filming location for Damien Leone's Terrifier.

== See also ==
- New York City Farm Colony
- National Register of Historic Places listings in Staten Island
