= Guyer =

Guyer is a surname. Notable people with the surname include:

- Adolf Guyer-Zeller (1839–1899), Swiss entrepreneur
- Brandon Guyer (born 1986), American baseball player
- Charlie Guyer (1909–1977), Australian football player
- Cindy Guyer (born 1961), American model and actress
- Denis Guyer (born 1966), American politician
- Gino Guyer (born 1983), American ice hockey player
- Gordon Guyer (born 1926), American academic administrator from Michigan
- Irving Guyer (1916–2012), American painter
- Jane I. Guyer (born 1943), American anthropologist
- Josh Guyer (born 1994), Australian baseball player
- Léonie Guyer (born 1955), American artist
- Lisa Guyer (born 1963) American singer, guitarist, and songwriter
- Lux Guyer (1894–1955), Swiss architect
- Michael F. Guyer (1874–1959), American cytologist and zoologist
- Murphy Guyer (born 1952), American actor, playwright, writer and director
- Paul Guyer, American philosopher
- Percy Guyer, pseudonym of songwriter Septimus Winner
- Roy J. Guyer (1885–1956), American college athlete and coach
- Reyn Guyer (born 1935), American inventor of Twister
- Tennyson Guyer (1913–1981), American politician
- Thad McIntosh Guyer (born 1950), American civil rights lawyer
- U. S. Guyer (1868–1943), American politician from Kansas

== Other uses ==
- Dowleh Guyer, a village in Iran
