= Federal Art Project =

New Deal relief program to fund the visual arts

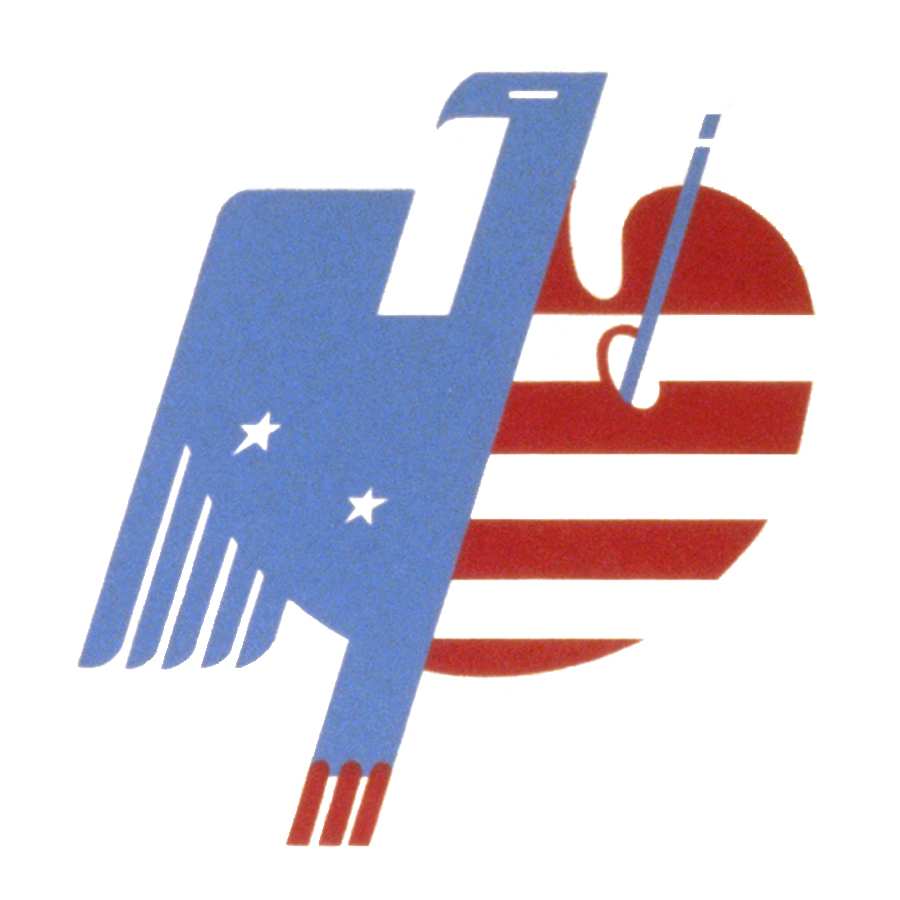
- Eagle and palette design regarded as the logo of the Federal Art Project

Agency overview
- Formed: 29 August 1935
- Dissolved: 1943
- Jurisdiction: United States
- Headquarters: Washington, D.C.
- Agency executive: Holger Cahill
- Parent department: Works Progress Administration (WPA)

The Federal Art Project (1935–1943) was a New Deal program to fund the visual arts in the United States. Under national director Holger Cahill, it was one of five Federal Project Number One projects sponsored by the Works Progress Administration (WPA), and the largest of the New Deal art projects. It was created not as a cultural activity, but as a relief measure to employ artists and artisans to create murals, easel paintings, sculpture, graphic art, posters, photography, theatre scenic design, and arts and crafts. The WPA Federal Art Project established more than 100 community art centers throughout the country, researched and documented American design, commissioned a significant body of public art without restriction to content or subject matter, and sustained some 10,000 artists and craft workers during the Great Depression. According to American Heritage, “Something like 400,000 easel paintings, murals, prints, posters, and renderings were produced by WPA artists during the eight years of the project’s existence, virtually free of government pressure to control subject matter, interpretation, or style.”

== Background ==
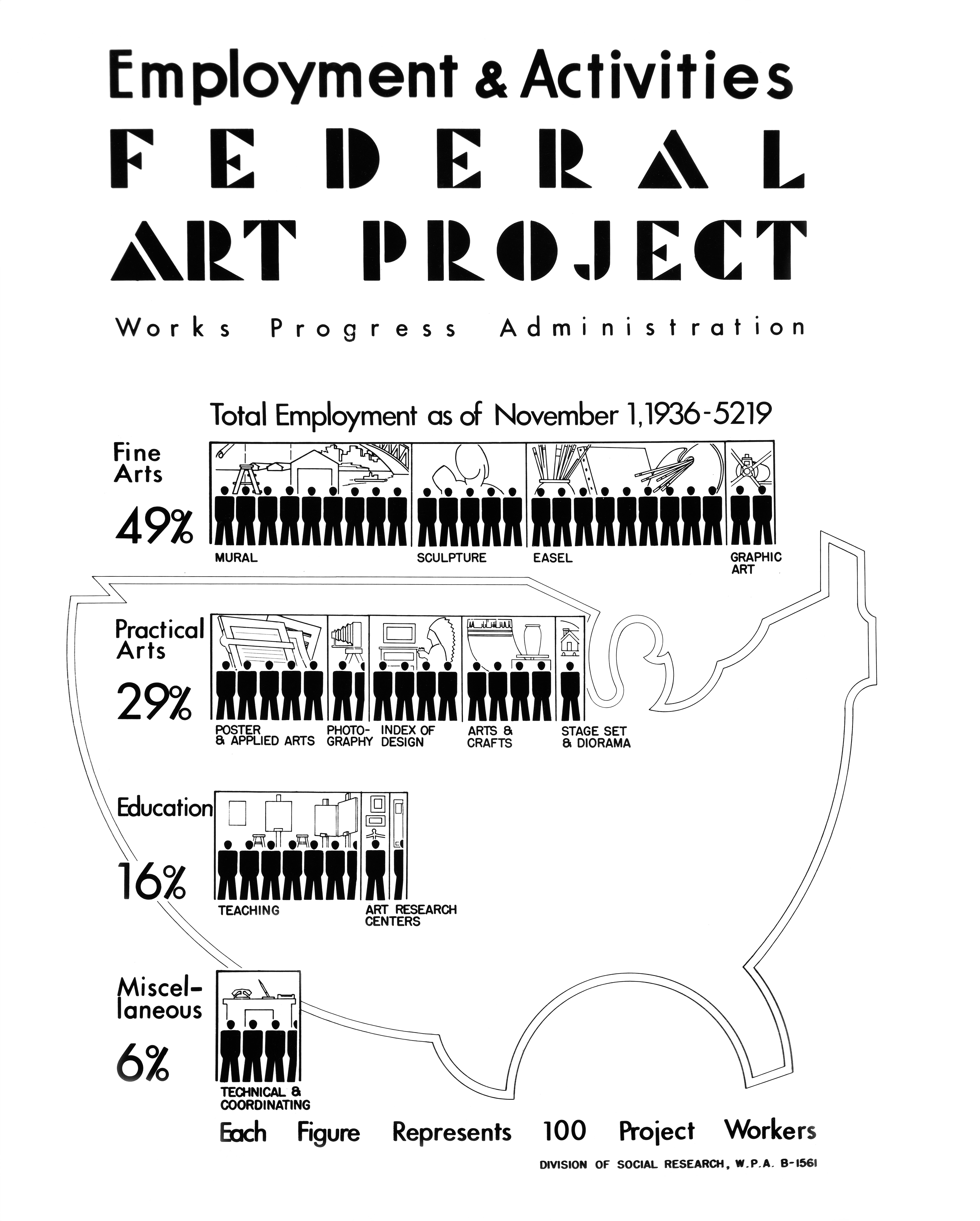
Poster summarizing Federal Art Project employment and activities (November 1, 1936)

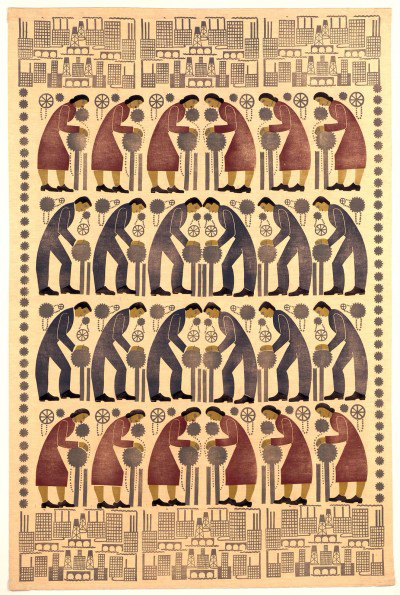
The Workers (c. 1935), a wall hanging created by Florence Kawa for the Milwaukee Handicraft Project, was presented to Eleanor Roosevelt

The Federal Art Project was the visual arts arm of Federal Project Number One, a program of the Works Progress Administration, which was intended to provide employment for struggling artists during the Great Depression. Funded under the Emergency Relief Appropriation Act of 1935, it operated from August 29, 1935, until June 30, 1943. It was created as a relief measure to employ artists and artisans to create murals, easel paintings, sculpture, graphic art, posters, photographs, Index of American Design documentation, museum and theatre scenic design, and arts and crafts. The Federal Art Project operated community art centers throughout the country where craft workers and artists worked, exhibited, and educated others. The project created more than 200,000 separate works, some of them remaining among the most significant pieces of public art in the country.

The Federal Art Project's primary goals were to employ out-of-work artists and to provide art for nonfederal municipal buildings and public spaces. Artists were paid $23.60 a week; tax-supported institutions such as schools, hospitals, and public buildings paid only for materials. The work was divided into art production, art instruction, and art research. The primary output of the art-research group was the Index of American Design, a mammoth and comprehensive study of American material culture.

As many as 10,000 artists were commissioned to produce work for the WPA Federal Art Project, the largest of the New Deal art projects. Three comparable but distinctly separate New Deal art projects were administered by the United States Department of the Treasury: the Public Works of Art Project (1933–1934), the Section of Painting and Sculpture (1934–1943), and the Treasury Relief Art Project (1935–1938).

The WPA program made no distinction between representational and nonrepresentational art. Abstraction had not yet gained favor in the 1930s and 1940s, so was virtually unsalable. As a result, the Federal Art Project supported such iconic artists as Jackson Pollock before their work could earn them income.

One particular success was the Milwaukee Handicraft Project, which started in 1935 as an experiment that employed 900 people who were classified as unemployable due to their age or disability. The project came to employ about 5,000 unskilled workers, many of them women and the long-term unemployed. Historian John Gurda observed that the city's unemployment hovered at 40% in 1933. "In that year," he said, "53 percent of Milwaukee's property taxes went unpaid because people just could not afford to make the tax payments." Workers were taught bookbinding, block printing, and design, which they used to create handmade art books and children's books. They produced toys, dolls, theatre costumes, quilts, rugs, draperies, wall hangings, and furniture that were purchased by schools, hospitals, and municipal organizations for the cost of materials only. In 2014, when the Museum of Wisconsin Art mounted an exhibition of items created by the Milwaukee Handicraft Project, furniture from it was still being used at the Milwaukee Public Library.

Holger Cahill was national director of the Federal Art Project. Other administrators included Audrey McMahon, director of the New York Region (New York, New Jersey, and Philadelphia); Clement B. Haupers, director for Minnesota; George Godfrey Thorp (Illinois), and Robert Bruce Inverarity, director for Washington. Regional New York supervisors of the Federal Art Project have included sculptor William Ehrich (1897–1960) of the Buffalo Unit (1938–1939), project director of the Buffalo Zoo expansion.

== Notable artists ==
Some 10,000 artists were commissioned to work for the Federal Art Project. Notable artists include the following:

- William Abbenseth
- Berenice Abbott
- Ida York Abelman
- Gertrude Abercrombie
- Benjamin Abramowitz
- Abe Ajay
- Ivan Albright
- Maxine Albro
- Charles Alston
- Harold Ambellan
- Luis Arenal
- Bruce Ariss
- Victor Arnautoff
- Sheva Ausubel
- Jozef Bakos
- Henry Bannarn
- Belle Baranceanu
- Patrociño Barela
- Will Barnet
- Richmond Barthé
- Herbert Bayer
- William Baziotes
- Lester Beall
- Harrison Begay
- Daisy Maud Bellis
- Rainey Bennett
- Aaron Berkman
- Leon Bibel
- Robert Blackburn
- Arnold Blanch
- Lucile Blanch
- Lucienne Bloch
- Aaron Bohrod
- Ilya Bolotowsky
- Adele Brandeis
- Louise Brann
- Edgar Britton
- Manuel Bromberg
- James Brooks
- Selma Burke
- Letterio Calapai
- Samuel Cashwan
- Giorgio Cavallon
- Daniel Celentano
- Dane Chanase
- Fay Chong
- Claude Clark
- Max Arthur Cohn
- Eldzier Cortor
- Arthur Covey
- Alfred D. Crimi
- Francis Criss
- Allan Crite
- Robert Cronbach
- John Steuart Curry
- Philip Campbell Curtis
- James Daugherty
- Stuart Davis
- Adolf Dehn
- Willem de Kooning
- Joseph De Martini
- Burgoyne Diller
- Isami Doi
- Mabel Dwight
- Ruth Egri
- Fritz Eichenberg
- Jacob Elshin
- George Pearse Ennis
- Angna Enters
- Philip Evergood
- Louis Ferstadt
- Alexander Finta
- Joseph Fleck
- Seymour Fogel
- Lily Furedi
- George Michael Gaethke
- Todros Geller
- Aaron Gelman
- Eugenie Gershoy
- Enrico Glicenstein
- Vincent Glinsky
- Bertram Goodman
- Arshile Gorky
- Harry Gottlieb
- Blanche Grambs
- Morris Graves
- Balcomb Greene
- Marion Greenwood
- Waylande Gregory
- Philip Guston
- Irving Guyer
- Abraham Harriton
- Marsden Hartley
- Knute Heldner
- August Henkel
- Ralf Henricksen
- Magnus Colcord Heurlin
- Hilaire Hiler
- Louis Hirshman
- Donal Hord
- Axel Horn
- Milton Horn
- Allan Houser
- Eitaro Ishigaki
- Edwin Boyd Johnson
- Sargent Claude Johnson
- Tom Loftin Johnson
- William H. Johnson
- Leonard D. Jungwirth
- Reuben Kadish
- Sheffield Kagy
- Jacob Kainen
- David Karfunkle
- Leon Kelly
- Paul Kelpe
- Troy Kinney
- Georgina Klitgaard
- Gene Kloss
- Karl Knaths
- Edwin B. Knutesen
- Lee Krasner
- Kalman Kubinyi
- Yasuo Kuniyoshi
- Jacob Lawrence
- Edward Laning
- Michael Lantz
- Blanche Lazzell
- Tom Lea
- Lawrence Lebduska
- Joseph Leboit
- William Robinson Leigh
- Julian E. Levi
- Jack Levine
- Monty Lewis
- Elba Lightfoot
- Abraham Lishinsky
- Michael Loew
- Thomas Gaetano LoMedico
- Louis Lozowick
- Nan Lurie
- Guy Maccoy
- Stanton Macdonald-Wright
- George McNeil
- Moissaye Marans
- David Margolis
- Kyra Markham
- Jack Markow
- Mercedes Matter
- Jan Matulka
- Dina Melicov
- Hugh Mesibov
- Katherine Milhous
- Jo Mora
- Helmuth Naumer
- Louise Nevelson
- James Michael Newell
- Spencer Baird Nichols
- Elizabeth Olds
- John Opper
- William C. Palmer
- Phillip Pavia
- Irene Rice Pereira
- Jackson Pollock
- George Post
- Gregorio Prestopino
- Mac Raboy
- Anton Refregier
- Ad Reinhardt
- Misha Reznikoff
- Mischa Richter
- Diego Rivera
- José de Rivera
- Emanuel Glicen Romano
- Mark Rothko
- Alexander Rummler
- Augusta Savage
- Concetta Scaravaglione
- Louis Schanker
- Edwin Scheier
- Mary Scheier
- Carl Schmitt
- William S. Schwartz
- Georgette Seabrooke
- Ben Shahn
- Henrietta Shore
- William Howard Shuster
- Mitchell Siporin
- John French Sloan
- Joseph Solman
- William Sommer
- Isaac Soyer
- Moses Soyer
- Raphael Soyer
- Ralph Stackpole
- Cesare Stea
- Walter Steinhart
- Joseph Stella
- Harry Sternberg
- Sakari Suzuki
- Albert Swinden
- Rufino Tamayo
- Elizabeth Terrell
- Lenore Thomas
- Dox Thrash
- Mark Tobey
- Harry Everett Townsend
- Edward Buk Ulreich
- Charles Umlauf
- Jacques Van Aalten
- Stuyvesant Van Veen
- Herman Volz
- Mark Voris
- John Augustus Walker
- Andrew Winter
- Jean Xceron
- Edgar Yaeger
- Bernard Zakheim
- Karl Zerbe

== Community Art Center program ==
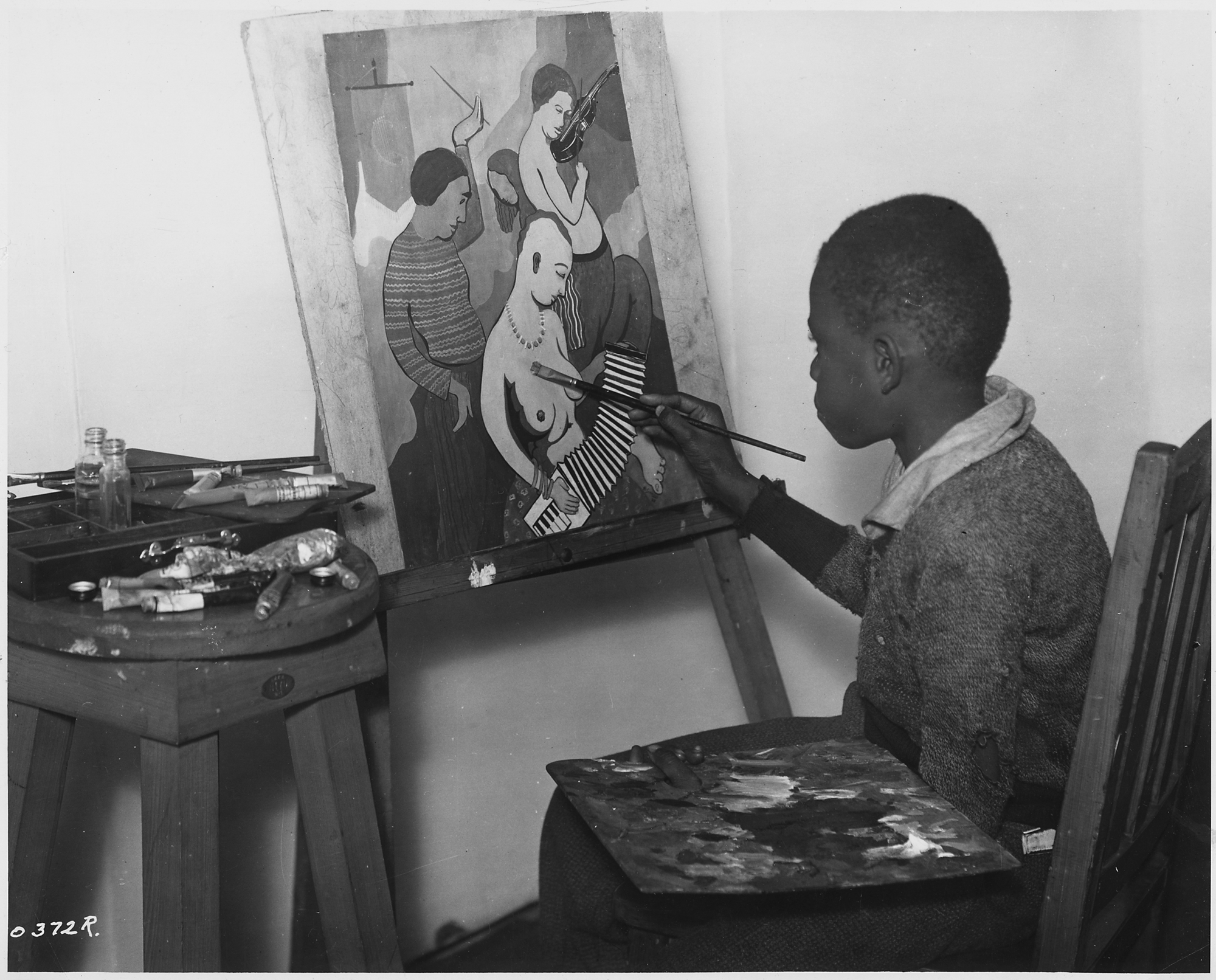
Jacksonville Negro Art Center, Jacksonville, Florida

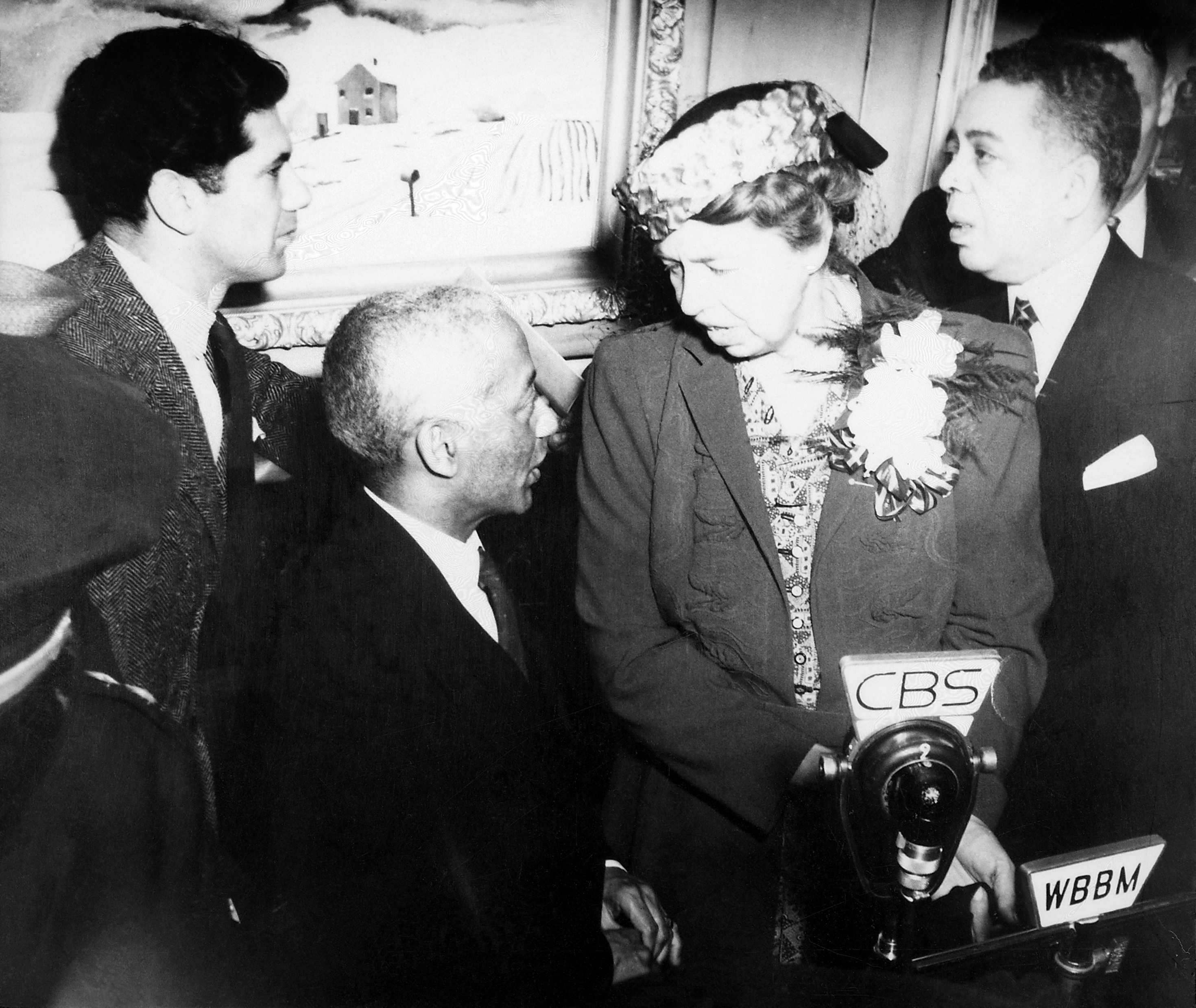
Eleanor Roosevelt at the dedication of the South Side Community Art Center, Chicago, Illinois (May 7, 1941)

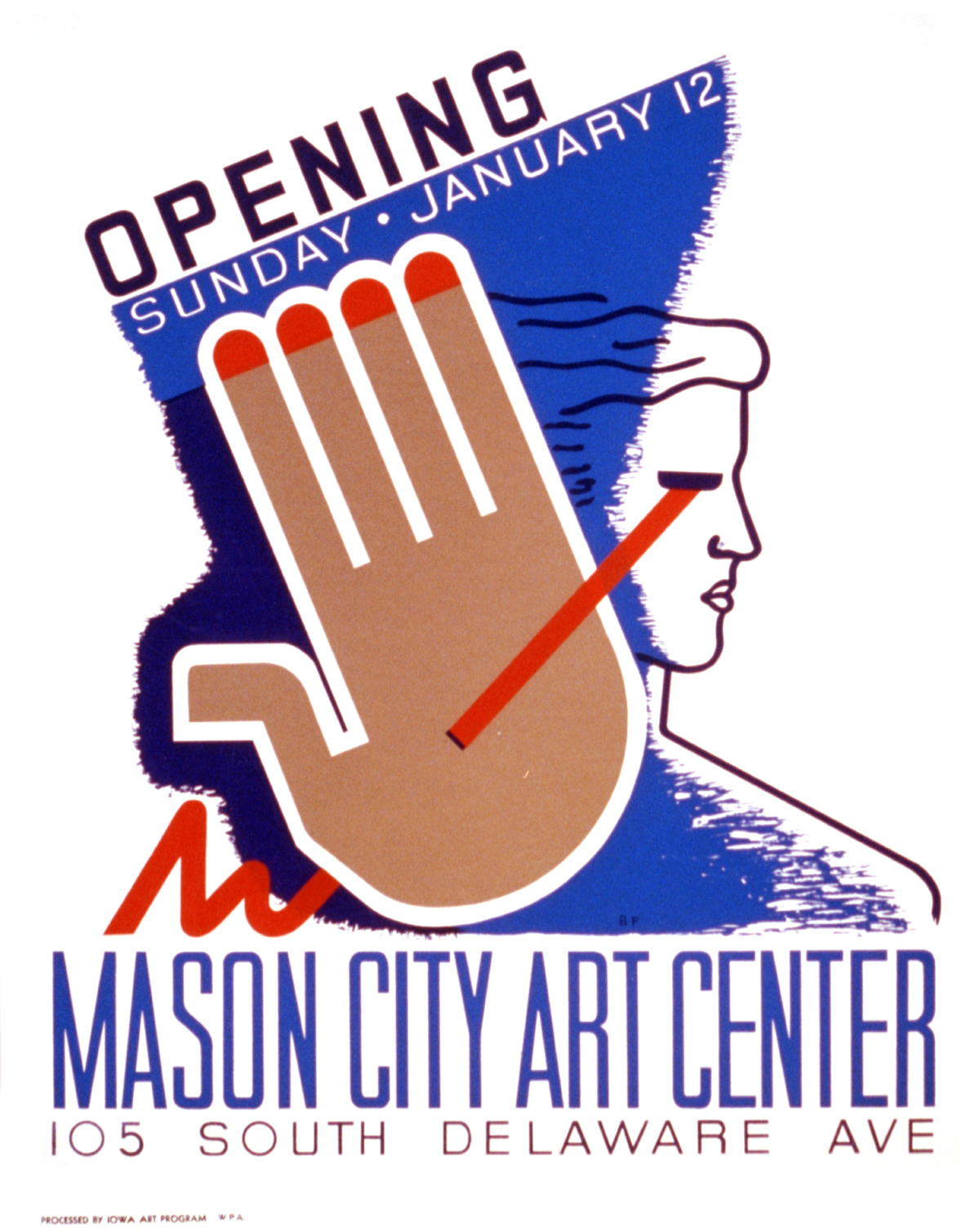
Poster for the opening of the Mason City Art Center, Mason City, Iowa (1941)

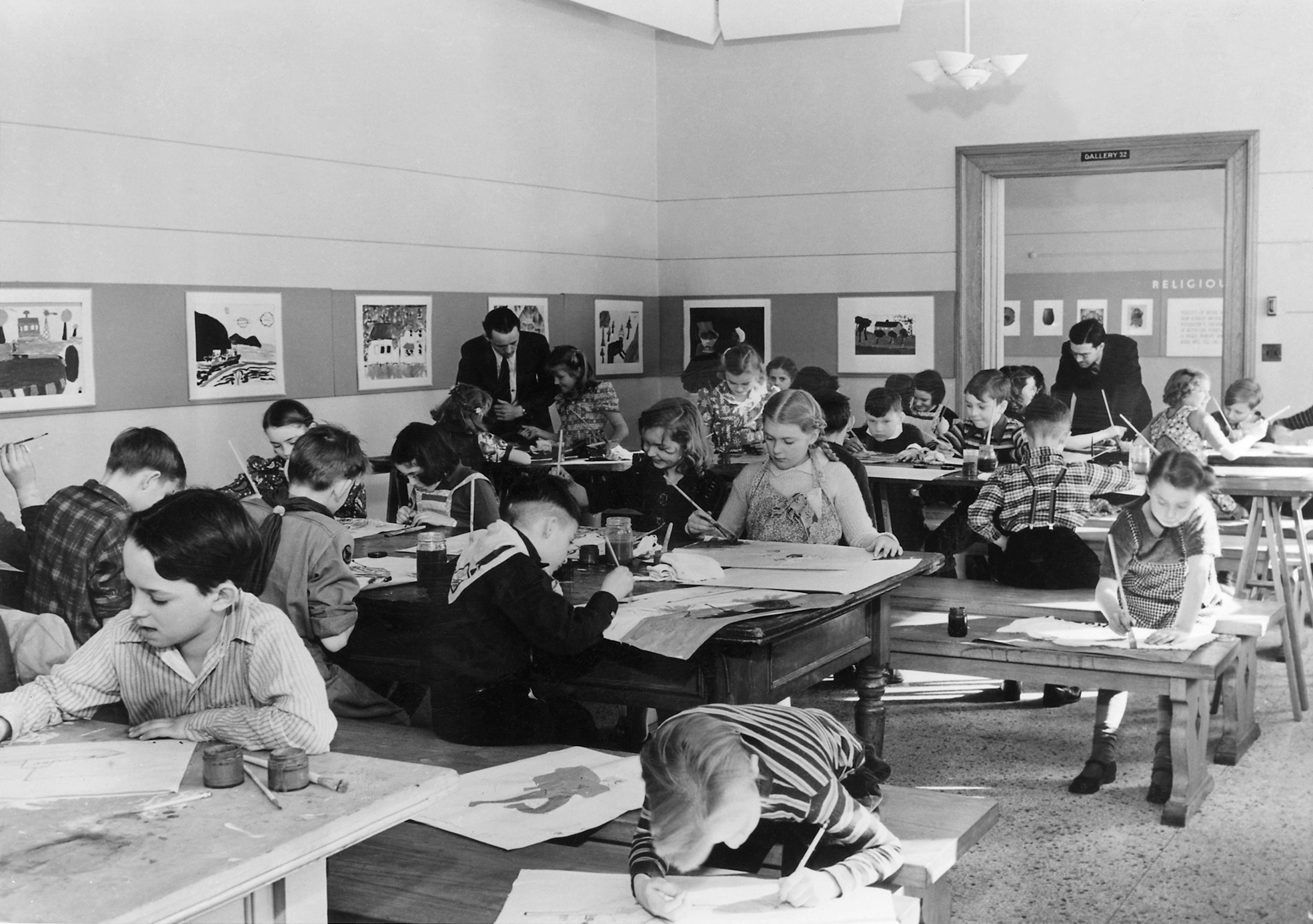
Children's art class at the Walker Art Center, Minneapolis, Minnesota

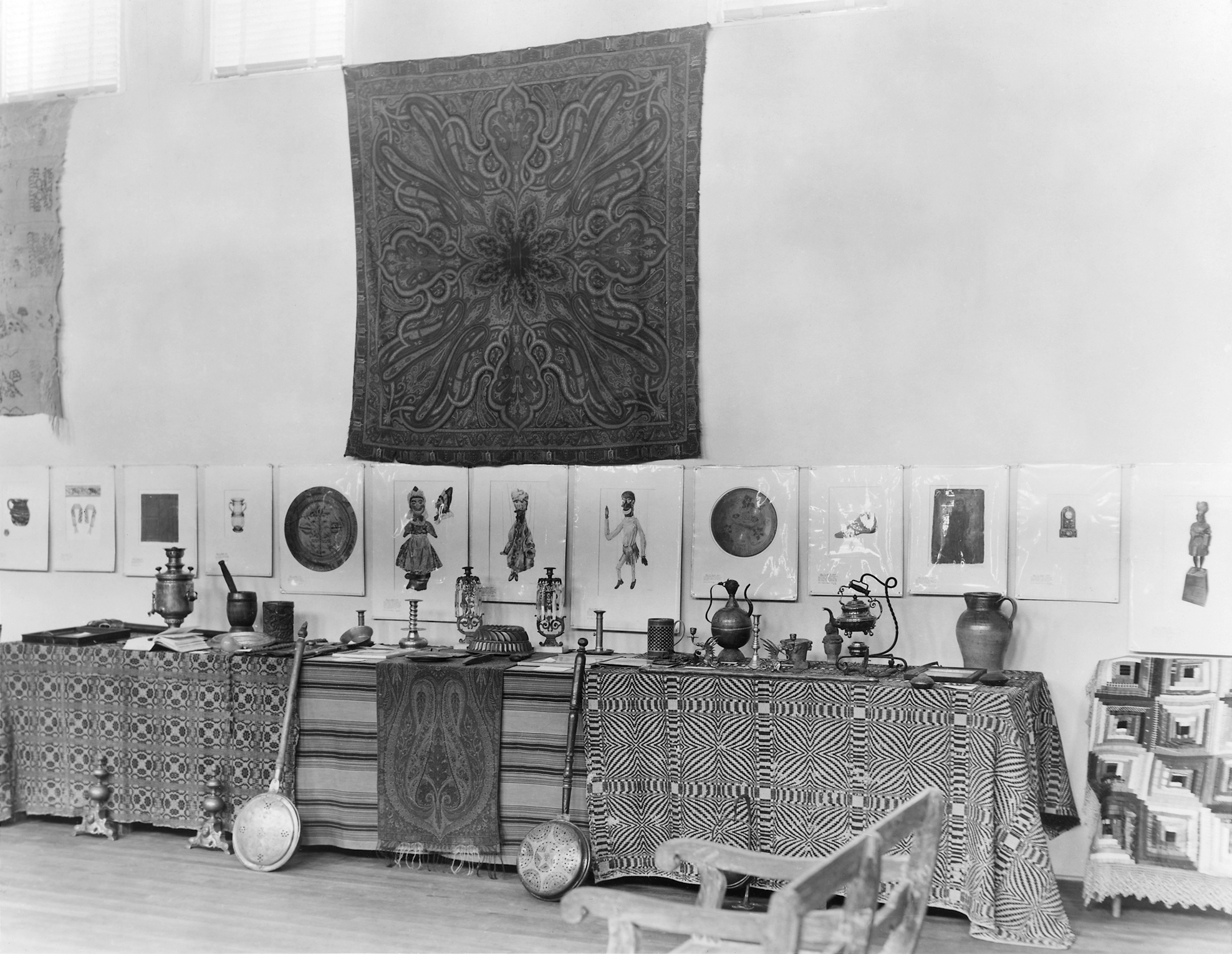
American design exhibit at the Roswell Museum and Art Center, Roswell, New Mexico (1941)

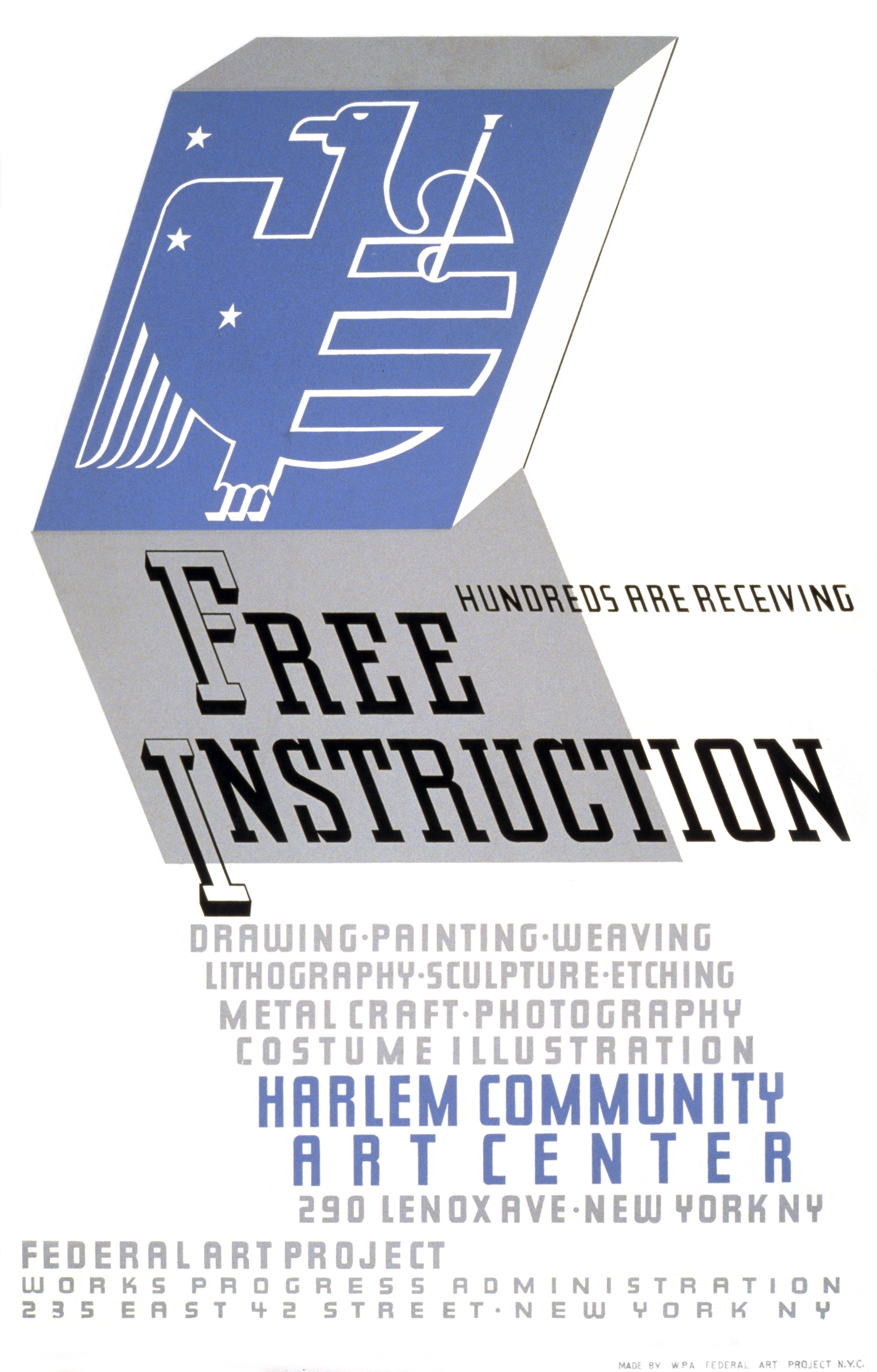
Poster for the Harlem Community Art Center, New York City (1938)

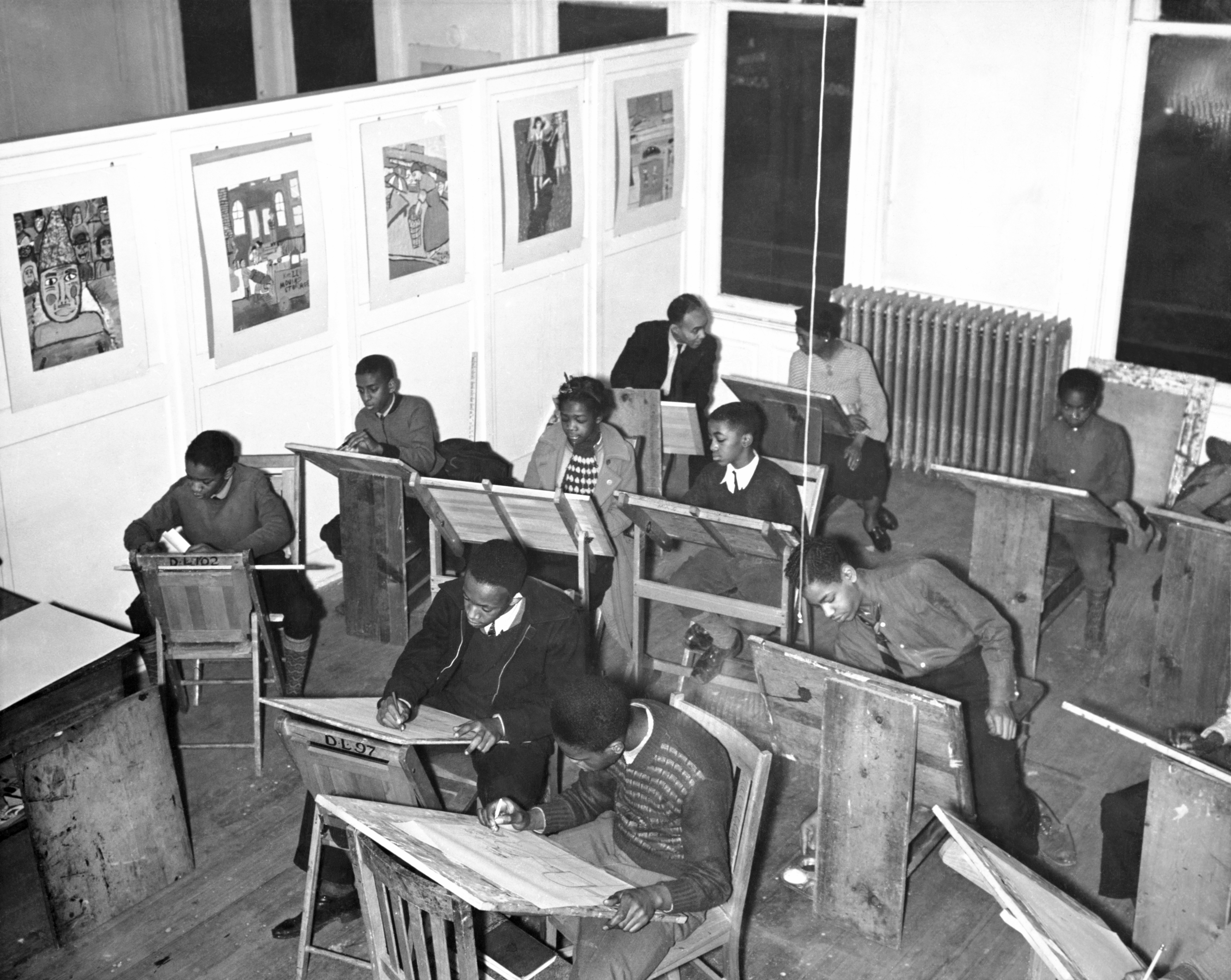
Class at the Harlem Community Art Center (January 1, 1938)

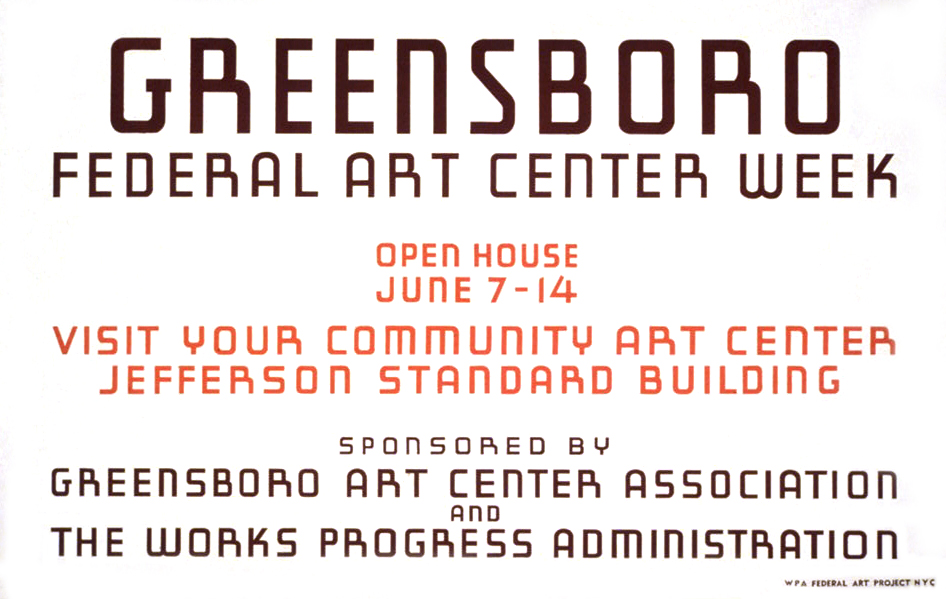
Poster for the open house of the Greensboro Art Center, Greensboro, North Carolina (1937)

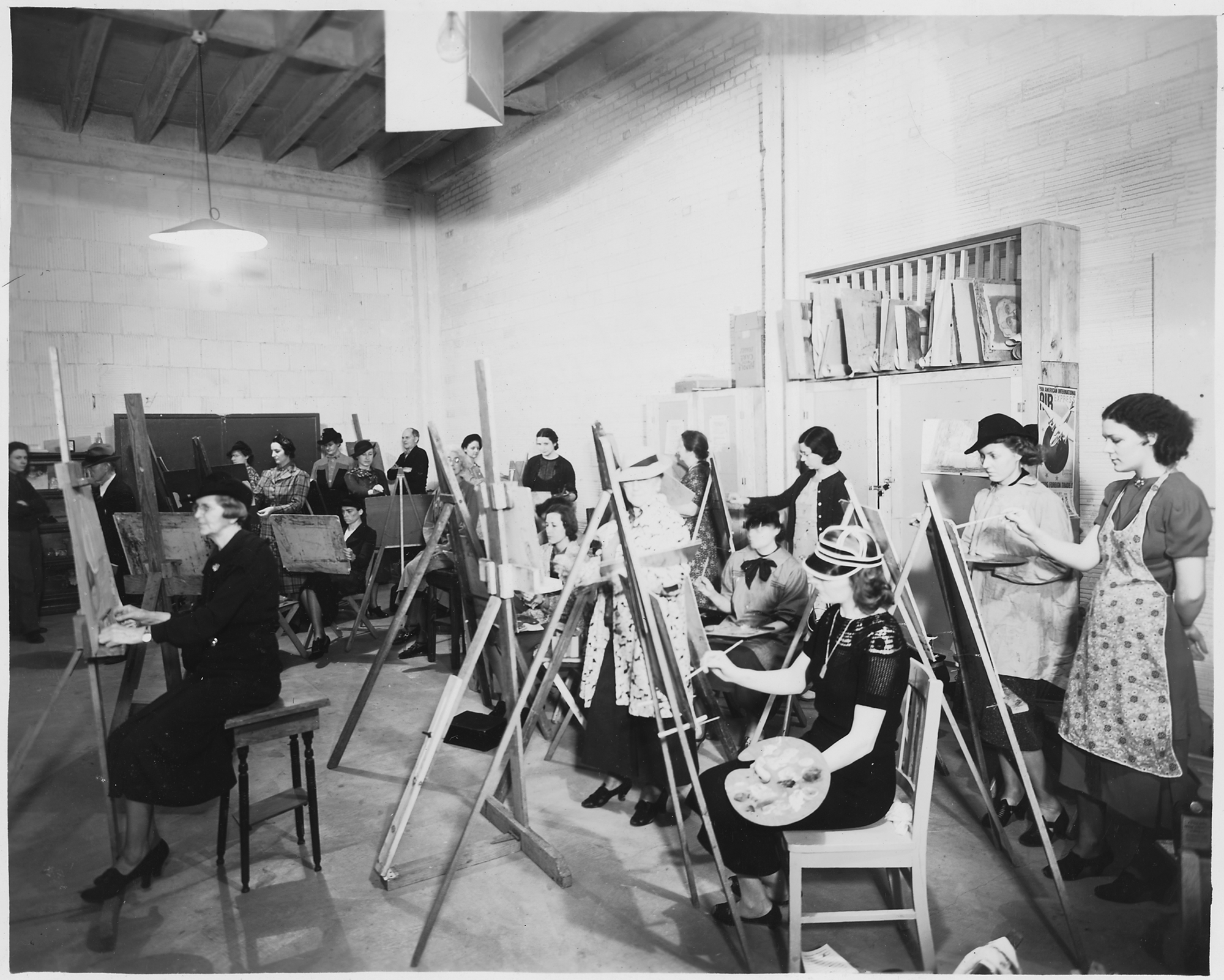
Oklahoma Art Center, Oklahoma City, Oklahoma

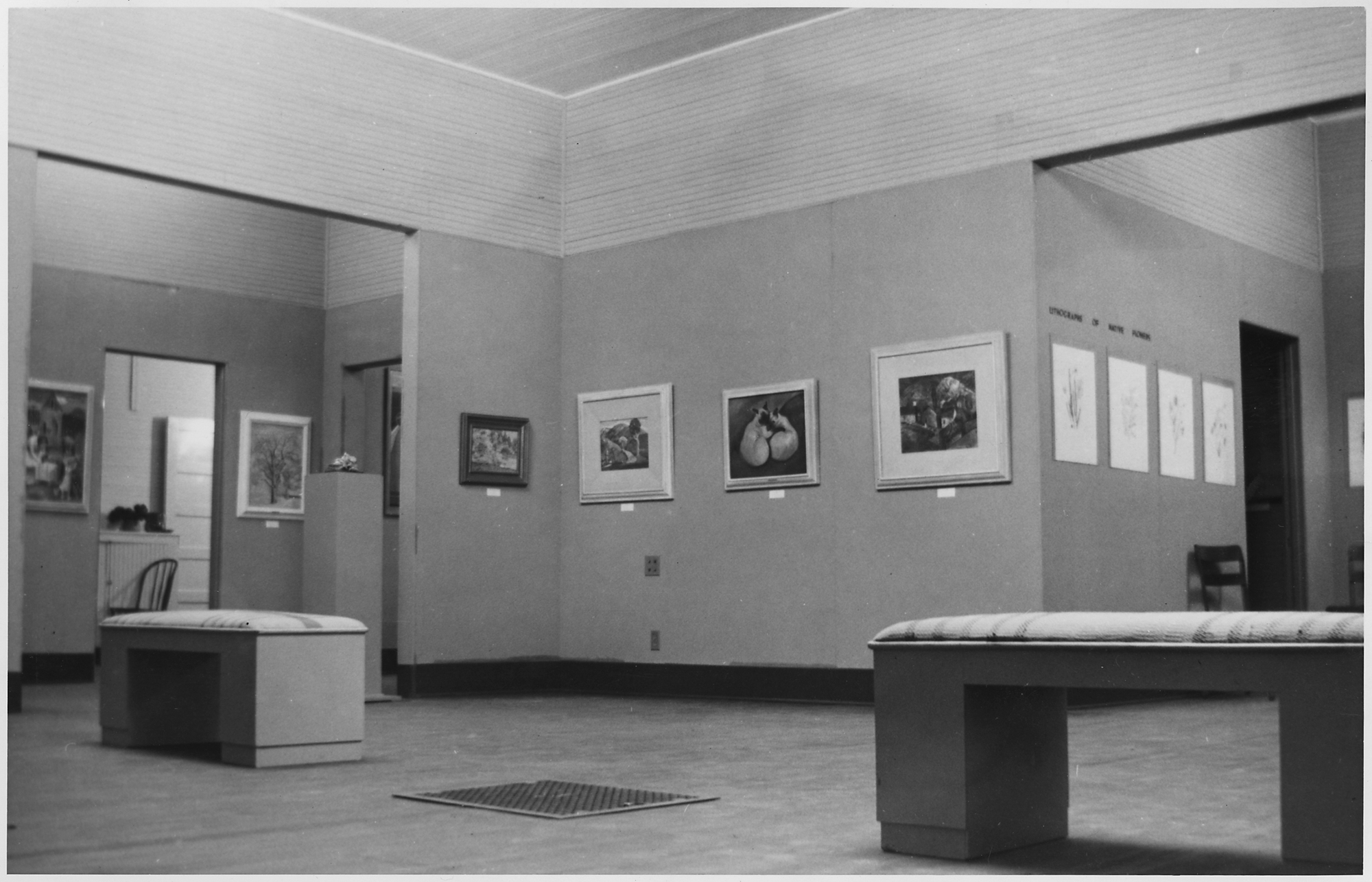
Curry County Art Center, Gold Beach, Oregon

The first federally sponsored community art center opened in December 1936 in Raleigh, North Carolina.

State	City	Name	Notes
Alabama	Birmingham		Extension art gallery
Alabama	Birmingham	Healey School Art Gallery	
Alabama	Mobile	Mobile Art Center, Public Library Building	
Arizona	Phoenix	Phoenix Art Center	
District of Columbia	Washington, D.C.	Children's Art Gallery	
Florida	Bradenton	Bradenton Art Center	
Florida	Coral Gables	Coral Gables Art Gallery	Extension art gallery
Florida	Daytona Beach	Daytona Beach Art Center	
Florida	Jacksonville	Jacksonville Art Center	
Florida	Jacksonville	Jacksonville Beach Art Gallery	Extension art gallery
Florida	Jacksonville	Jacksonville Negro Art Center	Extension art gallery
Florida	Key West	Key West Community Art Center	
Florida	Miami	Miami Art Center	
Florida	Milton	Milton Art Gallery	Extension art gallery
Florida	New Smyrna Beach	New Smyrna Beach Art Center	
Florida	Ocala	Ocala Art Center	
Florida	Pensacola	Pensacola Art Center	
Florida	St. Petersburg	Jordan Park Negro Exhibition Center	
Florida	St. Petersburg	St. Petersburg Art Center	
Florida	St. Petersburg	St. Petersburg Civic Exhibition Center	
Florida	Tampa	Tampa Art Center	
Florida	Tampa	West Tampa Negro Art Gallery	
Illinois	Chicago	Hyde Park Art Center	
Illinois	Chicago	South Side Community Art Center	
Iowa	Mason City	Mason City Art Center	
Iowa	Ottumwa	Ottumwa Art Center	
Iowa	Sioux City	Sioux City Art Center	
Kansas	Topeka	Topeka Art Center	
Minnesota	Minneapolis	Walker Art Center	
Mississippi	Greenville	Delta Art Center	
Mississippi	Oxford	Oxford Art Center	
Mississippi	Sunflower	Sunflower County Art Center	
Missouri	St. Louis	The People's Art Center	
Montana	Butte	Butte Art Center	
Montana	Great Falls	Great Falls Art Center	
New Mexico	Gallup	Gallup Art Center	
New Mexico	Melrose	Melrose Art Center	
New Mexico	Roswell	Roswell Museum and Art Center	
New York City	Brooklyn	Brooklyn Community Art Center	
New York City	Manhattan	Contemporary Art Center	
New York City	Harlem	Harlem Community Art Center	
New York City	Flushing, Queens	Queensboro Community Art Center	
North Carolina	Cary	Cary Gallery	Extension art gallery
North Carolina	Greensboro	Greensboro Art Center	
North Carolina	Greenville	Greenville Art Gallery	
North Carolina	Raleigh	Crosby-Garfield School	Extension art gallery
North Carolina	Raleigh	Needham B. Broughton High School	Extension art gallery
North Carolina	Raleigh	Raleigh Art Center	
North Carolina	Wilmington	Wilmington Art Center	
Oklahoma	Bristow	Bristow Art Gallery	Extension art gallery
Oklahoma	Claremore	Claremore Art Gallery	Extension art gallery
Oklahoma	Claremore	Will Rogers Public Library	Extension art gallery
Oklahoma	Clinton	Clinton Art Gallery	Extension art gallery
Oklahoma	Cushing	Cushing Art Gallery	Extension art gallery
Oklahoma	Edmond	Edmond Art Gallery	Extension art gallery
Oklahoma	Marlow	Marlow Art Gallery	Extension art gallery
Oklahoma	Oklahoma City	Oklahoma Art Center	
Oklahoma	Okmulgee	Okmulgee Art Center	Extension art gallery
Oklahoma	Sapulpa	Sapulpa Art Gallery	Extension art gallery
Oklahoma	Shawnee	Shawnee Art Gallery	Extension art gallery
Oklahoma	Skiatook	Skiatook Art Gallery	Extension art gallery
Oregon	Gold Beach	Curry County Art Center	
Oregon	La Grande	Grande Ronde Valley Art Center	
Oregon	Salem	Salem Art Center	
Pennsylvania	Somerset	Somerset Art Center	
Tennessee	Chattanooga	Hamilton County Art Center	
Tennessee	Memphis	LeMoyne Art Center	
Tennessee	Nashville	Peabody Art Center	
Tennessee	Norris	Anderson County Art Center	
Utah	Cedar City	Cedar City Art Exhibition Association	Extension art gallery
Utah	Helper	Helper Community Gallery	Extension art gallery
Utah	Price	Price Community Gallery	Extension art gallery
Utah	Provo	Provo Community Gallery	Extension art gallery
Utah	Salt Lake City	Utah State Art Center	
Virginia	Altavista	Altavista Extension Gallery	Extension art gallery
Virginia	Big Stone Gap	Big Stone Gap Art Gallery	
Virginia	Lynchburg	Lynchburg Art Gallery	
Virginia	Richmond	Children's Art Gallery	
Virginia	Saluda	Middlesex County Museum	Extension art gallery
Washington	Chehalis	Lewis County Exhibition Center	Extension art gallery
Washington	Pullman	Washington State College	Extension art gallery
Washington	Spokane	Spokane Art Center	
West Virginia	Morgantown	Morgantown Art Center	
West Virginia	Parkersburg	Parkersburg Art Center	
West Virginia	Scotts Run	Scotts Run Art Gallery	Extension art gallery
Wyoming	Casper	Casper Art Gallery	Extension art gallery
Wyoming	Lander	Lander Art Gallery	Extension art gallery
Wyoming	Laramie	Laramie Art Center	
Wyoming	Newcastle	Lander Art Gallery	Extension art gallery
Wyoming	Rawlins	Rawlins Art Gallery	Extension art gallery
Wyoming	Riverton	Riverton Art Gallery	Extension art gallery
Wyoming	Rock Springs	Rock Springs Art Gallery	Extension art gallery
Wyoming	Sheridan	Sheridan Art Gallery	Extension art gallery
Wyoming	Torrington	Torrington Art Gallery	Extension art gallery

== Index of American Design ==
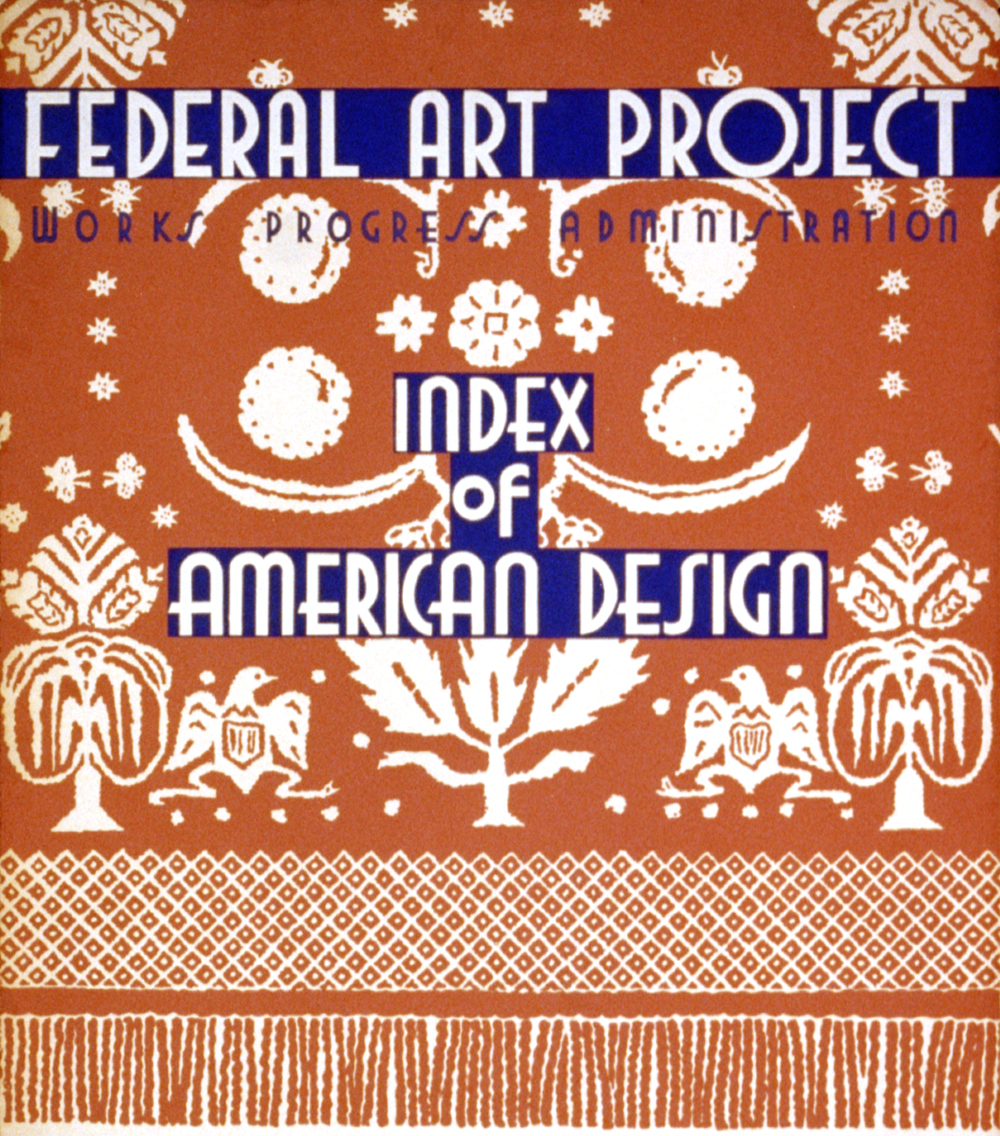
Federal Art Project Illinois poster for an exhibition of the Index of American Design

Carl Buergerniss, Stereoscope (1940)

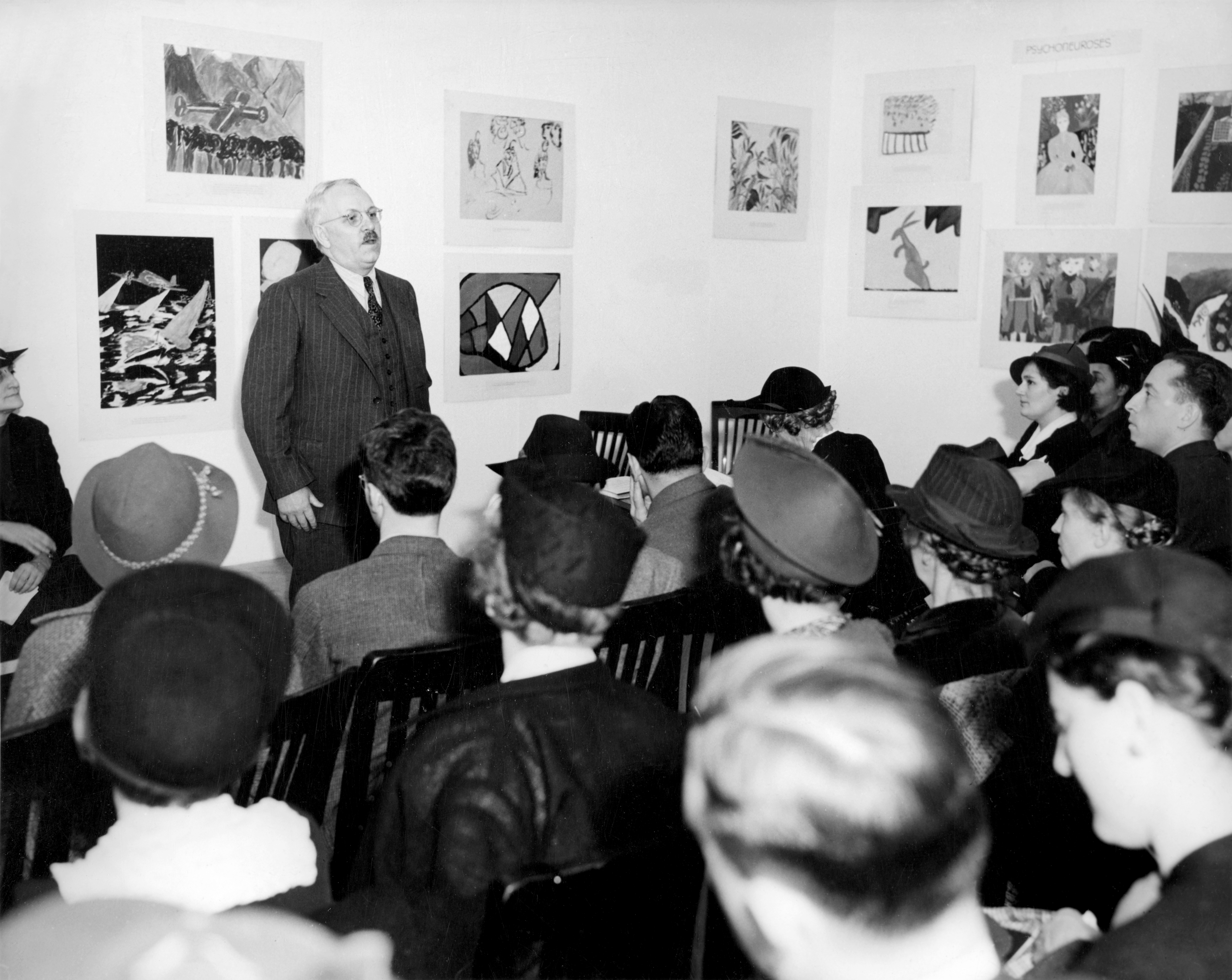
Holger Cahill, national director of the Federal Art Project, speaking at the Harlem Community Art Center (October 24, 1938)

As we study the drawings of the Index of American Design we realize that the hands that made the first two hundred years of this country's material culture expressed something more than untutored creative instinct and the rude vigor of a frontier civilization. … The Index, in bringing together thousands of particulars from various sections of the country, tells the story of American hand skills and traces intelligible patterns within that story.

— Holger Cahill, national director of the Federal Art Project

The Index of American Design program of the Federal Art Project produced a pictorial survey of the crafts and decorative arts of the United States from the early colonial period to 1900. Artists working for the Index produced nearly 18,000 meticulously faithful watercolor drawings, documenting material culture by largely anonymous artisans. Objects surveyed ranged from furniture, silver, glass, stoneware and textiles to tavern signs, ships's figureheads, cigar-store figures, carousel horses, toys, tools and weather vanes. Photography was used only to a limited degree since artists could more accurately and effectively present the form, character, color and texture of the objects. The best drawings approach the work of such 19th-century trompe-l'œil painters as William Harnett; lesser works represent the process of artists who were given employment and expert training.

"It was not a nostalgic or antiquarian enterprise," wrote historian Roger G. Kennedy. "It was initiated by modernists dedicated to abstract design, hoping to influence industrial design — thus in many ways it parallelled the founding philosophy of the Museum of Modern Art in New York."

Like all WPA programs, the Index had the primary purpose of providing employment. Its function was to identify and record material of historical significance that had not been studied and was in danger of being lost. Its aim was to gather together these pictorial records into a body of material that would form the basis for organic development of American design — a usable American past accessible to artists, designers, manufacturers, museums, libraries and schools. The United States had no single comprehensive collection of authenticated historical native design comparable to those available to scholars, artists and industrial designers in Europe.

"In one sense the Index is a kind of archaeology," wrote Holger Cahill. "It helps to correct a bias which has tended to relegate the work of the craftsman and the folk artist to the subconscious of our history where it can be recovered only by digging. In the past we have lost whole sequences out of their story, and have all but forgotten the unique contribution of hand skills in our culture."

The Index of American Design operated in 34 states and the District of Columbia from 1935 to 1942. It was founded by Romana Javitz, head of the Picture Collection of the New York Public Library, and textile designer Ruth Reeves. Reeves was appointed the first national coordinator; she was succeeded by C. Adolph Glassgold (1936) and Benjamin Knotts (1940). Constance Rourke was national editor. The work is in the collection of the National Gallery of Art in Washington, D.C.

The Index employed an average of 300 artists during its six years in operation. One artist was Magnus S. Fossum, a longtime farmer who was compelled by the Depression to move from the Midwest to Florida. After he lost his left hand in an accident in 1934, he produced watercolor renderings for the Index, using magnifiers and drafting instruments for accuracy and precision. Fossum eventually received an insurance settlement that made it possible for him to buy another farm and leave the Federal Art Project.

In her essay,'Picturing a Usable Past,' Virginia Tuttle Clayton, curator of the 2002–2003 exhibition, Drawing on America's Past: Folk Art, Modernism, and the Index of American Design, held at the National Gallery of Art noted that "the Index of American Design was the result of an ambitious and creative effort to furnish for the visual arts a usable past."

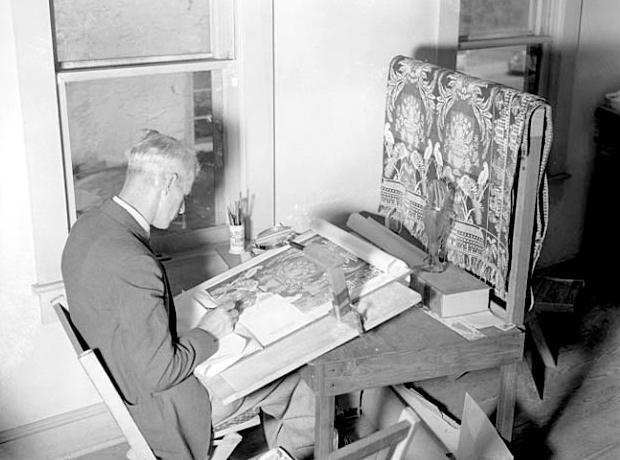
Magnus Fossum at work on Boston Town Coverlet (February 1940)

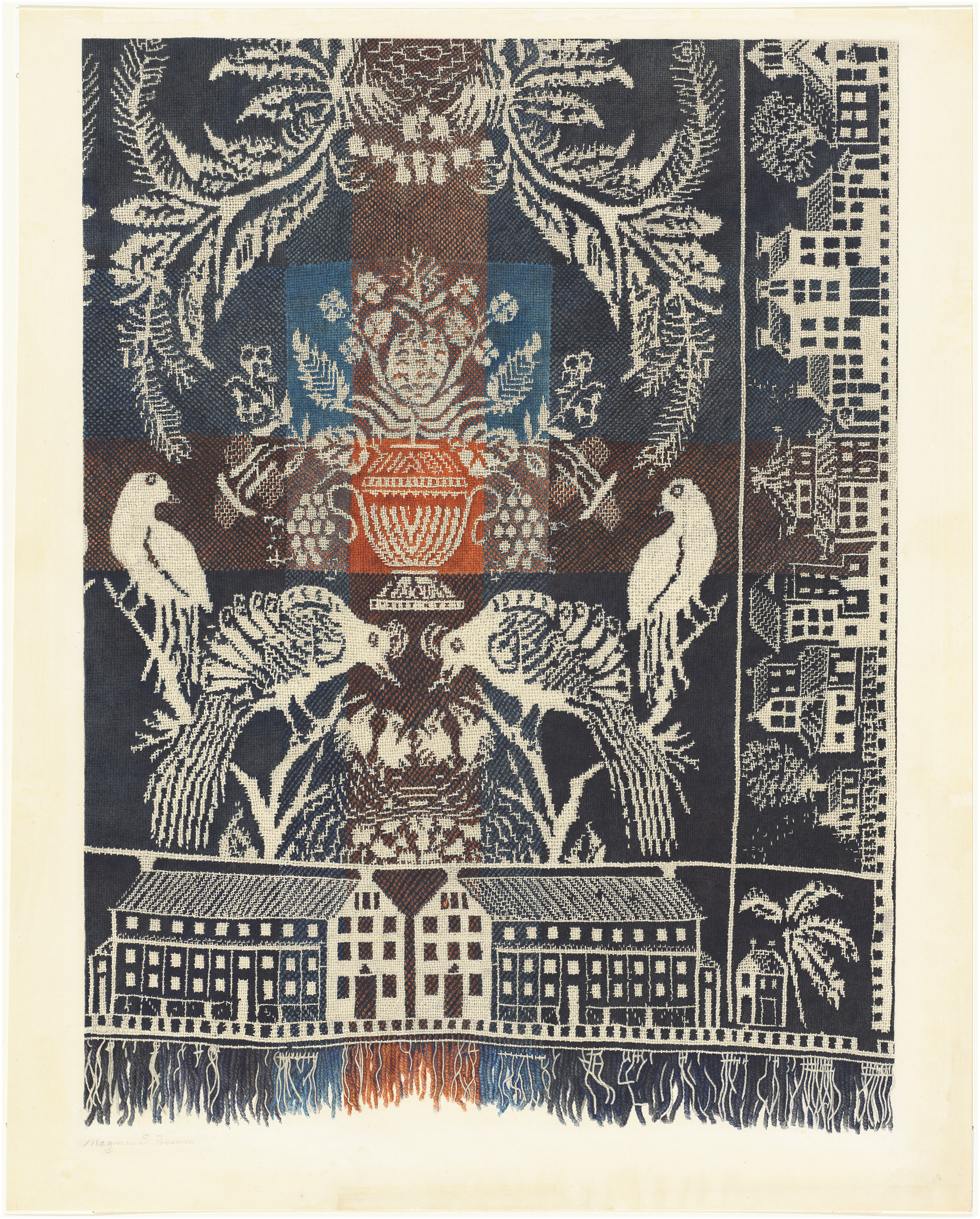
Boston Town Coverlet
Magnus Fossum (1935–1942)

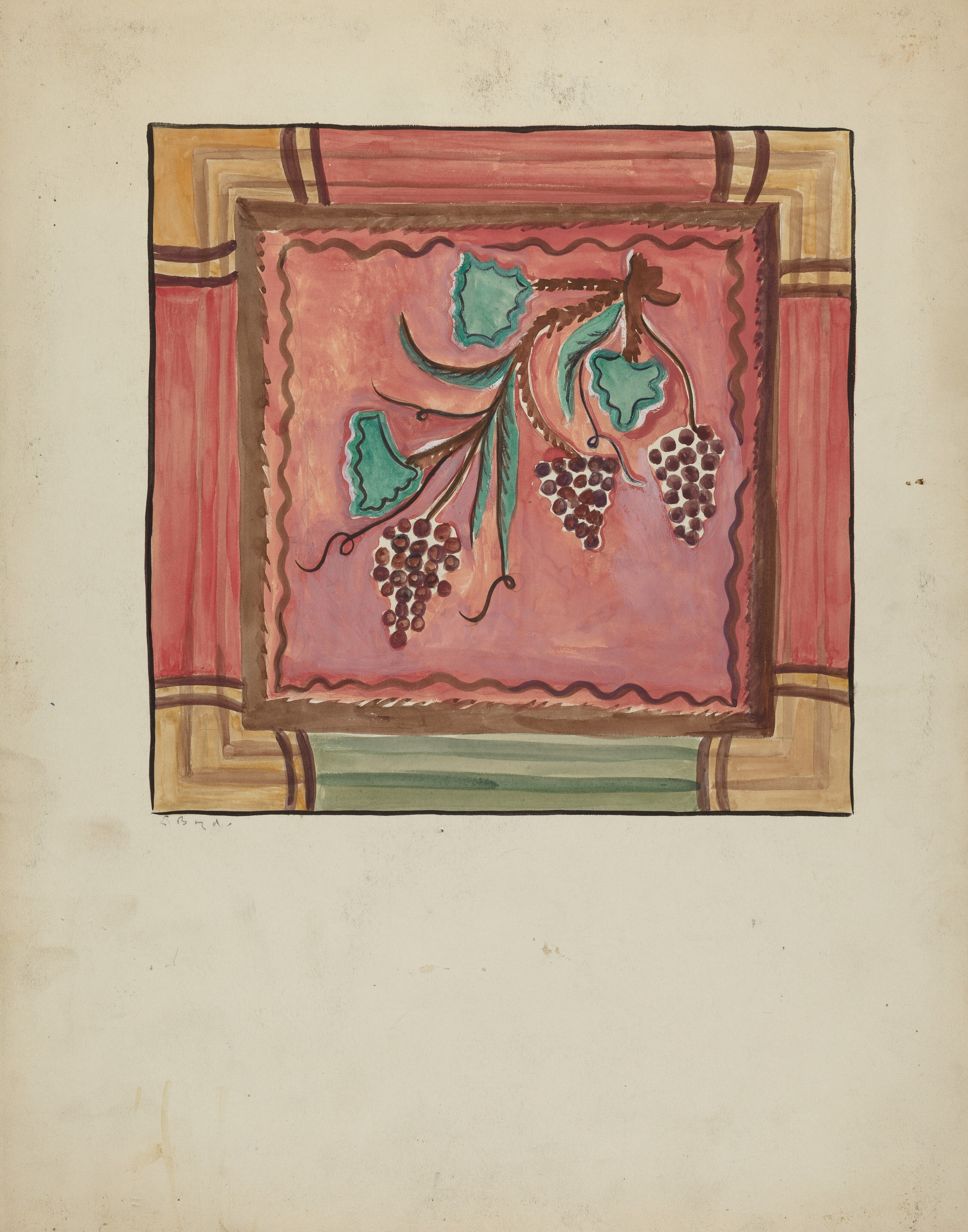
E Boyd, Detail of Panel from Reredos, Church of Sanctuario at Chimayo

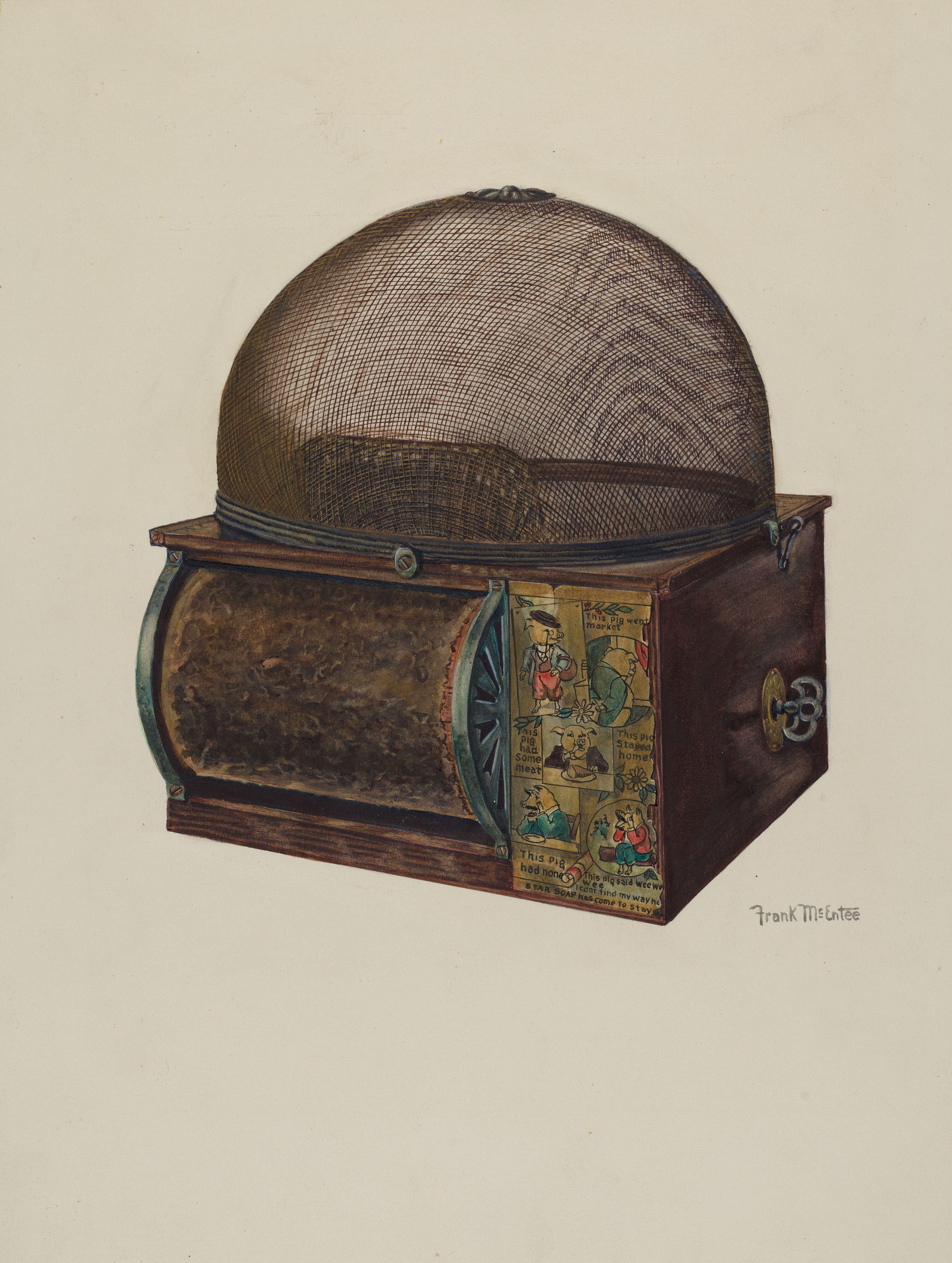
Frank McEntee, Fly Catcher (1937)

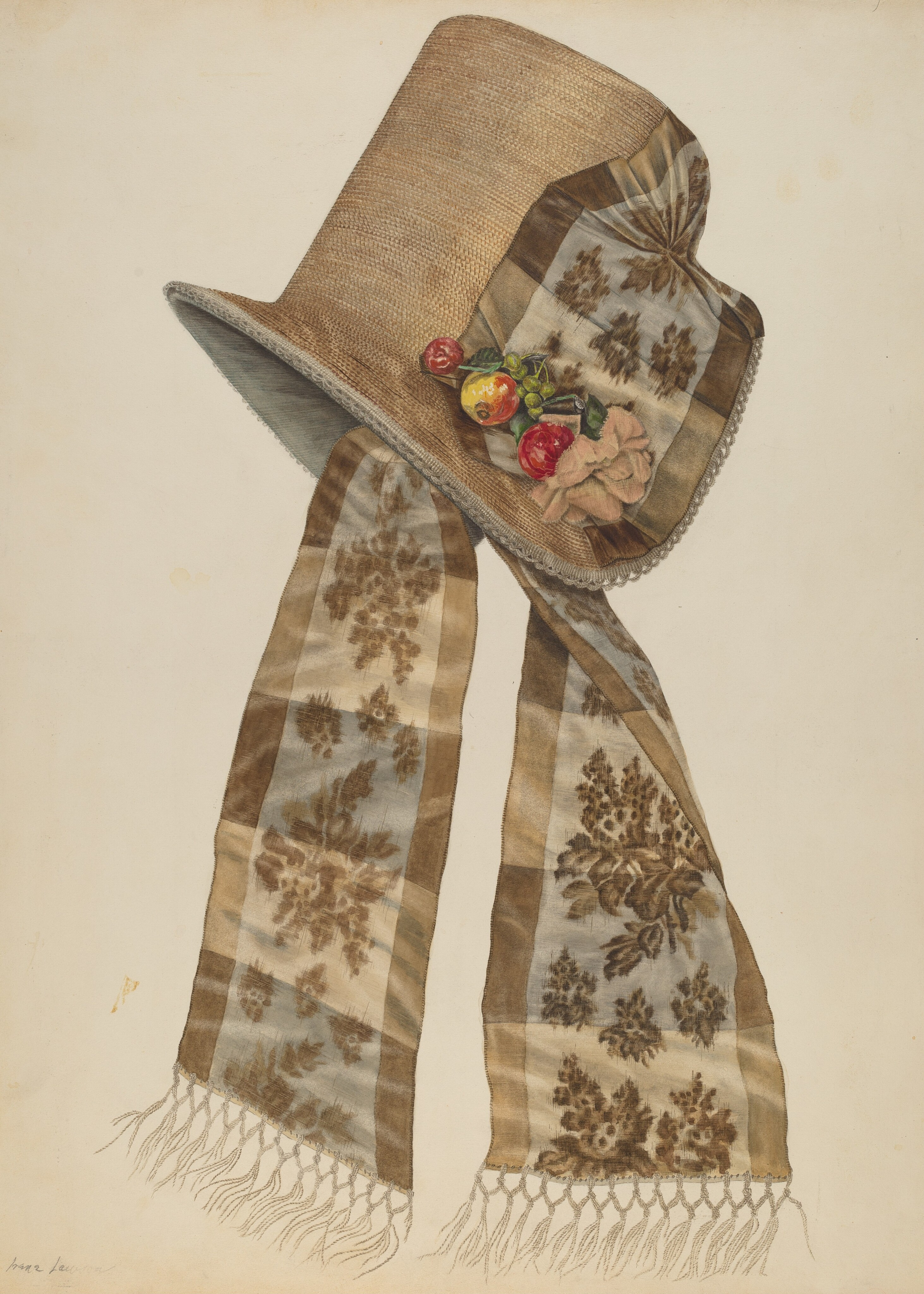
Irene Lawson, Poke Bonnet

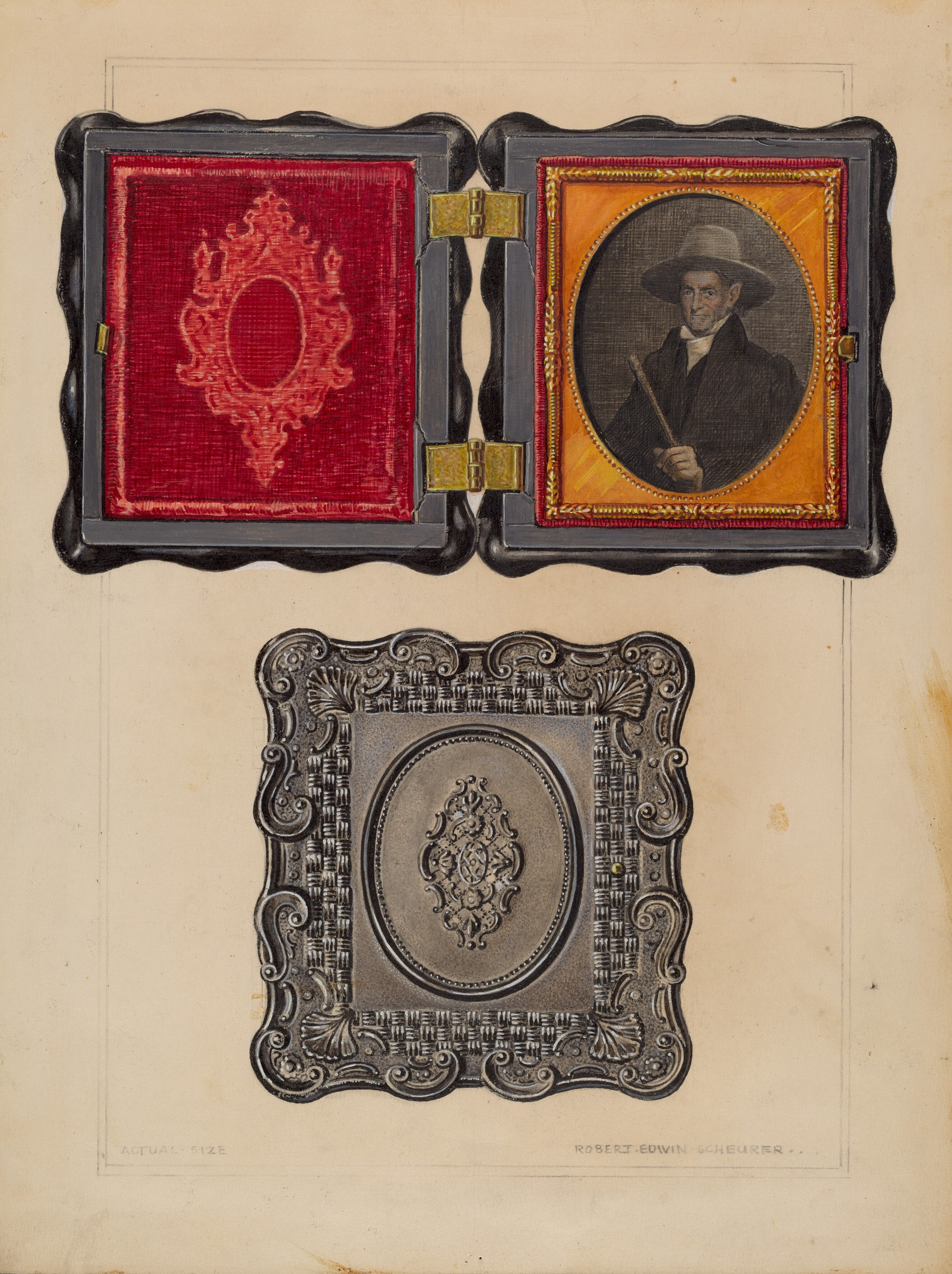
Robert Schuerer, Daguerreotype Case

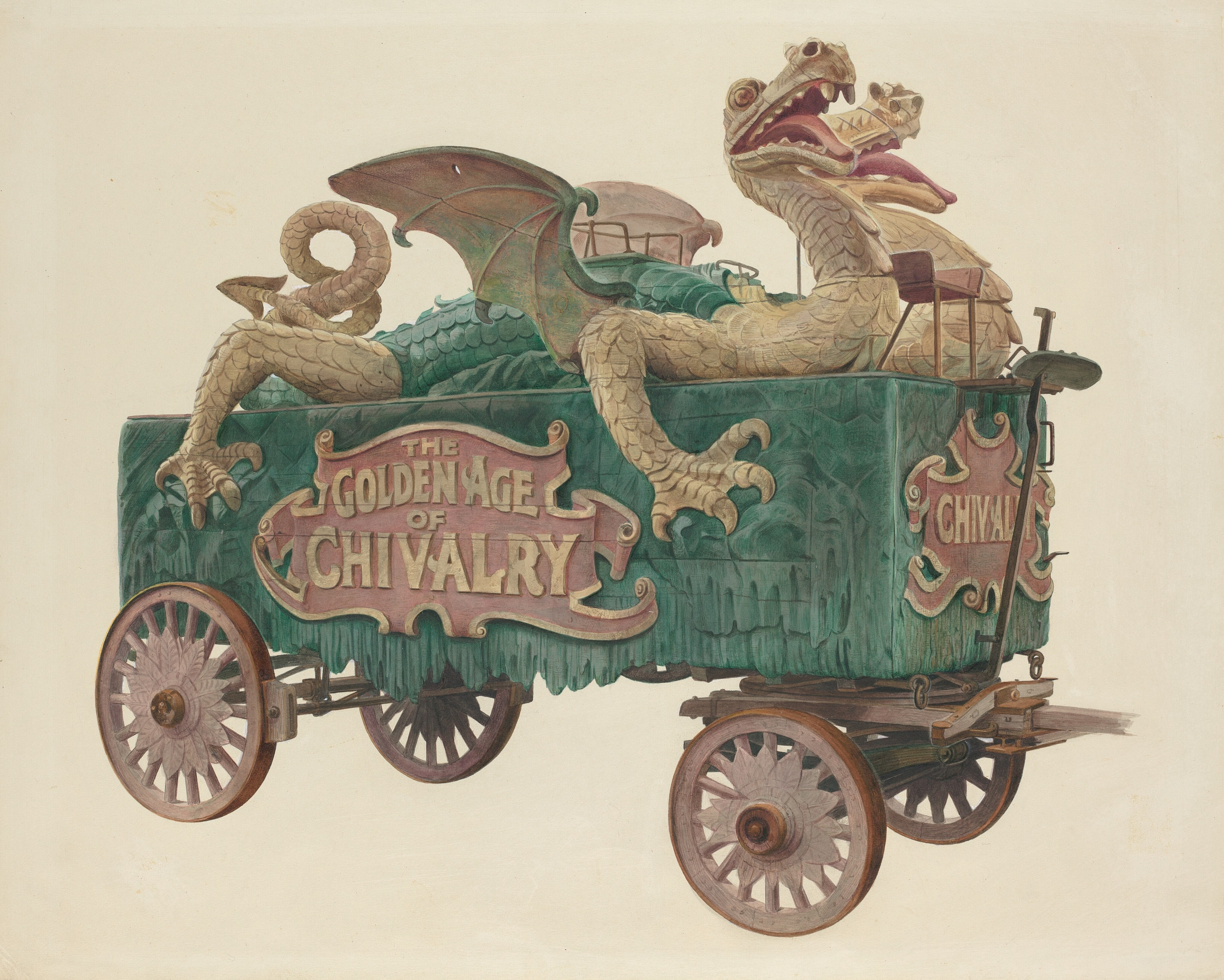
Howard Weld, "Age of Chivalry" Circus Wagon (1938)

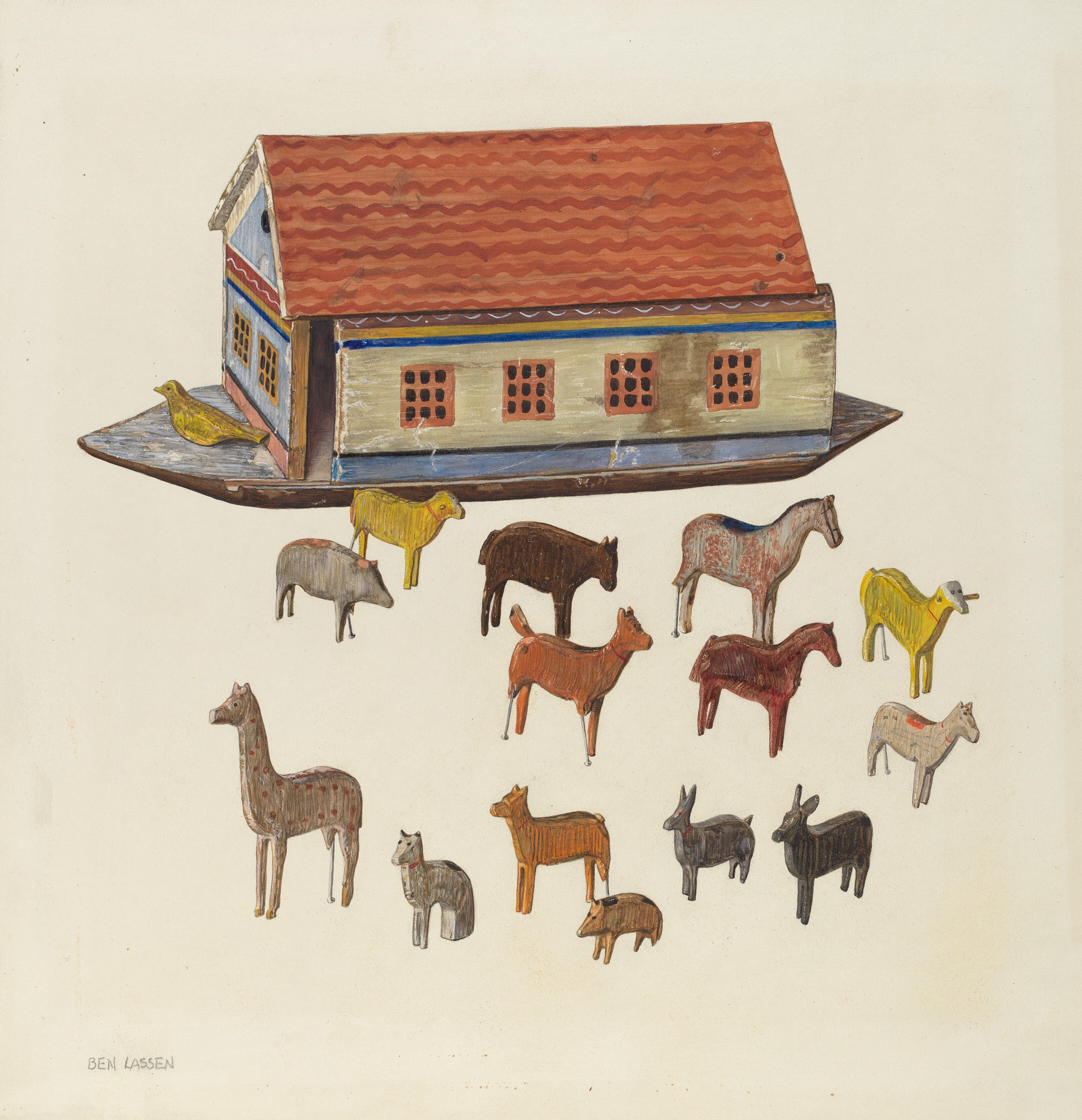
Ben Lassen, Noah's Ark and Animals

== Poster Division ==
The WPA Poster Division was headed by Richard Floethe. The WPA Poster Division is thought to have produced upward of 35,000 designs and printed some two million posters, originally by hand but quickly transitioning to widespread adoption of the silkscreen process. The Poster Division began in New York City and by 1938 had artists in 18 states; the Chicago unit was the second-most productive after New York. According to preeminent New Deal art historian Francis V. O’Connor, only about 2,000 surviving examples of WPA poster art are held in the nation’s library and museum print collections.

== WPA Art Recovery Project ==
External videos
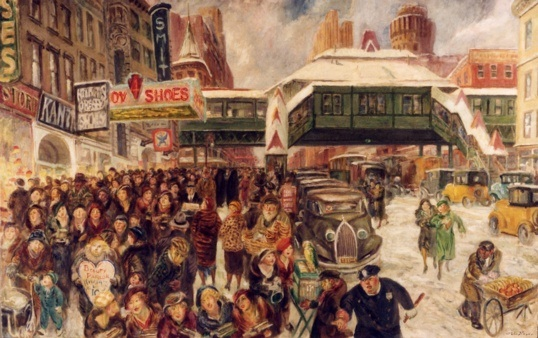
- Returning America’s Art to America, General Services Administration

Hundreds of thousands of artworks were commissioned under the Federal Art Project. Many of the portable works have been lost, abandoned, or given away as unauthorized gifts. As custodian of the work, which remains federal property, the General Services Administration (GSA) maintains an inventory and works with the FBI and art community to identify and recover WPA art. In 2010, it produced a 22-minute documentary about the WPA Art Recovery Project, "Returning America’s Art to America", narrated by Charles Osgood.

In July 2014, the GSA estimated that only 20,000 of the portable works have been located to date. In 2015, GSA investigators found 122 Federal Art Project paintings in California libraries, where most had been stored and forgotten.

== See also ==
- List of Federal Art Project artists
- Section of Painting and Sculpture
- Public Works of Art Project
- Farm Security Administration which employed photographers.
