= David Margolis =

David Margolis may refer to:

- David Margolis (industrialist)
- David Margolis (artist)
