= Dane Chanase =

American painter

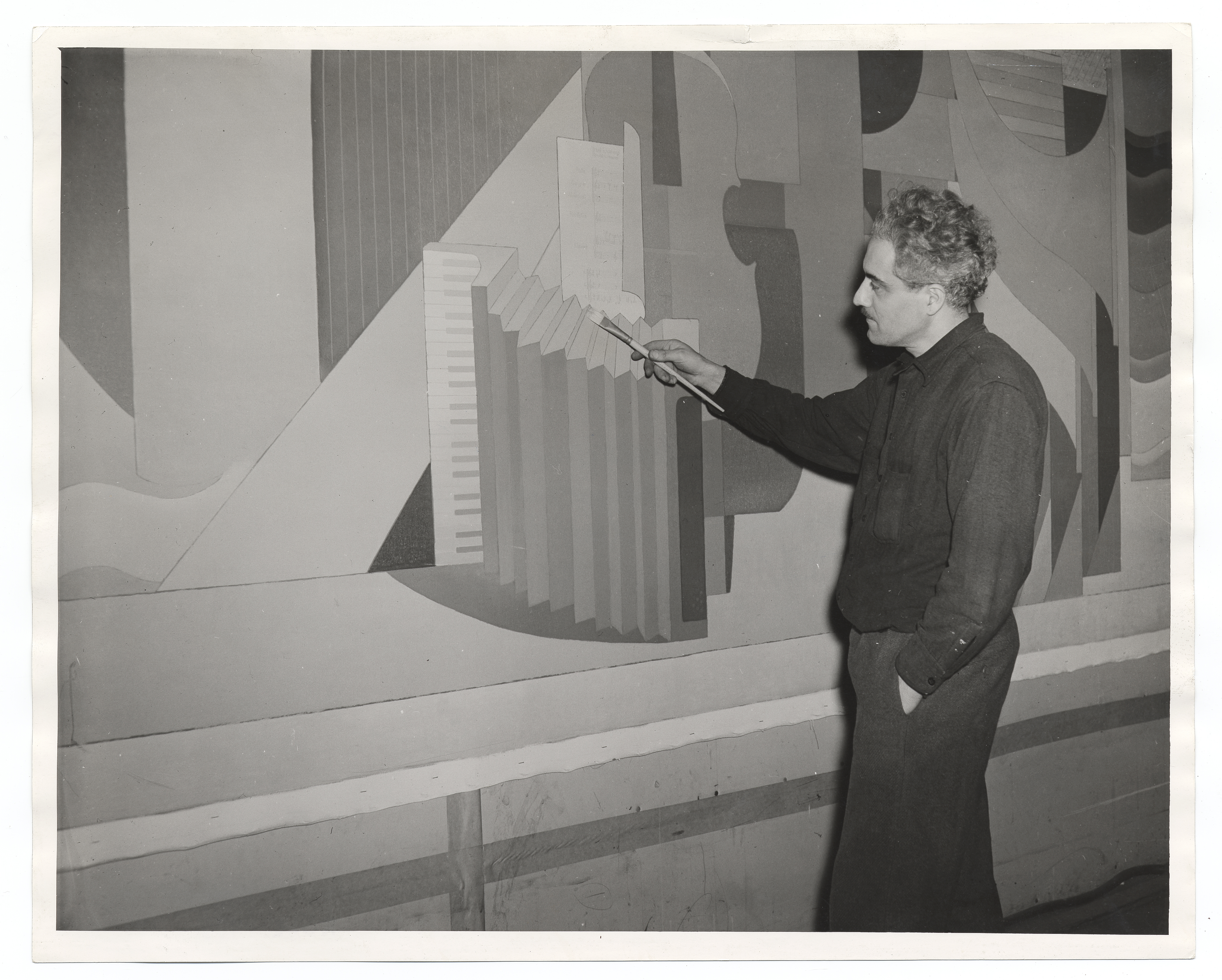
- Dane Chanase, from the Archives of American Art
- Born: 1894; Palermo, Italy
- Died: 1975 (aged 80–81); New York City
- Known for: Painting, printmaking

Riccardo Dane Chanase (October 21, 1894 - July 15, 1975) was an American painter and printmaker.

== Life ==
Chanase was born in Palermo, Italy. He exhibited at the Salon d'Automne. He served in World War I. He married artist Sheva Ausubel (1896–1975). He was a member of the Federal Art Project. He created a mural for the School of Industrial Art, Brooklyn. His work is held by the Smithsonian American Art Museum.

His papers are held at the Archives of American Art.

THE SCRAP BOOK: Most of below was taken from his personal Scrap Book that covered the years of 1927 to approximately 1933. From news articles, it would seem he arrived in Paris, France, in about 1927. At times between 1927 and the end of 1930, he traveled to Italy on a sketching trip while keeping Paris as his European home base. In 1930, Chanase participated in an exhibition at the Salon des Artistes Francais (May – June, 1930). His two canvases shown were "Silence" and "Saint-Tropez." Paris Art Notes in "The New York Herald (Paris)," 5-12-1930. "He had a big interest in Italian Primitives" from "The New York Herald (Paris)," June 1930. Chanase also participated in the "Holiday Hilarity" exhibition at Barreiro's with a canvas titled "Positano" from "The New York Herald (Paris)," June 1930. He also held a one-man show (his fourth career one-man show; his first in Paris) at Barreiro's, exhibiting 33 of his works from January 15–29, 1931. After about 5-year stint in Europe and Paris France where he made a mark as a very capable artist, Chanase returned to the US with his wife, Sheva, on October 26, 1932, on board the ship "Europa." Some of his WPA work included murals for the School of Aviation Trades as well as the murals at Welfare Island Hospital, New York, Baron de Hirsch Trade School, and Columbus High School, Washington, D.C. References: Mural Painting in New York City: Under the WPA Federal Art Project by Greta Berman (1978) American Prints in the Library of Congress; A Catalog of the Collection by Karen F Beall (ISBN 0801810779) "Dane Chanase papers, 1930-1960," (2000 items; unmicrofilmed), Archives of American Art Collections, http://siris-archives.si.edu/ The Art of Sheva Ausubel, Edited and published by Dane Chanase. Paperback. 4to - over 9¾" - 12" tall. 46p. illus.includes 3p. biography by Nathan Ausubel, Sheva's brother. printing circa 1960 - biography and photographs contributed by John Caputi
