= Florence Kawa =

American artist

- Born: 1912; Weyerhauser, WI
- Died: 2008 (aged 95–96); Green Bay, Wisconsin

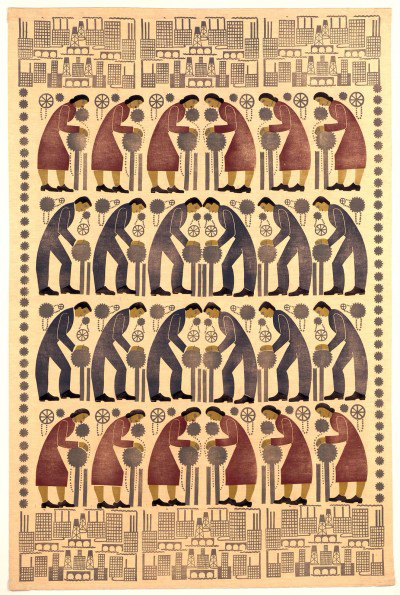
The Workers, wall hanging for the WPA Federal Art Project's Milwaukee Handicraft Project

Florence Kawa (1912–2008) was an American artist.

Kawa took part in the Works Project Administration’s Federal Art Project in the 1930s. Her work is included in the collections of the Smithsonian American Art Museum, the Franklin D. Roosevelt Presidential Library and Museum, the Madison Museum of Contemporary Art, and the Indianapolis Museum of Art.
