= Edwin B. Knutesen =

American painter (1901–1961)

Edwin B Knutesen
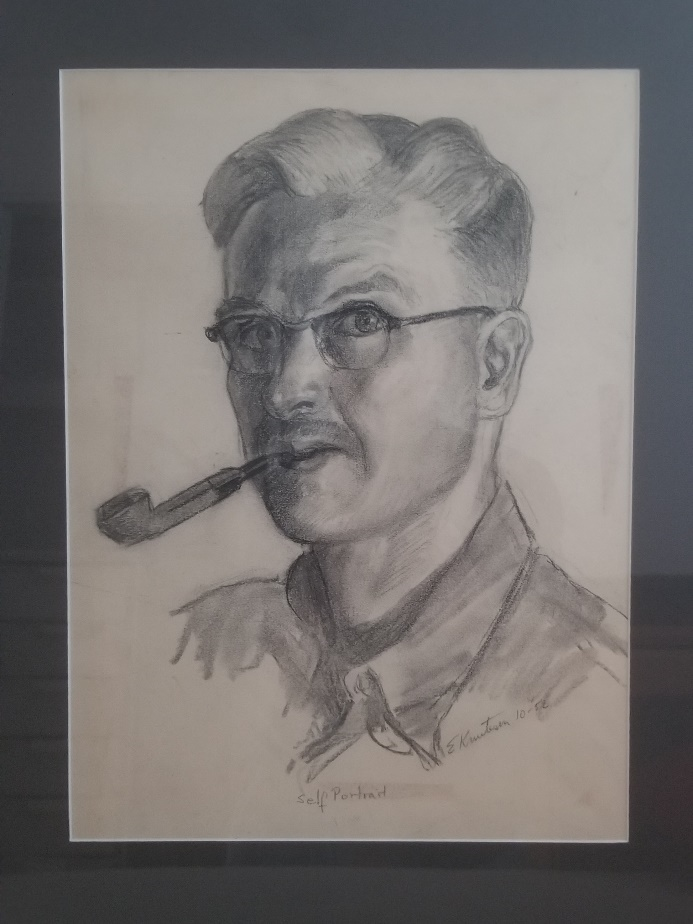
- Edwin Knutesen (self portrait)
- Born: May 26, 1901; La Crosse, Wisconsin
- Died: January 23, 1961 (aged 59); Milwaukee, Wisconsin
- Occupation: Artist

Edwin Bassett Knutesen (May 26, 1901 – January 23, 1961) was an American painter born in La Crosse, Wisconsin.

== Life and career ==
Knutesen became a student at the Pennsylvania Academy of Fine Arts (PAFA) in 1923, where he studied under George Oberteuffer, Hugh Breckenridge, and Daniel Garber. Later he worked as an illustrator for the Wisconsin News and attended evening classes at the Wisconsin State Normal School (University of Wisconsin Milwaukee). Knutesen moved to Paris France in 1925 where he studied at the Ecole Des Beaux – Arts de Paris and had a studio next to that of American Regionalist and Social Realist lithographer, Adolf Dehn.

Knutesen returned to America in 1928 aboard the SS Leviathan and attended the Wisconsin State Teachers College in Milwaukee (University of Wisconsin Milwaukee) where he received his degree in art education (1930). Knutesen found work as a teacher in New Orleans, Louisiana, then worked in Charleston, South Carolina for several years before returning to Milwaukee Wisconsin in the mid-1930s. During the Great Depression Knutesen was able to find employment with the Federal Arts Project, which was funded by the WPA.

When World War II began the WPA program was canceled and Knutesen found employment creating advertisements, but continued pursuing his art work. Knutesen was a member of Milwaukee Businessmen's Sketch Club and affiliated with the Wisconsin Art Teachers (WAT). He frequently exhibited in Wisconsin State Fairs and Wisconsin Painters Shows, including the Thirty-First Annual Exhibition of Wisconsin Art in 1944. Knutesen won several awards including first place ribbon for a painting he entered at the Wisconsin State fair in 1957.

== Death ==
Knutesen died January 23, 1961, in Milwaukee, Wisconsin. A memorial exhibit was on display at the Charles Allis Art Museum from October 1 to 29, 1961.

== Quotes ==
- “Art is reflecting and accentuating man's own nature at its best”.

== Works ==
- "Kilbourn Avenue" – (Oil Painting) Part of the Federal Art Project of the Works Progress Administration. This painting was displayed at the offices of the League of Wisconsin Municipalities until 1993, when it was deposited with the Historical Society of Wisconsin. This painting is of a multiracial work crew removing trees, unloading a dump truck, and jackhammering on Kilbourn Avenue in Milwaukee Wisconsin.
- "Milwaukee Yacht Club" - (Watercolor on paper) Milwaukee Arts Board (MAB) collection.
- "Corn Husker" - (Watercolor on paper) for Federal Art Project, Works Programs Administration, Wisconsin. Bulletin of the Milwaukee Art Institute 1938 v12.
- “Milwaukee River” - (Watercolor on paper) 1938.
- Wisconsin WPA Art, shown at the Charles A. Wustum Museum of Fine Arts from February 22 through April 19, 1998 (in the Permanent Collection).
- "Planter" - (Oil on canvas) 1930s for Federal Art Program, Works Progress Administration (WPA), listed in National Stolen Art File (NSAF) database
