= August Henkel =

American artist (1880–1961)

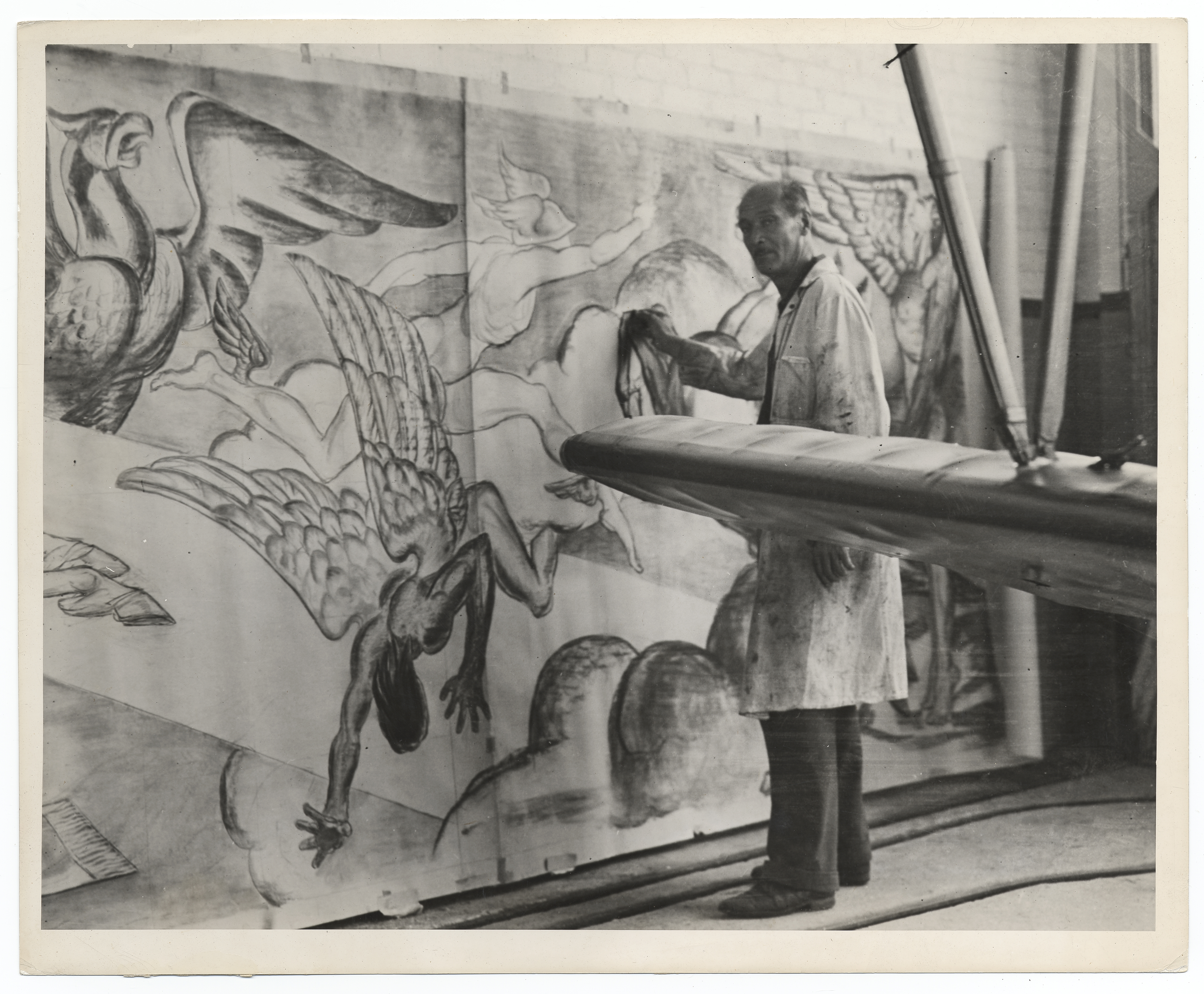
- August Henkel, from the Archives of American Art
- Born: 1880
- Died: 1961 (aged 80–81)
- Known for: Painting, murals, politician

August Henkel (1880 – 1961) was an American artist.

He was a Socialist candidate for 4th District of the New York State Assembly from Queens County in 1919, and Communist candidate for the 1st District of the House of Representatives from New York in 1934.

He was a member of the Federal Art Project, and worked on a mural at Floyd Bennett Field with Eugene Chodorow. There was a controversy about Joseph Stalin appearing in the mural. In 1940, he refused to sign a loyalty oath, resulting in the destruction of the mural.
