= Sakari Suzuki =

American painter

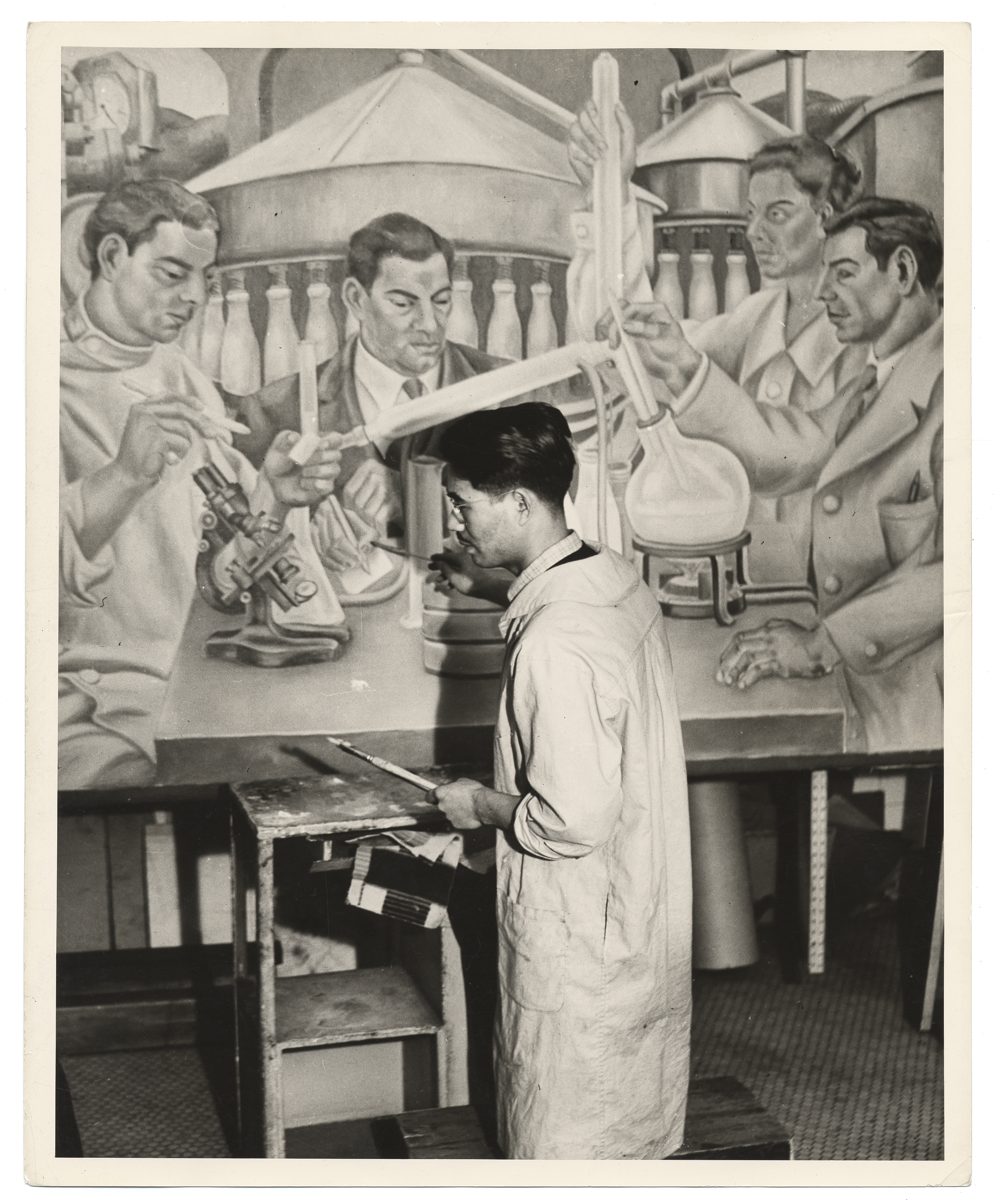
- Born: 10 October 1899; Iwate, Japan
- Died: January 1995 (aged 95); Chicago, Illinois

Sakari Suzuki (10 October 1899 – January 1995) was an American artist born in Japan.

== Biography ==
Suzuki was born in Iwate, Japan. He moved to San Francisco in 1918 to join his father. Suzuki attended California School of Fine Arts there in 1924. From 1932 until 1936 he exhibited in New York. In 1936 he worked for the Federal Art Project creating murals at the Willard Parker Hospital, which is now demolished.

Suzuki moved to Chicago, Illinois in about 1951 and died in January 1995.
