= Sheva Ausubel =

American painter and textile artist

Archives of American Art - Sheva Ausubel - 3163 (cropped)

Sheva Ausubel (1896–1957) was an American painter and textile artist.

== Life ==
She studied at the National Academy of Design and with André Lhote. She married artist Dane Chanase (1895–1975). After a stint of about five years in Europe and Paris, the couple returned to the US on October 26, 1932, on board the ship "Europa".

Ausubel was a member of the Federal Art Project.
