= Monty Lewis (artist) =

American artist

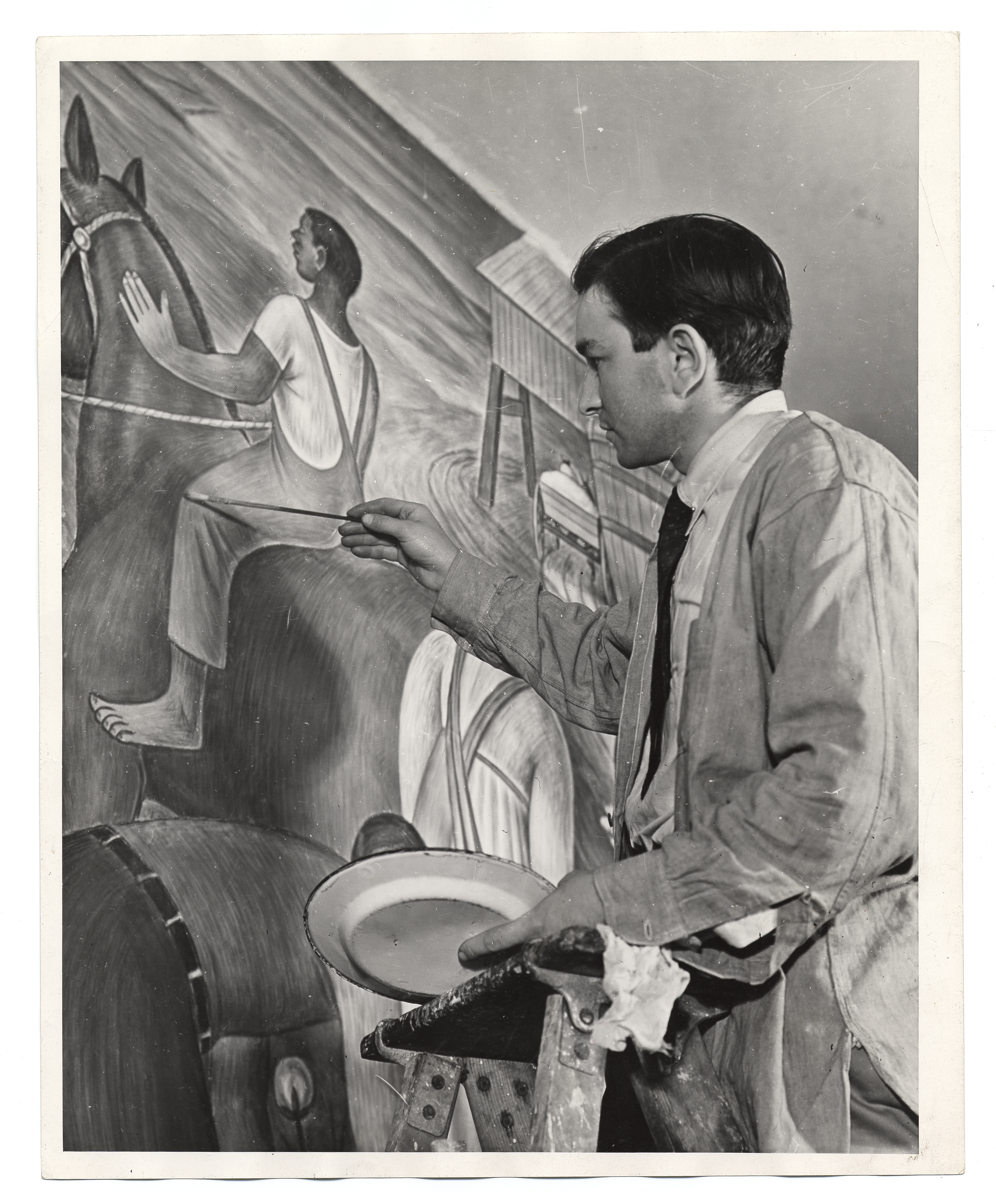
Monty Lewis

Monty Lewis (1907–1997) was an American painter, muralist, and educator. He was a 1930 Guggenheim Fellow.

== Life ==
Lewis was born in Cardiff, Wales. He studied at the Art Students League of New York where he met his fellow artist wife, Mary Ellis Lewis. He was a member of the Federal Art Project, and painted murals at the Museum of Man building at the 1939 New York World's Fair as well as public schools in New Jersey.

He was founder and director of the Coronado School of Fine Arts. His papers are held at the Archives of American Art. Monty had three daughters, one who is well known Chicago artist Linda Lewis Kramer (https://www.lindalewiskramer.com/)
