= Francis V. O'Connor =

American art historian (1937–2017)

Francis Valentine O'Connor (February 14, 1937 – November 20, 2017) was an American art historian who was pioneering scholar of the visual art of the New Deal and an expert on the contemporary artist Jackson Pollock.

== Life ==
O'Connor was born Brooklyn in 1937 to bank clerk Frank J. O'Connor and his wife Blanche Veronica Whalen (1900-1974).

He attended Manhattan College, where he earned a bachelor's degree in English in 1959. He then studied at Johns Hopkins University, earning a master's degree in creative writing in 1960.

He then began a doctorate in art history under Christopher Gray with a thesis on the early years of Jackson Pollock, which he completed in 1965. The findings culminated in a catalog for the Pollock retrospective in the Museum of Modern Art in 1967, which summarized the research from the dissertation.

In 1964 he began teaching at the University of Maryland as an assistant professor and in 1966 he moved to Johns Hopkins' Evening College. In the same year he received a grant from the National Endowment for the Arts and conducted research on New Deal artwork in New York state. He wrote a journal article on the New York projects in 1969, and in the 1970s published two essential volumes on New Deal art: (Art for the millions: Essays from the 1930s and The New Deal Art projects: an anthology of memoirs), as well as consulting on the groundbreaking New Deal Art: California exhibition at the De Saisset Gallery at the University of Santa Clara in 1976. He is considered the "leader of a small group of art historians who in the late 1960s and early 1970s did the initial research on the New Deal's visual arts programs."

In 1970, O'Connor joined the National Collection of Fine Arts, now part of the Smithsonian Museum of American Art, as a research associate. He was also a frequent visiting professor at Johns Hopkins University, American University and Corcoran College of Art and Design. From 1972 to 1977 he was an associate professor at the Union Graduate School and a lecturer in the Whitney Museum of American Art program.

From 1972 he formed, together with the art dealer Eugene Victor Thaw, the artist Lee Krasner (Pollock’s widow), the curator William S. Lieberman and art dealer Donald McKinney, a commission to assess the authenticity of thousands of works by artist Jackson Pollock. This activity resulted in a four-volume catalog raisonné in 1978. A supplementary volume was published in 1995. The work has been called one of the six best catalogs raisonné ever produced. O’Connor remained a member of the Pollock-Krasner’s "authentication board," devoted to distinguishing real Pollocks from forgeries, and frequently testified on behalf of the foundation during litigation. One article about such a dispute described O’Connor as a "stately Old World-style connoisseur with a Vandyke beard and curled mustache, who believes erudition and a practiced eye are essential to judging authenticity."

In the 1980s, O'Connor worked intensively on the history of American murals and received a grant from the United States Capitol Historical Society for his research. In 1982 he was one of the cofounders of the Association of Independent Historians of Art (AIHA).

In 1990 he was Robert Sterling Clark Visiting Professor of Art History at Williams College and in 1993 he was Visiting Professor of Art History at George Washington University in Washington, D.C.

In 1994 he was a named a fellow of the National Humanities Center while he worked on a book about Thomas Jefferson and the French Revolution.

O’Connor had a strong interest in integrating techniques from the arts and sciences. In 2005, he collaborated with Richard Taylor, a physics professor from the University of Oregon, when investigating a collection of paintings known as the Matter Collection. This collaboration involved using computers to detect fractal patterns in Pollock’s works. Taylor introduced O’Connor to the mathematician Benoit Mandelbrot (1924-2010), pioneer of fractals and author of the book Fractal Geometry of Nature, and they had a number of productive discussions.

In 2010 he created a website called The Mural in America to publish decades of work on the vast subject of wall art in the U.S.

He died suddenly, at his home in Manhattan, in 2017.

== Publications ==
- Jackson Pollock. The Museum of Modern Art, New York, 1967
- The New Deal Art projects. An Anthology of Memoirs. Smithsonian Institution Press, Washington, 1972. ISBN 0-87474-113-0
- Jackson Pollock: A Catalogue Raisonné of Paintings, Drawings, and Other Works coauthored with Eugene Thaw, Yale University Press, New Haven, 1978
- Jackson Pollock: The Black Pourings, 1951 to 1953. Institute of Contemporary Art, Boston, 1980
- Jackson Pollock: A Catalogue Raisonné of Paintings, Drawings, and Other Works. Supplement, Yale University Press, New Haven, London, 1995
- Charles Seliger: Redefining Abstract Expressionism. Hudson Hills Press, New York, 2003
