= Charlie Guyer =

Australian rules footballer (1909–1977)

Personal information
- Full name: Charlie Guyer
- Born: 17 February 1909
- Died: 3 September 1977 (aged 68)
- Height: 184 cm (6 ft 0 in)
- Weight: 84 kg (185 lb)

Playing career^{1}
| Years | Club | Games (Goals) |
| 1936 | St Kilda | 1 (1) |
- ^{1} Playing statistics correct to the end of 1936.

Charlie Guyer (17 February 1909 – 3 September 1977) was an Australian rules footballer who played with St Kilda in the Victorian Football League (VFL).
