= David Margolis (artist) =

American painter

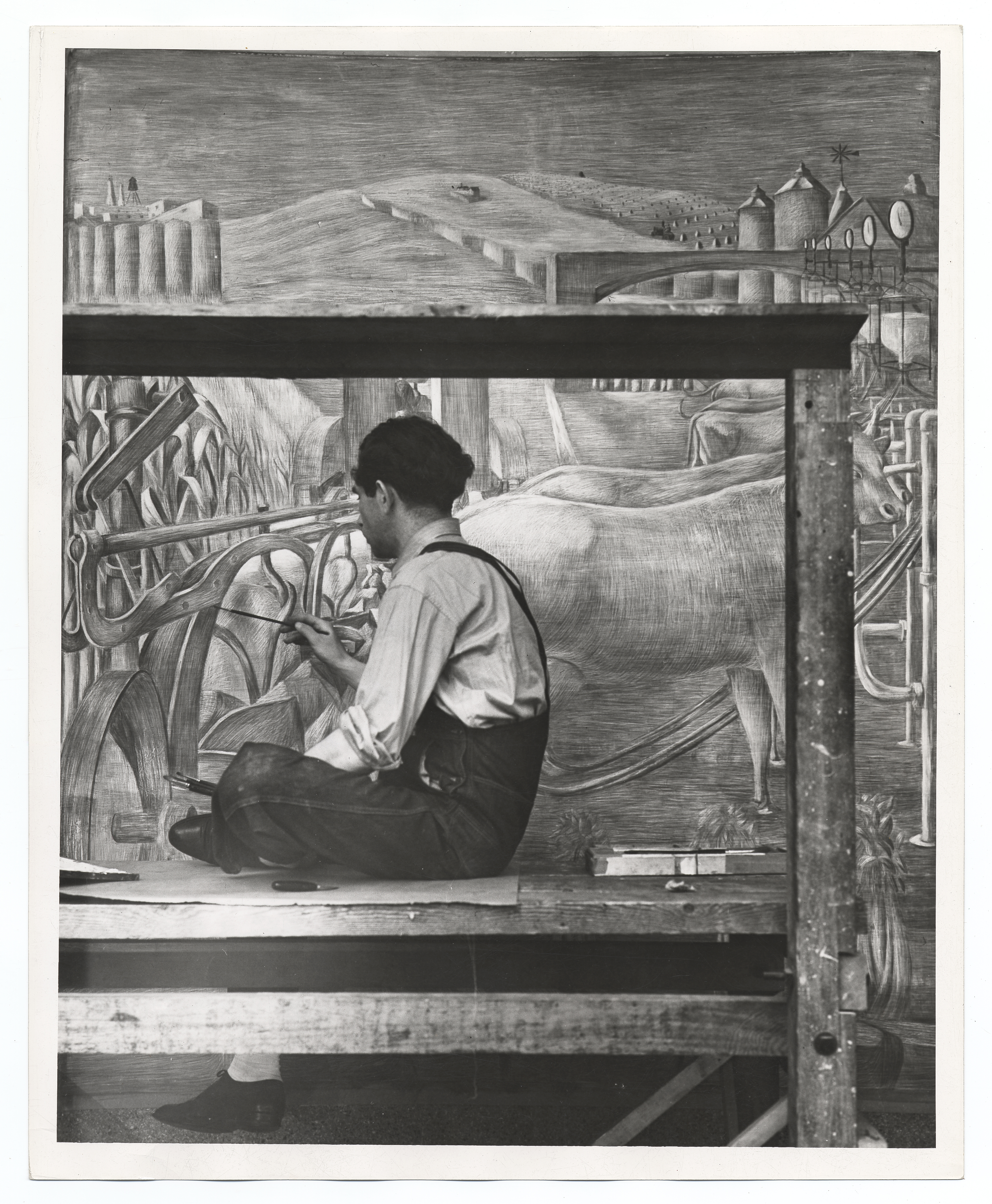
- David Margolis, from the Archives of American Art
- Born: 1911
- Died: 2003 (aged 91–92); New York City
- Known for: Painting, murals
- Notable work: Materials of Relaxation
- Awards: Special Recognition Award for WPA murals, Public Design Commission of the City of New York

David Margolis (September 3, 1911 — October 8, 2003) was an American artist known for his WPA murals in New York City. Margolis was born in born in Volochysk, Ukraine moved to the United States in 1931. He was educated at the Odessa Academy for Fine Arts and the Ecole De Beaux Art in Montreal as well as the National Academy Art and the Arts Students League in New York City.

== Career ==
Margolis is best known for his fresco mural in the entrance rotunda of Bellevue Hospital Center. He worked with two other painters, earning $26.50 per week.

I was painting in a place of distress. All around me, it was like it is today. So many people, so much drama. Life, death. Crying, screaming and also laughing. And in the middle I was painting murals that told the story of human progress. Nature. Agriculture. Industry. And the central panels by the doorway representing Construction, Destruction and Reconstruction. Remember, it was the Depression.

From 1937 to 1941, Margolis spent nights and weekends in the various pavilions of the hospital painting. he later told a New York Times reporter that he was "painting murals that told the story of human progress."

By 1945, however, the atrium was abandoned, and the murals were lost. At various times, the atrium was used as a storeroom, a cafeteria, office space, and a used-clothing repository for homeless patients. Some murals were painted over. Others were covered by layers of kitchen grease or wallpaper.

In 1991, Bellevue underwent a major architectural redesign and the atrium was to become the main entranceway to the hospital (a significant upgrade from the two-door entrance crammed next to a concrete parking garage). Excavation of the rotunda revealed the murals, which the artist had—perhaps prophetically—coated with protective wax. The Municipal Art Society helped track down Margolis, who had not seen the murals in half a century and never expected to see them again. The 80-year-old artist spent close to a year helping with the restoration along with Loretta Kielar. He touched up the murals that contained his parents, his childhood dog, a friend who had fought in the Spanish civil war, an influential art curator, and the nurses and doctors who had befriended him during the original painting sessions.

Margolis enjoyed evenings at the Savoy Ballroom with abstract expressionist Willem de Kooning, and helped Diego Rivera install his murals at Rockefeller Center. He was a member of the Brooklyn Society of Artists and the Federal Art Project. In 1995, Margolis received a Design Award from the Public Design Commission of New York City for his murals painted for the WPA.

== Family ==
His parents were Israel Margolis and Shendel (Russman) Margolis. His brother was Boris (Baruch) Margo (Margolis) (1902–1995). He married Ruth Margolis and had three children: Yeugenia, Helene, Adrienne. In 2000, he protested the demolition of the Poe house by New York University.
