= Irving Guyer =

American painter (1916–2012)

- Born: Irving Henry Guyer; April 24, 1916; Philadelphia, Pennsylvania, U.S.
- Died: February 14, 2012 (aged 95); Nevada City, California, U.S.
- Known for: Painting

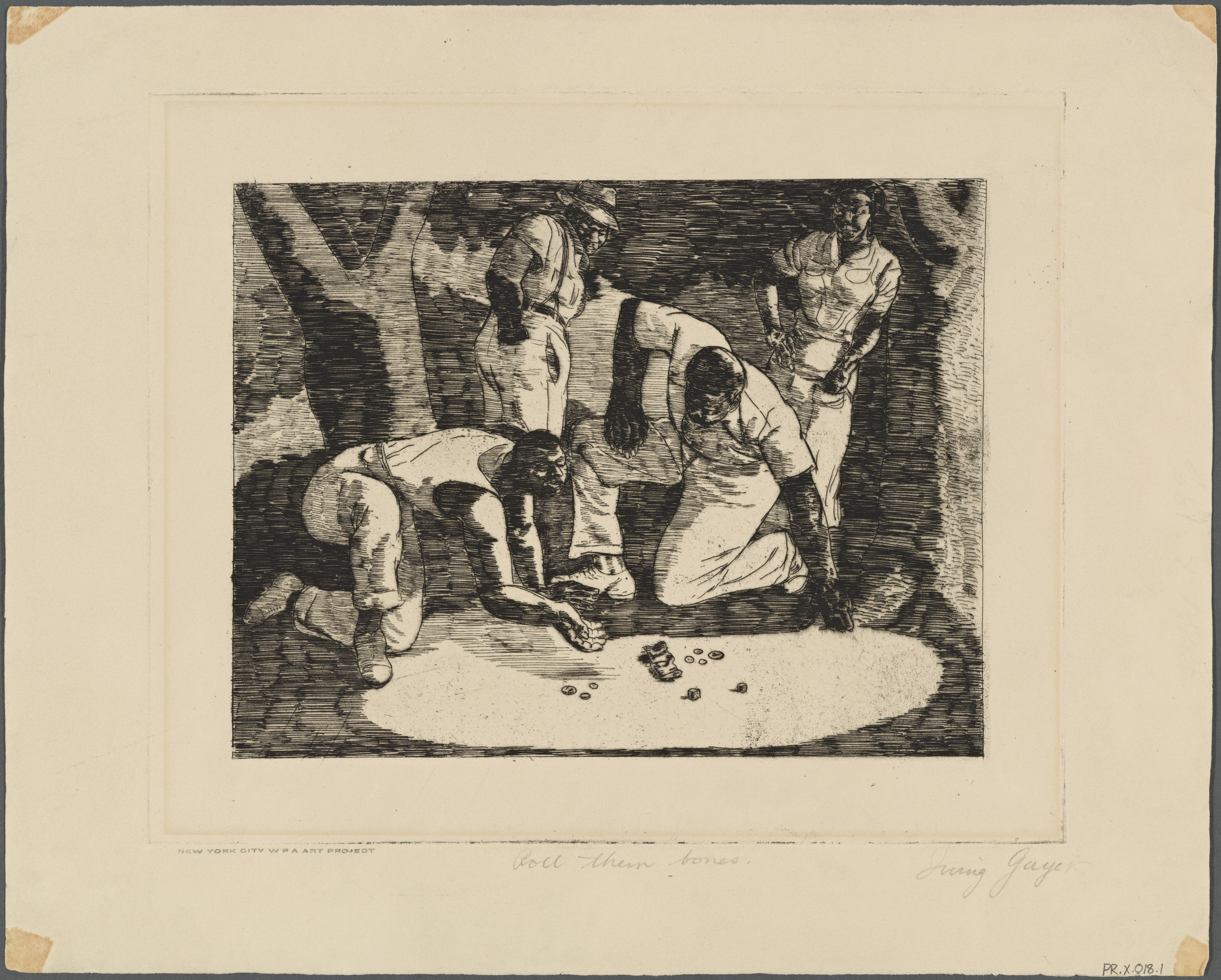
Roll Them Bones, by Irving Guyer for the Works Progress Administration

Irving Guyer (1916–2012) was an American painter. While successful in New York through the 1960s, Guyer chose to work away from the New York gallery scene for much of his career. In the last decades of his life, he developed increasingly innovative, formally sophisticated work, combining masterful landscape and color field painting with geometric abstraction. Recently, his later works were discovered and have been acquired by the Berkeley Art Museum and Reed College Art Collection.

== Early life ==
A son of Jewish immigrants from Poland and Russia, Guyer grew up in New York City and studied at the Art Students League of New York (1934-1937), the National Academy of Design (1933-1934) and the City College of New York (1932-1933). At 23, he was awarded first prize for painting at the 1939 World's Fair. In 1938 and 1939 he was employed by the Works Project Administration / Federal Art Project as a painter and printmaker. Guyer’s WPA prints are held in public collections, including the Metropolitan Museum of Art, the Smithsonian American Art Museum, the Brooklyn Museum, The Baltimore Museum of Art, the New York Public Library Print Collection, Spencer Museum of Art at the University of Kansas, and Indiana State University Permanent Art Collection. After being discharged from the Army in 1945, Guyer, who had married in 1942, chose to pursue a career in commercial art to support his family. For the next thirty years or so he worked in New York City for advertising studios, including his own (with partners), while continuing to paint.

Pinetum: Leaning Pine, 2007. Oil on four-part canvas.

== Mid-career ==
In the 1960s Guyer was represented by the Paula Insel Gallery in New York. His paintings of this period employed both abstraction and figuration, often in combination. While this work was clearly part of the New York School, he resisted the call to adhere to a singular style in order to pursue his interest in artistic experimentation, a pursuit that lasted the rest of his life. After three successful solo shows, Guyer left the Insel Gallery to work on his painting free from the pressure of the art market. During this time, he continued to make his living as a commercial artist and designer, and stayed engaged with the art world by reading voluminously, experimenting in the studio, and keeping abreast of major exhibitions and movements. In 1975, Guyer and his wife moved to San Francisco. Guyer was profoundly affected by a major exhibition of Matisse cut-outs at the National Gallery of Art in 1977. For the next several years his paintings juxtaposed simplified opaque shapes in a series of dynamic abstracted Pacific Coast landscapes, which were shown in a number of venues in the San Francisco Bay Area, including Stanford University.

== Late career ==
In 1985, after retiring from the practice of commercial art, Guyer and his wife moved to Nevada City, in the Sierra Foothills of California, where he continued to paint in a small studio. His primary subject matter became the immediate Northern California landscape and light. His late work is increasingly abstract and simplified – a distillation of a lifetime of seeing, thinking, and painting. By the mid-2000s, he was making bold multi-canvas works, juxtaposing rectangular monochromatic painting with abstracted landscape forms. Guyer considered his late works, including the Cloud and Pinetum series, to be the strongest of his career. He exhibited the Pinetum series in the B. Sakato Garo Gallery in Sacramento in 2008. Although his eyesight was compromised by macular degeneration in his late eighties, Guyer continued painting with great energy until just a few days before his death at age 95. The simplified compositions of Guyer's late paintings, with their stark contrasts of light and dark, extreme close-up and distance views, texture and ground, may have been influenced by his increasing visual impairment, but also complete a trajectory discernible from his earliest works.

== Personal life ==
Guyer married Betty Rubenstein in 1942. They had four children and lived in suburban New York through the mid-1970s. One of his children is the artist Léonie Guyer. Another is the leading Kant scholar and philosopher of aesthetics Paul Guyer. They moved in San Francisco in 1975 and then to Nevada City, California for the rest of their lives. Guyer's final, unfinished work was a portrait of Betty, who had died two years before him.
