= Lawrence Lebduska =

American artist ((1894–1966)

Lawrence H. Lebduska (September 1, 1894 – 1966) was an American artist who became known as a housepainter.

== Early life ==
Born in Baltimore, Maryland, on September 1, 1894, his parents moved to Leipzig, Germany, when he was age five. While in Germany, he studied stained glass under Josef Svoboda.

Lebduska returned to the United States in 1912, first settling in Baltimore and later moving to New York City.

== Career ==
Lebduska was commissioned by interior designer Elsie de Wolfe to paint murals. He contributed to many group shows and had his first one-man show in 1936, which is said to have inspired Abby Aldrich Rockefeller to begin her folk-art collection.

Lebduska did a number of projects for the Work Projects Administration (WPA), but his work was relatively underappreciated until a gallery show six years before his death. Despite that, his works were frequently exhibited at a number of galleries, the Museum of Modern Art,

He has pieces in the permanent collection of a number of museums, including the Smithsonian American Art Museum, the Museum of Modern Art, the Zander Collection, and the Wadsworth Athenaeum.

== See also ==
- List of American artists 1900 and after
- List of people from Baltimore
- List of people from New York City
