= Mary E. Hutchinson =

American painter (1906–1970)

- Mary E. Hutchinson, Self Portrait, circa 1927
- Born: July 11, 1906; Melrose, Massachusetts
- Died: July 10, 1970 (aged 63); Atlanta, Georgia

Mary E. Hutchinson (July 11, 1906 in Melrose, Massachusetts – July 10, 1970 in Atlanta, Georgia) was an artist and art instructor from Atlanta who lived and worked in New York City during the years of the Great Depression and World War II. She specialized in figure painting, particularly portraits of female subjects. New York critics described these portraits as "sculptural," having a "bold yet rhythmic design," and often possessing a "haunted mood". Critics noted the "introspective" nature of some portraits whose subjects showed "an almost morbidly brooding sensitiveness." From 1934 to 1943 she was a member of the Art Teaching Staff of the WPA New York Federal Art Project. Following her return to Atlanta in 1945 Hutchinson was an art teacher in Catholic high schools.

== Art training ==
Hutchinson took an art course while a student at Agnes Scott College (Note: Hutchinson said she failed her college art class because she could not tolerate its rigid technical discipline.) and subsequently studied at the National Academy of Design where she won three awards, one each in sculpture, drawing, and etching. (Note: Information is lacking about the sculpture prize that Hutchinson won. The drawing prize was a Suydam bronze medal, shared with Joan Starr, which she received for a figure study while attending the women's night class in 1928. The etching award was an honorable mention shared with Virginia Snedeker and Dorothy Drew. Named after James Augustus Suydam, the Suydam medal was originally a pair of prizes, silver and bronze medals, given to the students who made the best work in a live-model drawing competition. In Hutchinson's time there were multiple awards in the Antique and Life Schools which were given to students in the men's and women's day and night classes for drawings of heads and figures, both from life and from classical reproductions. In 1929 a report in the alumnae quarterly of Agnes Scott College said that Hutchinson had won "quite a bit of recognition" while studying at the Academy.) She began taking classes at the academy as a scholarship student in 1926 and took her last class in 1931. During her five years of study her main interest was sculpture.

== Artistic career, early 1930s ==
In the year following her last class at the Academy Hutchinson showed in group exhibitions at the G.R.D. Studio, (Note: The G.R.D. Studio was an "excellent little gallery at 58 West Fifty-fifth Street, operated through the courtesy of Mrs. Philip J. Roosevelt, mainly as a forum for young and unknown artists." A non-commercial venture which charged no commissions, it was founded in 1928 as a memorial to the artist Gladys Roosevelt Dick by her sister, Mrs. Philip J. Roosevelt.) in a restaurant-cum-gallery called the Jumble Shop, (Note: The Jumble Shop was a restaurant located near art galleries in Greenwich Village. Early in 1932 it began to display pictures by young American artists which had been selected by a committee of artists, Guy Pène du Bois, H.E. Schnakenberg and Reginald Marsh.) and in a sidewalk art sale in Washington Square Park. (Note: The sidewalk art sale was put on by the Artists' Aid Committee, a group of struggling artists whose chair was Vernon C. Porter. The group obtained permission to hold the event and invited artists to participate, charging no fees and permitting artists to sell directly to the public. Begun in May 1932 the exhibitions have continued annually or semi-annually into this century.) In 1933 she was given both group and duo exhibitions at the Painters and Sculptors' Gallery (Note: Founded in November 1931, the Painters and Sculptors' Gallery offered low cost pictures and sculptures suitable for the small apartments in which most New Yorkers lived. Called a cooperative venture, it offered aspiring and unknown artists the opportunity to obtain sales at low commissions and with no delay in payment from the gallery. It was organized by a young painter, Margit Varga, whose family had emigrated to New York from Hungary when she was ten.) and participated in group shows at the Brevoort, Roosevelt, and Weston hotels. (Note: One of the hotel exhibitions employed an unusual format. Put on by the Artists Aid Committee it permitted prospective customers to rent pictures with the option of buying later if they chose. Styled as an "Art Lending Library," the exhibition appeared in the Empress Gallery and Adam Room of the Weston Hotel. In this show, a review in the New York Sun singled out a painting of Hutchinson's called "Aria Trista" as being "particularly striking" and said her work had been receiving favorable attention from critics.) The statement that Hutchinson's portraits possessed a "haunted mood" came from Howard Devree's review of the duo exhibition which also said the portraits were "instinct with sympathy." (Note: Howard Devree (1891–1966) became an assistant art editor at The New York Times in 1926 and succeeded to the post of art editor on the death of Times critic Edward Alden Jewell in 1947. Between 1926 and 1947 he worked for the Sunday edition of the paper writing book reviews and cultural articles as well as art criticism.)

Mary E. Hutchinson, "Helen," circa 1934, 31.5 x 20.5 inches (80 x 52 cm.)

Early in 1934 Hutchinson was given her first solo exhibition and two of her paintings were purchased by the new High Museum of Art in Atlanta. (Note: The works purchased by the High Museum were "Two of Them" and "Italian Girl." The High Museum evolved from the Atlanta Art Association when, in 1926, Harriet Harwell Wilson High, wife of a prominent Atlanta department store owner, donated her family's Peachtree Street townhouse to the association for use as a museum. Known for its holdings of nineteenth- and twentieth-century American artists, its collections also include contemporary art, photographs, and works by African-Americans.) Appearing at Midtown Galleries, the solo exhibition drew praise and generated the most detailed consideration of her work to date. (Note: The Midtown Galleries was founded by Alan D. Gruskin in 1932 as a cooperative venture in which participating artists both helped pay the costs of exhibitions and contributed their labor to staging them. Gruskin and a partner, Francis C. Healey, publicized the business via weekly fifteen-minute radio broadcasts. Gruskin also used print advertisements, review articles, and catalog essays to promote the gallery and its artists. He was one of the first gallery owners to circulate exhibitions among colleges and art associations in small communities that lacked museums and commercial galleries. In addition to running the gallery he consulted with corporate clients on the use of art in space design and he wrote monographs, including Painting in the U.S.A. (Garden City, New York, Doubleday & Co., 1946), The water colors of Dong Kingman, and how the artist works (New York, Studio Publications, 1958), and The painter and his techniques: William Thon (New York, Viking Press, 1964).) Devree said her talent was maturing, revealing skillful design and a subtler use of color He also remarked on the introspection, sensitivity, and brooding quality brought out in her subjects and on their sculptural quality. A review in the New York Sun paid Hutchinson a compliment by reproducing one of the portraits, "Helen," but the text was not so complimentary, noting a use of hard outlines to reinforce contours which resulted in a loss of "an enveloping atmosphere" and suggesting that her portraits made too "bald a statement." Later in 1934 and over the following two years Hutchinson participated in group shows at Midtown Galleries and the A.C.A. Gallery. (Note: The A.C.A. Galleries, also known as the American Contemporary Arts Gallery, was founded in 1932 to support the careers of little-known American artists by Lithuanian-born journalist and author, Herman Baron, along with the artists Stuart Davis, Yasuo Kuniyoshi, and Adolf Dehn. Hutchinson's paintings at the A.C.A. exhibition included a departure from her usual portraits, called "Sixth Avenue L," which, said a critic for the New York Sun, "is a solid and compactly organized canvas, marked by an expressive use of curves and soberly satisfying color." The critic said the portraits were "more in her usual sculpturesque vein" and praised one showing Margit Varga, "in which there is a hint of a sensitive and elusive personality.") She also began showing in group exhibitions sponsored by the National Association of Women Painters and Sculptors whose juries presented her with awards in 1934, 1935, and 1938. (Note: In 1934 Hutchinson won a first prize for a painting called "Doll." In 1935 she won the Marjorie R. Leidy Memorial Prize of $100 for "Nude." In 1938 she was awarded the Marcia Brady Tucker Prize of $100 for "The Duet.") In 1935 Hutchinson participated in a duo-exhibition at the Ten Dollar Gallery showing, as Devree said, "brooding portraits" that "have been seen in a number of local galleries" along with abstract pictures made by her mother, Minnie Belle Hutchinson. (Note: Early in 1934 the Upstairs Gallery changed its name to the Ten Dollar Gallery and set a top price of $10 on each of the works it offered for sale. The Upstairs Gallery was founded late in 1933 by Mrs. Marguerite Zimbalist at the same location to sell works by deserving artists at low cost. Marguerite Zimbalist was a poet and friend of the artist Louis Eilshemius. Minnie Belle Hutchinson took up poetry and art after Hutchinson left home for New York. Hutchinson reported that she convinced her mother to take up painting and said her style grew out of a practice of doodling.) At that time she also became a member of the New York Society of Women Artists, showing in the tenth annual exhibition of that group and eliciting a favorable comment on one of her paintings. (Note: In 1926 a group of women artists founded the New York Society of Women Artists as a progressive alternative to the National Association of Women Artists. Membership was originally limited to thirty, later lifted to fifty, and each member was allotted the same amount of space in its exhibitions. Of the works she contributed to the 1935 annual exhibition of the society (held at the Squibb Galleries), a critic for The New York Times commented that "Mary Hutchinson, momentarily abandoning her preoccupation with the papery young ladies, gives us a diverting 'Negro Shack,' gay and piquant in treatment.")

== Artistic career, late 1930s ==
In the second half of the 1930s Hutchinson continued to participate in group exhibitions held by the National Association of Women Painters and Sculptors as well as ones held by the Midtown and other galleries. Beginning in 1936 paintings of hers were selected to appear in exhibitions sponsored by the New York Municipal Art Committee, (Note: New York's mayor, Fiorello La Guardia established the Municipal Art Committee in the fall of 1934 to provide employment for New York's musicians, performers, artists, and other out-of-work arts workers. Early in 1936 the committee opened a gallery, the Temporary Municipal Galleries, 62 W. 53rd Street. Groups of artists submitted applications to the committee and exhibitions were changed every two months. In May 1936 Hutchinson joined with eleven other women in a successful application to appear in a Municipal Art Committee show. The other eleven artists were Theresa Bernstein, Dorothy Eisner, Dorothy Lubell Feigin, Lucie Hourdebaight, Adelaide Lawson, Magda F. Pach, Mildred Peabody, Edna L. Perkins, Ellen Ravenscroft, Jane Rogers, and Mary Tannahill.) the Art Mart, (Note: Miriam Sachs and Betty Ackerberg founded the Art Mart in 1935 to show the work of young American artists in gallery space on the mezzanine of the Sachs Quality Furniture Store on 25th Street. They offered paintings, prints, and drawings at prices ranging from $1.00 to $100.00.) and the Art Institute of Chicago. She also began to exhibit in annual shows held by the Society of Independent Artists. (Note: Founded in 1916, the Society of Independent Artists followed the model of the Parisian Société des Artistes Indépendants in giving anyone the right to participate in its annual exhibitions on payment of a modest fee ($5.00 during the time in which Hutchinson participated). Works were hung alphabetically by artist's name in its annual exhibitions and the alpha starting point for each show was determined by random selection.) In May 1936 she was one of forty New York artists selected to participate in an exhibition of works from the city and each U.S. state. The group was a prestigious one, including Alexander Archipenko, Charles E. Burchfield, Arthur Dove, William Glackens, Harry Gottlieb, Edward Hopper, Walt Kuhn, Georgia O'Keeffe, John Sloan, and Bradley Walker Tomlin. (Note: Hutchinson was chosen to participate in the First National Exhibition of American Art by a committee appointed by the governor of New York State and mayor of New York City. Held on the mezzanine floor of the International Building in Rockefeller Center, the show included forty works from New York artists and one from each of the forty-four states, plus Hawaii, Puerto Rico, the Panama Canal, and the Virgin Islands. In addition to Hutchinson, the New York artists were Alexander Archipenko, Gifford Beal, Arnold Blanch, Lucile Blanch, Ann Brockman, Charles E. Burchfield, C.K. Chatterton, Jon Corbino, John Edward Costigan, Arthur Dove, Guy Pène du Bois, Louis Eilshemius, John Flannagan (sculptor), Donald Forbes, Emil Ganso, William Glackens, Harry Gottlieb, Edward Hopper, C. Paul Jennewein, Mrs. Georgina Klitgaard, Walt Kuhn, Sidney Laufman, Ernest Lawson, Jonas Lie (painter), Luigi Lucioni, Henry Mattson, Henry Lee McFee, Hobart Nichols, Georgia O'Keeffe, Henry Varnum Poor (designer), Ellen Emmet Rand, Charles Rosen, John Sloan, Eugene Speicher, Maurice Sterne, Bradley Walker Tomlin, Carl Walters, and Heinz Warneke.)

Early in 1937 Hutchinson was given a solo exhibition in the mezzanine art gallery of the Barbizon-Plaza hotel. In reviewing the show Howard Devree saw a decade of progress in her paintings as she gradually moved toward "simplification, sureness, subtler color values, inspired by a lively decorative sense." (Note: Devree said the exhibition took place "at the Barbizon." When critics said an exhibition took place "at the Barbizon" they meant the Barbizon-Plaza Hotel. Completed in 1930 the Barbizon-Plaza Hotel at Central Park South between Sixth and Seventh Avenues was an apartment, or residential hotel. It aimed to attract artists, musicians, actors, and other members of the arts community by offering inexpensive rooms and providing studios, concert halls, and similar amenities. Its art gallery, adjacent to a mezzanine, was sometimes called the Mezzanine Gallery (or Galleries). In its advertising, the hotel referred to the gallery as the "Barbizon Petit Palais des Beaux Arts." In the late 1930s the management served after-dinner refreshments in the mezzanine and provided quiet music so guests could sit and observe the lobby below or move about in the adjacent gallery where, its advertising stated, "exhibits of leading European and American artists are shown monthly." The Barbizon-Plaza had a sister hotel, the Barbizon Hotel for Women completed in 1928 and located at 63rd Street and Lexington Avenue. It was also an apartment hotel, but where the Barbizon-Plaza accepted both men and women residents (after considering the references they submitted) the older Barbizon was restricted to women (also accepted only after review of references). In news reports and reviews, like Devree's, either hotel could be called simply "the Barbizon." Readers were expected to understand that when the article referred to an art exhibition the building meant was the Barbizon-Plaza. The Barbizon Hotel for Women had a lounge in which concerts could be performed and it had studios adapted for the use of artists and musicians. It also had a mezzanine in which pictures could be displayed. However it had no art gallery and almost all its public spaces, apart from the lobby, were restricted to women only or, in rooms where men were allowed, a permit had to be obtained.)

Mary E. Hutchinson, "The Duet," circa 1937

Mary E. Hutchinson, "The Composer," circa 1936

Hutchinson showed her painting, "The Duet," in her solo exhibition in the Midtown Gallery in 1937 and showed it again the following year when it won the award mentioned above. On both occasions critics voiced mixed feelings about it. In November 1937 a critic for the New York Sun noted a regrettable "tendency to blackness and hard contours" in it and other portraits of the time and in January 1938 a critic, also from the New York Sun, said it was "boldly conceived" and able to dominate the room in which it was hung, but the couple shown were "so 'posed' that they seem almost to have been frozen into their positions." Later that year the critic, Margaret Breuning, called it a "startling" canvas that "hits you between the eyes at first viewing, but has nothing to say after this first violence of onslaught." Hutchinson showed the painting twice more over the next few years and it attracted enough attention to be reproduced in art journals and newspapers. In a 1940 interview Hutchinson said people failed to see the message she intended it to give. In showing a young couple studying a sheet of music—the man being an African American and the woman a white person—she hoped to convey that "through the arts racial barriers are eliminated." (Note: A critic for the New York Sun, writing in 1938, had failed to recognize that the woman was white. The reporter who interviewed Hutchinson in 1940 wrote: "Rather than painting with a full value range and giving a photographic reproduction, Miss Hutchinson concentrates on arriving at a sculpturesque fullness. She limits third dimension deliberately and thereby intensifies her designs. The canvasses for which she has most affection are built around abstract qualities like 'Sleep' and 'Racial Prejudice.' And speaking of the latter, the picture reproduced here [i.e., 'The Duet'] won a prize, but, Mary suspects, without the judges knowing its real subject. Ostensibly a youth and girl are working over some music. He holds the violin and she the score. The judges thought they were two negroes. But Mary says she may have overdone the sun-tan on the girl's face. Actually she is a white girl. And the picture is supposed to say that through the arts racial barriers are eliminated. She is not advocating intermarriage, just a bit of tolerance and working together.") Hutchinson was working in a federally-funded neighborhood center in Harlem at the time she painted "The Duet." While employed at the center she made other portraits of African Americans as well. These included "The Composer" and "The Composer at His Keyboard" with Luke Theodore Upshure as the model; "Shine Boy" and "George Griffiths" and "George Griffiths Sleeping" with George Griffiths as the model; and one, "Night," where the model's name is not known. (Note: While nothing is known of her other African American subjects, the model for "The Composer" and "The Composer at His Keyboard" was well known. His name was Luke Theodore Upshure. The son of a former slave, he was born in 1885 and was educated at Columbia University, City College of New York, and Cooper Union. Although he earned a living as a janitor in a Greenwich Village apartment building, his real vocation was music. He taught piano and composed solo and orchestral music. He and his wife, Anne McVey (who was white), gave parties which were famous in their time for music, poetry, and political discussion. In an invitation to a party held May 6, 1934, Upshure wrote: "Please, come rest, meditate, make merry a while among friends in an atmosphere of tranquility far removed from the chaotic muddled world with its ghastly hypocrisies and eternal stupidity. It is my desire to give you a musical feast with wholesome music, just a sip of nectar before we are hurled back to the alcoves of the unknown." The American sculptors Arthur Lee and Augusta Savage made busts of him and his portrait was painted by the German, Walter von Ruckteschell, the Frenchman, H.L. Laussucq, and the Austrian, Walter Carnelli, as well as by Hutchinson.)

In 1938 Hutchinson was elected to the board of directors of An American Group Inc. and showed in a thematic exhibition that group put on at Maison Française called "Roofs for 40 million." (Note: La Maison Française was built in 1932 in Rockefeller Center by U.S. and French interests to showcase French commercial exports and culture. A reviewer for The New York Times said the 1938 exhibit contained pictures appropriate to the exhibition's theme: "The pictures ruthlessly expose the evils of old and inadequate housing, crowded tenements and streets, and the miseries of the poor and the unfortunate who are packed together under inhuman conditions.") (Note: A group of six artists established An American Group Inc. in the summer of 1931. It was a cooperative organization which held exhibitions of work by young artists who were not able to obtain representation by the major commercial galleries. In the early part of the decade it held its shows exclusively in the Barbizon-Plaza Hotel and later used a succession of different galleries.) The following year she was one of 250 members of the American Artists Congress to show work in an exhibition called "Art in a Skyscraper" put on at 444 Madison Avenue.

Reporters interviewed Hutchinson in 1937 and 1940. Both times she made light of her career, explaining in the first of them that her great success when young was in playing singles tennis rather than in painting, mentioning her failing grade in a college art course, and lamenting that a prize for work in sculpture while at the National Academy led merely to work "painting flowers on waste baskets." In the second she explained that she could not abide the rigid technical discipline imposed by her college and academy instructors and wanted the freedom to paint portraits from life.

== Artistic career, 1940s and 1950s ==
During the first half of the 1940s Hutchinson continued to exhibit with three membership organizations—the National Association of Women Artists, the New York Society of Women Artists, and the Society of Independent Artists—and she joined and exhibited with a fourth, the League of American Artists. (Note: Hutchinson was a member of the Board of Directors of the Society of Independent Artists in the early 1940s. When interviewed in 1940 she said she strongly believed in the policies of the Independents: "They are the only truly democratic organization in America. And have been the first showing place of so many excellent painters... We've got to take art out of the luxury class and make it vital to every day life." (The reporter gave the society's name as "Independent Painters and Sculptors of America, but gave the society's address correctly.)) (Note: The League of Present Day Artists was an outgrowth of the Bombshell Artists Group. The latter had come into existence in 1942 at the instigation of an art critic and gallery owner, Samuel M. Kootz. In 1941 Kootz had written an inflammatory letter to The New York Times in which he said American artists were overly timid and the times were ripe for a "fresh impulse" to produce a style that displays individuality and that is "vigorous, healthy, and more suitable to his [i.e., the artist's] contemporary ideas." In 1944 the Bombshell Group changed its name to the League of Present Day Artists. The league, like the Bombshell Group, held Annual exhibitions at the Riverside Museum. Artists, particularly painters, sculptors, and printmakers who were "working along new trends in art," were invited to submit works for jury evaluation. and new members were admitted by ballot of all existing members after review of three works. In 1947 its chairman, Leo Quanchi, described the group as a "progressive group of modern painters and sculptors involved in the unselfish purpose of cooperation and assistance to its fellow men and women in the arts, with aims to uncover and bring to the fore new talents otherwise lost in the maelstrom of economic pressure and indifference.") In 1945 the Studio Gallery produced a duo-artist exhibition of drawings by Hutchinson and watercolors by her mother and during the rest of the 1940s she continued to show with membership organizations but did so at a distance since, following the death of her father that year, she had moved from New York back to Atlanta to live with her mother. In 1953 she participated in a group show held by the National Association of Women Artists devoted to works by members from the state of Georgia. Otherwise, in the 1950s and during the rest of her life she taught art in Catholic high schools in Atlanta and rarely showed her work. (Note: In 1950 her work appeared in two solo exhibitions in Atlanta, the Castle Gallery and the West Hunter Street Library.)

== Exhibitions ==
A list of exhibitions is given in a web site called "Artworks of Mary E. Hutchinson" by Jae Turner.

== Art teacher ==
Hutchinson was employed as an artist-teacher and supervisor of teachers in a community art center located in Harlem between 1935 and 1943. (Note: The community art center was part of the Federal Art Project of the Works Progress Administration. Beginning in 1935 the FAP employed out-of-work instructors to teach art in community centers within American cities. Hutchinson's position was technical supervisor of the Art Teaching Staff at the Harlem Community Art Center. The WPA/FAP Art Teaching Division employed teachers to give free art classes to children and adults in community centers such as the one in which Hutchinson worked. In 1936 she gave lectures at a gallery in Macy's department store on "Picture Making by Children" displaying pictures that the children created in these classes.)

On relocating to Atlanta in 1945 and for the rest of the 1940s Hutchinson served on the faculty of the High Museum School of Art and its successor the Atlanta Art Institute. Thereafter she taught in Catholic high schools in Atlanta.

== Personal information ==
Hutchinson's father was Merrill Marquand Hutchinson. He was born in Mexico City in 1874 and died in 1945, in Atlanta. Her mother was Minnie Belle Bradford Hutchinson. She was born in Enfield, New Hampshire, in 1875 and died in 1959. At the time of her father's birth, his father, Merrill N. Hutchinson, and his mother, Mary Louise Trask Hutchinson, were leading a Presbyterian mission in Mexico City. (Note: Both sets of Hutchinson's grandparents had been born in New England (three in New Hampshire and one in Vermont).) Hutchinson's parents were married in Boston, Massachusetts, in September 1905 and she was born in Melrose, Massachusetts, on July 11, 1906. Due to infant fatalities she was raised as an only child. At the time of her birth Merrill was a church organist in New York. (Note: Merrill Hutchinson graduated from the University of Vermont in 1895. While a student there he had served as organist in the university chapel. In 1898 he began work as the principal organist in Christ Episcopal Church. He moved to New York in 1902 to serve as assistant organist at South Church, a Reformed Dutch Church on Madison Avenue at 38th Street, and to study at the Guilmant Organ School, First Presbyterian Church. In 1904 he started as assistant organist at St. George's Episcopal Church on Stuyvesant Square.) In 1908 the family moved to Atlanta where Merrill was both a church organist and director of music in a private school for girls and Minnie Belle, who before her marriage had taught elocution in Boston, was an instructor of voice culture and dramatic expression first in the same school where Merrill worked and later in the school where Hutchinson received her high school education. (Note: After moving to Atlanta Merrill became organist at St. Luke's Episcopal Church. At that time both parents taught at the Woodberry School for Girls, Merrill as director of music and piano instructor and Minnie Belle as instructor of voice culture and dramatic expression. Before her marriage to Merrill, Minnie Belle lived in Boston, studying at the Emerson School of Oratory and teaching elocution to clergymen and other public speakers. Sometime between 1910 and 1914 Merrill left the school to study in Germany and in 1915 returned to Atlanta where he became the organist at First Church of Christ, Scientist and opened a studio to teach keyboard music and pursue a career as concert organist. While he was away Minnie Belle left the Woodbury School to become acting director of the department of Expression and Dramatic Arts at a boarding and day school for girls called Washington Seminary.) By 1930 Merrill had become a practitioner of Christian Science while she remained a teacher of expression. Ten years later they were both self-employed practitioners of that faith, he at the age of 66 and she at 65.

Hutchinson's high school, which she attended between 1920 and 1922, was Washington Seminary (Note: The Washington Seminary was a co-educational day school founded in 1878 by two nieces of George Washington. In 1953 it merged into The Westminster Schools.) While at the seminary Hutchinson developed into a champion tennis player. (Note: In 1922 singles tennis competitions, Hutchinson won the Atlanta Y.W.C.A. championship and was runner-up in the Georgia State Tournament. She told a reporter she had begun playing in 1919 in matches with her father and not long after was able to win the tournament at Washington Seminary.) In 1924 and 1925 Hutchinson studied at the Agnes Scott College in Decatur, Georgia. (Note: Hutchinson's academic performance was evidently not very good since she was listed in the school catalog as a freshman both years. She was said to have spent three years at Agnes Scott College but evidence of a third year is lacking. As previously noted, she told interviewers that she flunked the school's art course.) She lived in New York while studying at the National Academy and remained there during the 1930s and the years of World War II but returned to Atlanta in 1945 after the death of her father. At that time she and her mother rented an apartment and lived together there for the rest of her mother's life. Following her mother's death she continued to live in the same apartment for the rest of her life. Hutchinson never married and from 1931 onward generally shared her life with a succession of women partners.

Other names

Hutchinson's name was usually given as Mary E. Hutchinson. Less frequently it was cited either without the middle initial or in full as Mary Elizabeth Hutchinson. (Note: Examples of the three versions of Hutchinson's name are given in references to this article.)
