= C.K. Chatterton =

American painter (1880–1973)

- C.K. Chatterton, seen at easel in his studio, about 1940
- Born: Clarence Kerr Chatterton; September 19, 1880; Newburgh, New York
- Died: July 1, 1973 (aged 92); New Paltz, New York
- Resting place: Cedar Hill Cemetery, Newburgh, New York

C.K. Chatterton (1880–1973) was an American artist whose oils, watercolors, and gouaches, painted in realist style, showed the houses and streets of villages, towns, and harbors of upstate New York and the Maine coast. Critics said his work possessed directness and candor as well as an ability to capture the play and pattern of light. One of them praised his "power to find in narrow streets with trolley cars and railway culverts something stimulating in design and warm with a sense of human living." His paintings were, another wrote, "smiling without falsification of sentimentality."

Chatterton trained at the New York School of Art under Robert Henri, Walter Appleton Clark, and others. Among his fellow students, Edward Hopper and Gifford Beal became studio mates and friends. He was professor of art at Vassar College for many years. There he taught live drawing along with the more usual techniques of landscape and portraiture in oil and watercolor.

== Early life and training ==
Chatterton was raised in Newburgh, New York, where he attended local public schools through his high school graduation in 1897. (Note: That year he was elected school vice president.) While he was in the elementary grades he obtained grudging approval from his father to attend art classes taught by the artist, Lydia Edgar, in nearby Middletown on the understanding that he would draw and paint as a hobby. (Note: The instructor, Lydia Edgar, was an artist and art teacher who lived in Newburgh where her brother ran a furniture business that had been established by their father. Her advertisements said she taught modern languages as well as drawing and painting. The brother, Grant E. Edgar, was a close acquaintance of Chatterton's father. The two men were prominent members of a local church and both served as superintendents of its Sunday school.) Shortly after approving the classes Chatterton's father died of consumption, leaving an estate large enough to support the remaining family members. On graduating from high school Chatterton decided he would train to be a professional illustrator. In 1900 he enrolled in the New York School of Art where Howard Chandler Christy and Walter Appleton Clark taught classes in illustration. (Note: Walter Appleton Clark (1876-1906) had a short but productive career as illustrator and instructor. He studied and then briefly taught at the Art Students League in New York. Considered to be the equal of famous contemporaries such as Christy and Howard Pyle, his illustrations appeared in late-19th-century magazines and books.) (Note: William Merritt Chase founded the New York School of Art as the Chase School in 1896. It was renamed half way through Chatterton's four years as a student. In 1940 became part of Parsons School of Design and in 1970 that school became part of The New School.) He chose that school partly because, like Lydia Edgar's, its approach was based on working from life. After studying illustration for two years Chatterton began to study painting in watercolor and oil. He said he made the change when his friend and fellow student, Edward Hopper, told him "Chat, it's time you started to paint." At first Chatterton's painting instructors William Merritt Chase, Frank DuMond, Luis Mora, and Kenneth Hayes Miller. Things changed dramatically in 1902 when Robert Henri took DuMond's place and introduced an approach to art that was entirely new to Chatterton. Where before the emphasis had been on visual accuracy in drawing, the new emphasis was on emotional spontaneity. Chatterton said that to Henri "the idea and the emotion were all-important, the manner of conveying them negligible." To a meticulous craftsman like Chatterton this was a revolutionary idea. He said, "To those of us who were technically clever, this was baffling and occasionally galling," but he nonetheless adopted the method as his own. In addition to Hopper, his fellow students at this time included George Bellows, Gifford Beal, Edward Hopper, Guy Pène du Bois, and Rockwell Kent.

Leaving the New York School in 1904, Chatterton returned to Newburgh where he lived with his widowed mother and worked out of a studio that he shared with Gifford Beal. Together the two men painted local street and harbor scenes while earning money by making commercial art for local businesses. (Note: Like Chatterton, Beal had Newburgh roots. As a child he spent summers at an estate owned by his parents and in 1908 he married a Newburgh native, Maud Ramsdell.)

== Career in art ==
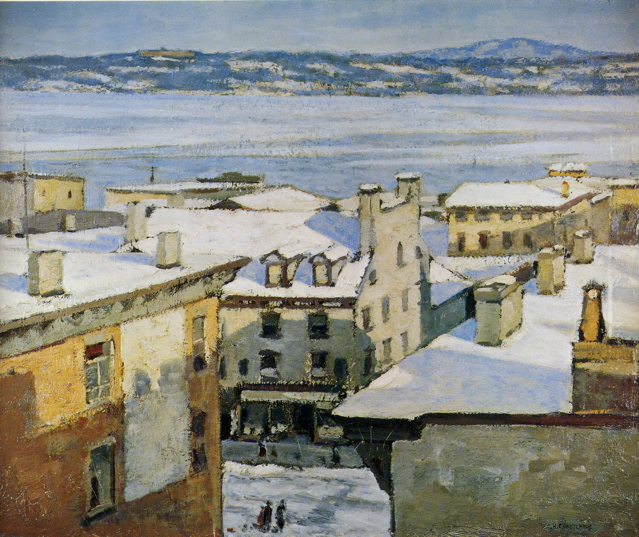
C.K. Chatterton, Snow Clad Town, 1908, oil on canvas, 24 x 30 inches

Unlike most professional artists of his time Chatterton rarely contributed works to group exhibitions in commercial galleries. In 1908 a painting of his called "Snow Clad Town" appeared first in a juried group exhibition at the National Academy of Design and later as part of a traveling exposition held in Argentina and Chile. This painting can be seen at left. When, in 1910, Robert Henri began to arrange group shows in New York's MacDowell Club, Chatterton included his paintings along with those of others of Henri's former students. (Note: The MacDowell shows were non-commercial. Small, self-selected groups of artists decided what works should be hung and no more than one painting could appear in a given season. Chatterton's work appeared again in MacDowell shows of Henri students in 1917 and 1918.) When a painting of his called "A Peep at the Side Show" was included in an exhibition by the American Watercolor Society in 1912, the critic for the New York Herald described it in detail and said it was "a good picture of a not uncommon scene in the rural districts in spring and summer." He showed again at New York Watercolor Club in 1913 and the following year won a prize for best watercolor shown in an exhibition at New York's Salmagundi Club. (Note: The work was a gouache called "The Coal Wharf." The award was the Isidor Prize, named for its donor, club member Joseph Isidor.)

C.K. Chatterton, Henry Weare's Place, about 1920, oil on panel, 24 x 30 inches

There is a gap during the next decade during which there are no records of exhibitions in which Chatterton participated. In that time he married, took up teaching positions, and was employed as a superintendent of art education in the Newburgh public school system. Early on, he spent summer holidays in a rented studio in Newburgh where he made large paintings of the city's street scenes. Later—beginning in 1919—he began to spend summers in the summer resort and art colony of Ogunquit, Maine. This marked a change in his choice of subjects. Where before he mostly painted street and harbor scenes on the Hudson River in the vicinity of Newburgh, he now began to find subjects in the villages on the coast of southern Maine. Chatterton's painting, "Henry Wear's Place," of about 1920 (shown at right) is an example of his early work in Maine. When it was shown in 1927, Margaret Breuning of the New York Evening Post said "'Henry Weare's Place' with its beautiful elm, and umbrageous fountain spreading its beneficence over the little frame house huddling close to its great trunk, reveals the newer, mellower vein that this artist is developing with no loss of power in statement or design."

In 1925 Chatterton convinced the Wildenstein Gallery to mount a solo exhibition of his work and the following year the gallery included his painting "Clinton Square, Newburgh" in a group of representative American paintings in a traveling exhibition that toured Europe and South America. (Note: The New York branch of the international Wildenstein group was run by Georges Wildenstein's brother, Felix, from 1925 until his death in 1952. Like its European counterparts, the New York branch specialized in European works. It was unusual for it to give a solo exhibition to an American artist.) When Wildenstein gave him a second solo exhibition in 1927 Margaret Breuning said his works were ""stimulating in design and warm with a sense of human living" A critic for the Brooklyn Daily Eagle added, "What Edward Hopper has done for the mansard roof of architecture of the 80's, Chatterton has accomplished for the early American homestead."

Later that year Chatterton began a relationship with a gallery owner that would persist for the remainder of the gallery owner's life. The owner was Robert Macbeth and the gallery bore his name. (Note: The Macbeth Gallery was founded in 1892, making it one of the oldest in the country. From the first its owners aimed to show that American art was not inferior to European. In 1908 it produced a group exhibition based on a group of Henri students that came to be known as "The Eight" or "The Ashcan School." Although Chatterton was a member of the later, similarly produced, show at the MacDowell Club, he did not participate in this show. In 1924, Robert Macbeth, who had taken over the gallery on the death of his father, moved the business to spacious new quarters on 57th Street in Manhattan and a few years later he and Chatterton established their longstanding personal and business relationship.) Macbeth, who was a staunch supporter of American artists like Chatterton, had little respect for European modernist influences in American art. Calling these influences "bizarre and unintelligible," he said the American public could be relied upon to choose art that was worthwhile over art that was "merely amusing." Over the nine years from 1929 to 1938 Chatterton showed paintings in four solo and three group shows at Macbeth. (Note: The solo shows took place in 1929, 1931, 1934, and 1936 and the group shows in 1932, 1935, 1938, and 1940.) Although he stopped showing in commercial galleries after Macbeth's death in 1940, his work continued to be shown in noncommercial exhibitions in New York and across the country. In 1936 he was one of 40 artists chosen to represent New York City in a national exhibition of American art that was held in the newly completed International Building of Rockefeller Center. In that year and two others his paintings were included in group shows of the Carnegie International in Pittsburgh. He showed at the annual exhibition of American art at the Art Institute of Chicago (1936), the large and successful Municipal Art Exhibit in New York (1936), the Albany Institute of History and Art (1939), the Golden Gate International Exposition in San Francisco (1940), and the Corcoran Gallery in Washington (1935, 1941, and 1943). During the early 1940s Chatterton participated in a number of group exhibitions and one solo exhibition held by the Dutchess County Art Association. (Note: In 1934 a Poughkeepsie artist, Thomas Barrett, founded the Dutchess County Art Association to provide a gathering place for local artists and to stage exhibitions of their work. The members elected Chatterton president in 1940. The association continues today as the Barrett Art Center in a historic building called Barrett House in Poughkeepsie.) Vassar College, where he was professor of art, gave him exhibitions during the same period and in 1947 mounted a major retrospective of works from his own holdings, holdings of private collectors, and the Brooklyn Museum. The following year he was given another retrospective, this one, sponsored by the Hudson River Conservation Society, featured his 1918 painting, "Clinton Square, Newburgh." Further retrospective exhibitions occurred in 1959 (at the Bethlehem Art Gallery, Salisbury Mills, N.Y.) and 1963 (at Vassar College).

In 1965, for the first time since 1936, his paintings were shown in a Manhattan commercial gallery. George Chapellier, owner of the gallery that bore his name, gave Chatterton a solo exhibition consisting of 50 paintings and drawings dating from 1899 to 1958. Remarkably, 25 works were sold during the first week of the show. (Note: George Chapellier had established the gallery in 1934 and kept it running until his death in 1978. Like Macbeth he specialized exclusively in works by American artists. Born in Belgium in 1890, he was known as an art restorer and collector as well as dealer.)

After Chatterton's death in 1978 he was given exhibitions at the Robert Rice Gallery in Houston, Texas, (1977), Barrett House in Poughkeepsie (1982), and the ACA Gallery in New York (1989 and 1999). (Note: The ACA Gallery was founded in 1932 by Herman Baron together with artists, Stuart Davis, Adolf Dehn, and Yasuo Kuniyoshi. Baron ran it until his death in 1961 when Jeffrey Bergen took over ownership. ACA stood for American Contemporary Arts, a name that indicates the orientation of the gallery.)

=== Artistic style and critical reception ===
One thing that can be said about art is that there's too much said about it. I paint sunlight, blue skies and houses because I like them.

Chatterton shared a common point of view with the men who were students with him at the New York School of Art. They rejected what they saw as unrealistic impressionism and what they considered to be lifeless academic realism. He did not, however, share with them a tendency to show the underside of life in New York City. In this he followed one of Henri's precepts: "Do not imitate; be yourself." If he chose not to show urban grittiness, he also chose not to show empty landscapes. Instead he depicted small-town architecture, work-a-day streets and harbors, and, as often as not, people at their ease. Early in his career a critic praised Chatterton for his "fresh vision of the world, his power to find in narrow streets with trolley cars and railway culverts something stimulating in design and warm with a sense of human living" and credited him with the "power to impose formal discipline upon the most refractory of factual motifs and give them coherent harmony of organization and relevance." Another said he possessed a strong, forthright technique and praised his sentiment of place, taking "the white houses, the tall elms and dusty streets of New England towns as the important things in a picture."

C.K. Chatterton, Girl by the Pond, about 1925, oil on canvas, 28 x 36 inches

C.K. Chatterton, The Poplar (Ogunquit, Maine), about 1947, watercolor, 13 1/2 x 19 inches

Writing in 1934 of that year's solo exhibition at the Macbeth Gallery, the critic for the Brooklyn Daily Eagle noted this sense of place and said Chatterton's point of view was "characterized by certain serene enjoyment of actualities that amounts almost to a philosophy of life." He also wrote that Chatterton's "manner of setting down his reactions has the integrity of his point of view which is characterized by directness and candor." (Note: The critic added: "His pictures of New England villages and streets, of meadows and trees and white meeting houses induce something of the same reaction that one gets from reading Thoreau and Emerson.") A year later another critic noted Chatterton's skill in rendering "the homey quality of small-town life" and remarked on the feeling of peace and quiet he was able to evoke. Writing of a solo exhibition held in 1963 a critic noted another aspect of his style, writing that he was famous for his skill in capturing the play and pattern of light. Although Chatterton's best-known subjects were houses and harbors, he frequently showed figures in either village or (as shown at left) rural scenes. Similarly, although his oil paintings were highly regarded, he was also credited with skill in gouache and (as shown at right) watercolor.

== Art teacher ==
On leaving the New York School of Art in 1904 Chatterton returned to his childhood home Newburgh where he continued to paint. Not long after the first exhibition of his work in 1908, he obtained employment as an art instructor in a private school near his home. In 1915, against advice from his New York friends but with encouragement from Robert Henri, he took a job as artist-in-residence at Vassar College and in the same year was appointed superintendent of art education in Newburgh public schools. Studio art classes were not then the norm in liberal arts classes and Chatterton's differed from others in having students paint from life in the way he himself had been trained. (Note: Late in life Chatterton's daughter recorded his reminiscences of this time. In them he said, "When I went to Vassar College in 1915 as Artist-in-Residence, most of my friends said, "That's the end of Chatterton as a painter." A few years later, many of them were looking for similar positions. Henri was genuinely interested in me going to Vassar and wrote a glowing letter of recommendation for me. And, when I was at the college and in charge of exhibitions, he furnished me with several works, carefully selected, to be hung, as he specified, "by you alone.") When, in 1919, Vassar began giving course credit for the art classes he taught, a member of the faculty complained, he later said, that the school "might as well give credit for plumbing." After he began spending summers in Ogunquit he began teaching classes there. In 1919, while still retaining his position at Vassar, Chatterton was promoted as head of a new department of industrial art in the Newburgh high school. He gave up this job some years before he received appointment as Vassar's professor of art in 1928. By 1933 the courses he taught at the college included life drawing and painting, portraiture, composition, and landscape. He continued teaching there until his retirement in 1948.

== Personal life and family ==
Chatterton's father was Charles L. Chatterton (1853–1893). He was a partner in the Newburgh law firm of Round & Chatterton. He died aged 40 of consumption. Chatterton's mother was Julia Lendrum Chatterton (1858–1934). She was the organist at Newburgh's Calvary Presbyterian Church. In 1915 Chatterton married Margaret A. Meakim (1888–1968). She, like her mother-in-law was an organist. A Poughkeepsie native, she received musical training at the New York Institute of Musical Art and during the 1920s and 1930s and until the outbreak of World War II she performed in services and in concerts at Newburgh's Trinity Methodist Church. The couple had one child, a daughter named Julia, born in 1917 or 1918. In 1945 she married J.M. Van De Water, who was then serving in the Navy on convoy duty in the North Atlantic. She had previously been a teacher in a private school in Baltimore, then an editor on H. L. Mencken's American Mercury magazine, and subsequently a freelance editor.

Chatterton was unostentatious and possessed a quiet and retiring demeanor. Students, who called him "Chatty," saw him as kindly and sympathetic.

At the time of his death Chatterton was living in Poughkeepsie. He died on July 1, 1973, in a nursing home in New Paltz and was buried in Cedar Hill Cemetery, Newburgh.
