= Chamberlin-Johnson-DuBose =

Department store in Atlanta, Georgia

The Chamberlin-Johnson-DuBose Company was a leading department store in Atlanta from 1866 until 1931, competing with Rich's.

The original store was located on the east side of Whitehall St. (now Peachtree St. SW), south of Hunter St. (now King Blvd.). That block is now the location of the Fulton County Government Center.

In May 1918 the store moved "exactly 60 paces south" to new five-story building. The J.M. High Company (a.k.a. High's Department Store, benefactors of today's High Museum of Art) took over the space.

The store filed for bankruptcy in 1930 and closed the next year.
