= Luke Theodore Upshure =

American composer

- Luke Theodore Upshure by Arthur Lee, bronze, 1928
- Born: December 28, 1885; New York, US
- Died: March 1969
- Resting place: Cemetery of the Evergreens, Brooklyn, New York
- Spouse: Anne McVey

Luke Theodore Upshure (1885–1969) was a disabled musician, composer, and music teacher who lived in New York's Greenwich Village. The son of a former slave, he received musical training at the Institute of Musical Art, a forerunner of the Juilliard School, as well as formal education at Columbia University, City College of New York, and the Rand School of Social Science. Although he earned his living doing menial jobs, music was his real vocation. He performed on and taught piano and composed for that instrument, voice, and orchestra. Believing in cultural attainment as an antidote to the social evils of his time, he hosted colorblind parties for artists, actors, musicians, and writers that featured readings, performances, and political discussion as well as dancing, food, and drink. Artists of his time captured his likeness in paintings and sculptures and one contemporary author has described him as a famous African-American entertainer.

== Early life and education ==
Upshure was the youngest of three children born to Luke Upshure and Elizabeth West Upshure. (Note: For information about Upshure's siblings see the section below on parents and immediate family.) Born with a physical disability which affected his hands, many doubted his ability to succeed as a professional musician. He attended DeWitt Clinton High School while it was still new and subsequently continued to live with his mother on Cornelia Street while working as a porter in a retail store. In 1915, when he was 29, he began taking voice lessons in classes at the Institute of Musical Art, a school that was organized by the prominent educator and choral conductor Frank Damrosch, and he continued there part-time until 1921. (Note: The son of a famous composer and brother of an equally famous conductor, Frank Damrosch devoted his life to the teaching of music to students who could not afford private classes. Influenced by the teachings of Felix Adler and the Society for Ethical Culture that Adler founded, Damrosch accepted everyone who wished to learn musical notation and sight reading into voice classes he conducted, first at Cooper Union and later at the Institute of Musical Art in Morningside Heights which he established in 1905. The classes were extremely popular, including many African Americans. For a small sum (ten cents per session) women over the age of 16 and men over 18—regardless of race, ethnicity, or national origin—could receive voice training from qualified teachers at locations around Manhattan. Beginning students were accepted without interview or examination. From elementary classes they could progress to advanced class and subsequently might become members of the People's Choral Union where they would participate in concert performances and study works by George Frideric Handel and other choral masters. Upshure's entry in Who's who in Colored America says that he studied under Damrosch at Cooper Union. However, the connection between Cooper Union and Damrosch's Institute of Musical Art were both temporary and informal. There is no evidence that Damrosch taught at Cooper Union or that Upshure was a student there.) A year later he registered as a student at Columbia University and studied there, specializing in Sociology, until the spring of 1918. Over the next two years he studied economics, philosophy, and literature at City College of New York and from 1921 to 1923 took the general course at the Rand School of Social Science. (Note: Frank Damrosch's mentor, Felix Adler, was a professor at Columbia while Upshure was a student there but there is no evidence that Upshure took any of Adler's classes. In Upshure's time, City College of New York offered free post-secondary education to all of New York's adult males. The Rand School of Social Science, located near Union Square, was under attack during the period Upshure attended its classes for its radical agenda and socialist teaching. Although its main purpose was to train political activists, it was then mainly teaching traditional academic subjects.) While he was studying music and traditional academic subjects Upshure continued to work in menial jobs as porter or caretaker. (Note: U.S. Census records for 1910 and 1920 list Upshure's occupation as porter in a store. In 1915 he placed a want ad in the New York Herald seeking an evening job and a year later he sought a job in a publishing house or law office.) When he completed formal studies Upshure was 37 years old.

== Locale ==
14–16 Cornelia Street, Manhattan, 1932

Upshure's reported home addresses were all within a few blocks of Washington Square in Greenwich Village. Beginning in the middle of the nineteenth century, the district increasingly attracted a diverse mix of residents, including both wealthy and indigent families as well as a growing population of artists, writers, and other creative individuals. Until about 1900, the section below Washington Square was dominated first by African Americans and later by Italian immigrants living in tenement houses and poorly maintained frame buildings while the northern section consisted mainly of fine single-family townhouses and upscale apartments. During the twentieth century Greenwich Village grew into what one writer calls "a vibrant community of working-class immigrants and artists" known for "intense cultural exchange and creativity," progressive politics, and acceptance of cultural attitudes that were elsewhere stigmatized as "bohemian."

In 1900 Upshure lived with his mother Elizabeth and his sister Marselina in a district that had become known as "Little Africa." Their home was an apartment in the rear part of a crowded brick tenement at 11 Cornelia Street. Upshure's mother, then 43, and his sister, aged 16, worked as laundresses, while Upshure, 14, was a doorman. (Note: In 1900 there were sixty-seven residents at 11 Cornelia Street, all of them African-American. Those old enough to work were mostly in menial occupations (laundresses, if women, and day laborers, office boys, stable men, or elevator operators, if men). The building, which had five stories above ground and a basement, provided an average of about fifteen square feet of floor space to each resident.) By 1910 he and his mother had moved to a neighboring and similar building at 15 Cornelia Street. She was still a laundress and he a porter in a retail store. (Note: Constructed in the middle of the nineteenth century 15 Cornelia Street was a brick tenement building of four stories and no basement. As with its neighbor down the street, all its tenants were African-Americans.) Five years later Upshure and his mother were living across the street in a relatively small wood frame house at 16 Cornelia Street. They continued to live there until Elizabeth Upshure died in 1924. (Note: The record for Elizabeth Upshure's death, which gives her name as "Mary E. Upshure," correctly identifies her mother as "Lizzie West.") (Note: Public records show that Upshure and his mother were at 16 Cornelia Street continuously between 1915 and 1920. The U.S. Census for 1910, classified ads placed in 1915 and 1916, the 1916 New York State Census, Columbia University student directories, Upshure's draft registration card of 1917, and the U.S. Census for 1920 all show Upshure and his mother living at that address.) (Note: Sixteen Cornelia Street was one of two small wood frame houses sitting side by side on a block near the intersection of 6th Avenue and West 4th Street that consisted mainly of larger brick apartment buildings and commercial establishments. Both buildings had three stories above street level and basements below. Photographs taken in 1900 and 1933 show them to have been little changed in that period. In 1920 the building at 16 Cornelia held six tenants, four single occupants along with Upshure and his mother. All but one were African Americans. (The exception was a woman named Jane Davis, born in England to English parents, who was married to a man named Orlando Davis.) The other occupants included a widowed man of 65 who had no job; a man of 52, married but living apart from his wife, working as a stable man; Jane Davis 31, having no job, and Orlando Davis, 33, a house painter.) In 1915 he was working as a porter and she continued as a laundress. That year Upshure enrolled at Columbia College and tried to find a part-time evening job to help pay expenses while he was in daytime classes. In 1924 the building in which Upshure and his mother were living was sold. The following year he gave his address as 10 West 8th Street. (Note: The pair of buildings at 14 and 16 Cornelia Street were sold to the owner of a commercial establishment, J. Lamb Ecclesiastical Art Works, located behind the two houses. Once the houses had been demolished, the owners of the Waverly Theater, which succeeded the Lamb studio, used the place for emergency exits.) That address was the location of the Whitney Studio Club, an attached pair of town houses that Gertrude Vanderbilt Whitney, with her assistant, Juliana Force had remodeled into a studio-gallery. (Note: In 1907 Whitney obtained a stable located behind the 8th Street townhouses and turned it into a studio where she could make sculpture. Six years later she bought the townhouse at 8 West 8th Street for use as galleries and offices. She acquired the lease on the other townhouse, at 10 West 8th Street in 1923, and opened the Whitney Studio Club. Two years later she obtained the adjacent building at 14 West 8th Street and in 1930 she had the three buildings transformed into the Whitney Museum of American Art.) Upshure's friend, the African American painter, Beauford Delaney lived in the building a few years later and served as its janitor. At another time Upshure, too, served as a resident janitor and it can be supposed that he acted in the same role while living at the Whitney Studio Club. By 1927 he had moved to 124 Waverly Place and by 1930 to another similar place down the block at 106 Waverly Place. It was in the latter location that he lived rent-free and served as janitor. The building had seven other occupants, two lodgers and a family of five. (Note: The building at 124 Waverly Place was a townhouse built early in the nineteenth century originally of three stories and a basement and in the 1920s having a fourth story. It was the last building on the west end of the block, next to a parking lot and near the 6th Avenue subway station. In 1930 it had twelve occupants, four married couples without children, one woman with daughter and son, and one single man. They were all white. One was a retired Army officer. The others were unemployed spouses or children, or employed in jobs such as decorator, dry cleaner, insurance agent, and lawyer. The building had no resident janitor at that time. Neighboring buildings did have janitors who lived rent free.) (Note: The building at 106 Waverly had five stories and a basement. Located on the end of the block closest to Washington Square, it was somewhat more elegant than the building at 124 Waverly. In 1930 it held a family—man, wife, and two adult sons, one of them married—and two lodgers, both single women in their 30s, one an insurance clerk, the other a private nurse. The man and wife were unemployed. Their two grown sons were both theatrical musicians. The wife of the married son sold Japanese art for a living.) Upshure's last known address appears on his World War II draft registration card of 1942. It shows him to be living at 647 Broadway. Because that building was entirely devoted to commerce, where there were no residential quarters, he was either using this as an address of convenience or, more likely, was living there illicitly. (Note: The building at 647 Broadway was constructed in the mid-nineteenth century as storefront at street level with four floors of lofts above. When new, it was the location of a well-known restaurant called Pfaff's which lay below ground level in a vault that extended under the sidewalk. The building remained in commercial use into the twentieth century. Returns from the U.S. Census of 1940 give evidence that he was an illicit resident because census takers listed no residents for the building (or others near it) and because there is no report of him elsewhere in that census.)

== Later life ==
During the 1930s Upshure was known for the parties he hosted. In an invitation to a party held May 6, 1934, Upshure wrote: "Please, come rest, meditate, make merry a while among friends in an atmosphere of tranquility far removed from the chaotic muddled world with its ghastly hypocrisies and eternal stupidity. It is my desire to give you a musical feast with wholesome music, just a sip of nectar before we are hurled back to the alcoves of the unknown."

In 1927 he hosted a reception in honor of New Masses editor, Mike Gold, and playwright, Em Jo Basshe, whose play, Earth, was currently on stage at the New Playwrights Theatre on 52nd Street. A report in the Pittsburgh Courier said the entire company of the play attended the party along with Augusta Savage and "the usual Village aggregation of artists and writers." The entertainment for the evening included an exotic dancer from the Village, songs written and sung by Will Anthony Madden, and performances by members of the cast. (Note: For information about Mike Gold, Em jo Basshe, and Augusta Savage see their Wikipedia entries.) (Note: Will Anthony Madden (1884–1977) was an African American poet, dramatic artist, short story writer, sports columnist, and professional basketball team manager who in 1959 was declared poet laureate of Greenwich Village.) (Note: New Playwrights Theatre was founded by Mike Gold and Em Jo Basshe along with John Dos Passos and John Howard Lawson with the objective of producing "mass plays, done for workers at prices that workers can afford." Set in the American South in the late nineteenth century, Basshe's play, Earth focused on a conflict between Christianity and Voodoo superstitions as experienced by a woman whose six children have all died. One reviewer saw the play as a radicalized version of the Book of Job.) The following week many of the same people showed up at his place, surprising him, a society reporter said, by "appearing with all the makings of a party." (Note: In addition to those from the earlier party the guests included Caska Bond, the "American representative of the Novello Davies system of voice culture;" Jules Bledsoe, a popular singer of opera and musical theater; Arthur Hamilton, professional saxophone performer; Maurice Becker, radical artist and magazine illustrator; Mae Robinson Jackson, a prominent African American businesswoman; Grayce Cunningham Lezama, likewise a prominent African American businesswoman; James E. Fladger, officer of the Alpha Gamma Lambda graduate chapter of the Alpha Phi Alpha collegiate fraternity;) In August 1929 he hosted a party to honor Augusta Savage who had recently received a grant to study art in Paris. The grant was made by the philanthropist, Julius Rosenwald through the auspices of the executive secretary of the National Urban League, Eugene Kinckle Jones. Performers for the evening included the poet, Will Anthony Madden; singer, Gertrude Fayde; artist, Earle Sweeting; and Upshure himself. (Note: Gertrude Fayde was a singer, performer in Broadway productions, and producer of musical performances. During the late 1920s and early 1930s she managed the Club Fujiyama on St. Nicholas Avenue and later the Maison Fayde on St. Nicholas Avenue in Harlem.) A news account of the event mentioned that guests included artists and writers from both races (African-American and white). (Note: Guests included Faustina Trimble, commercial artist and designer; Olivia Ward Bush-Banks, poet and journalist; Henrietta Cachemaille, Harlem socialite and civic leader; Elizabeth H. Davis, official at Grace Church of Harlem; Jimmie Harris, versatile musician and night club performer; Edgar Grey, public lecturer and editor of the Harlem Home Journal published by the Harlem Business Men's Club; and Elmer C. Stoner, a commercial illustrator.)

The journalist and humorist, H. Allen Smith, included an anecdote about an aspect of Upshure's parties in his best-selling book, Low Man on a Totem Pole (Garden City, N.Y., Doubleday, Doran & Co., 1941). "Luke Theodore Upshure," he wrote, "was janitor of an apartment house on Waverly Place. He was an aging Negro with twisted, crippled hands but he was educated and something of an artist. He lived in the basement of the building where he worked and it was his custom to put aside all liquor bottles thrown out by the tenants until he had accumulated enough to sell to a junk dealer. With the money these bottles brought in Luke Theodore Upshure would then purchase liquor bottles with liquor in them and hurl a soiree." The piece continues with a description of a woman at one of Upshure's parties who makes two attempts to recite a very long poem that she had composed and another of a well-known aviator, Hubert Julian, known as the "Black Eagle."

Upshure posed as the model for two sculptures and four oil portraits. Augusta Savage made a bust of him as did Arthur Lee and his portrait was painted by the German, Walter von Ruckteschell, the Frenchman, H.L. Laussucq, the Austrian, Walter Carnelli, and an American, Mary E. Hutchinson. (Note: Savage made her sculpture of Upshure shortly after her return from Paris in 1931. The bust gained her membership in the National Association of Women Painters and Sculptors. She was the first African American to be elected to that group.)

During the 1930s and 1940s Upshure performed at musical events. In 1929 he appeared in a musical and literary event at the Gumby Book Studio Group (Note: The Gumby Book Studio Group staged performances in a bookstore that he managed on 5th Avenue. Aiming to foster interracial understanding and advance African American culture, L. S. Alexander Gumby collected and organized news clippings on matters involving African Americans. In addition to Upshure's, performances on this occasion included a recital by the baritone, Cecil Burrows; and performances on the piano by Garet Anderson and Ruth Paull.) and two years later in an "Art Ball" to raise money to help Gumby recover from the economic ravages of the Great Depression and from a bout of pneumonia both of which had forced him to close his bookstore and put the well-known archival collections he had assembled into storage. (Note: Gumby was a clerk in a Manhattan post office who assembled and organized his archives as time permitted. The Art Ball was held at the Renaissance Casino in Harlem. Upshure was one of the organizers of the benefit. Others included society reporter, Geraldyn Dismond; Rose McClendon of Rose McClendon Players; Samuel Allen, jazz pianist; and Hubert Delany, civil rights lawyer.) In 1942 he appeared at the Harlem Recreation Center in a show put on for American servicemen. In addition to Upshure, the bill included Joe Sullivan, jazz pianist and Zero Mostel, comedian and actor, both performers from the Greenwich Village nightclub, Café Society.

== Parents and immediate family ==
Upshure's father was Luke Upshure, born about 1847 on the Eastern Shore of Maryland. His mother was Elizabeth West Upshure, almost certainly born to parents who were slaves. (Note: Upshure's mother was almost certain to have been born into slavery because the number of slaves was very large in the area in which she was born and the number of "free blacks" was very small. Until the end of the American Civil War the Arkansas Delta region was dominated by large cotton plantations worked by slave labor. Fearing slave insurrections during the 1850s, the state had voted to expel virtually all of its free African-American population. The United States Census for 1910 states that Elizabeth West's father was born in Virginia and her mother in Arkansas.) Luke and Elizabeth were married in New York on December 11, 1880. (Note: Luke Upshure was listed as "Black" in the record of his marriage. His parents were J. Casters Upshure and Grace Western Upshure.) She died in 1924. In addition to Luke Theodore, they had two children who survived infancy, Walter Eli and Marselina Elizabeth. (Note: Walter Eli was born in New York in 1881. Marselina Elizabeth was born in New York in 1884. She earned her living as a laundress, married Herbert Williams in 1907, and died in 1923, all in that city.) Two others died young. (Note: The U.S. Census for 1900 lists Elizabeth Upshure as the mother of four children, two of whom then remained living.)

At the time of Upshure's birth his father was 33 and his mother 29. Public records show that Upshure lived with both parents and then solely with his mother until he was in his early 30s. (Note: The United States Census for 1910 lists Elizabeth Upshure as head of a household that included herself and Luke Theodore. She was then 50 years old, living at 16 Cornelia Street in Greenwich Village, and earning her living as a laundress in a commercial laundry. A classified ad, placed in 1895 by "a respectable colored man" living on West 61st Street and named Upshure, suggests that Upshure's father was living apart from the family at that time. When Elizabeth Upshure's daughter, Marselina, died in 1923, she was living at the same address and, like her mother, earning her living as a laundress.) Upshure was married to Anne McVey. The date of their marriage is not known and it may not have been registered. It is likely to have occurred after the death of Upshure's mother in 1924 when he was in his 40s and she in her late 30s. She was raised in Missouri by a father who was, she said, "a real radical" and, as an adult, her own social and political outlook was a decidedly radical one They met in New York where both lived in Greenwich Village and she directed plays for a living. Press accounts that mention both Upshure and McVey do not refer to them as a married couple but rather as separate individuals.

Other names

Upshure called himself and was usually called Luke Upshure but sometimes Theodore Upshure and sometimes Luke Theodore Upshure. Friends referred to him as Theo.
