= Joseph Madison High =

American businessman (1855–1906)

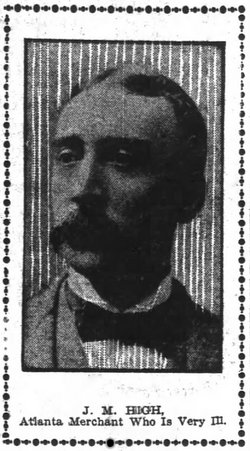
J. M. High

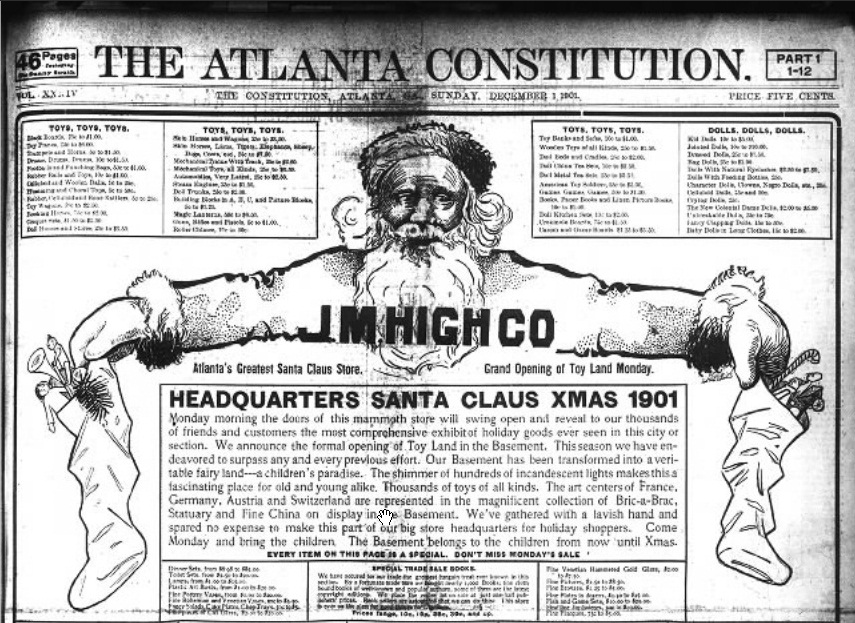
1901 newspaper ad for the High dept. store

Joseph Madison High (1855–1906) was the founder of Atlanta department store J.M. High Company. His wife, Harriet "Hattie" Harwell Wilson High (1862–1932), donated her family's mansion on Peachtree Street to house the museum that has grown into the High Museum of Art, Atlanta's foremost art museum.

Madison was from Morgan County, Georgia. He started his first business in Madison, Georgia, forming the firm of High & Berney. He later moved to Atlanta for greater opportunity, where he partnered with E. D. Herring to open up a dry goods store at 40 Whitehall Street (now Peachtree St. SE). A new store opened at 50 Whitehall in 1882. In 1884 High bought out Herring and renamed the firm J. M. High & Co.

In 1882 High married Harriet Harwell Wilson.

In 1887 High's department store opened a new location on the west side of Whitehall. By 1889 High was able to buy the southwest corner of Whitehall and Hunter (now King Blvd.) and erect a four-story brick building with an ornate interior for his department store.

In 1906 High died. but the store continued doing business.
