= Oronzo =

Oronzo is an Italian personal name, derived from the Latin Orontius.

It can refer to:

- Saint Oronzo (Orontius)
- Oronzo Vito Gasparo, American artist
- Don Oronzo Squarciafico Pinelli Ravaschieri Fieschi, 5th Prince of Belmonte
- Oronzo Pugliese, Italian football manager
- Oronzo Reale, Italian politician
