= Onya La Tour =

Art collector, dealer, and museum founder

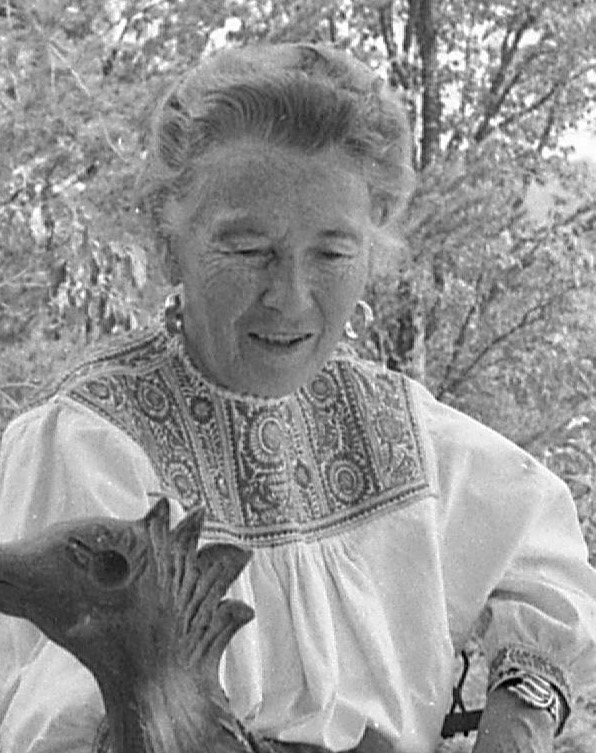
- Onya La Tour in 1963 (age 67)
- Born: April 7, 1896; Salem, Indiana
- Died: June 2, 1976 (aged 80); Greenwood, Indiana
- Occupations: Art collector and dealer; artists' model.
- Known for: Advocacy for Modernism

Onya La Tour (1896–1976) was an American art collector and dealer, artists' model, manager of art galleries in Puerto Rico, New York City, and Indiana, and an advocate for modernism and the appreciation of modern art. In the 1930s to 1960s, La Tour acquired hundreds of paintings and graphic art works by modernist artists, many of whom later became notable. During the Great Depression, she was Director of the Federal Art Gallery in New York City, which supported artists under the auspices of the Work Projects Administration. She also operated her own private Onya LaTour Gallery in New York. In 1939, she brought her collection of more than 400 works of art from New York City to the artists colony in rural Brown County, Indiana, where she founded a short-lived Indiana Museum of Modern Art (see #Homes). From 1948 to the 1960s, she designed and built three unusual and creative homes where she displayed her collection, often inviting diverse groups of people to mingle and experience modern art. In 1972, a few years before her death at age 80, she donated over 100 paintings and graphic art works as well as her lifetime collection of papers to the Indianapolis Museum of Art, where an exhibit of selections from her collection took place October–April, 2014. La Tour was "a woman of contradiction and mystery, some of which she created herself" and "a woman ahead of her time". "While Onya, strictly speaking, was not an artist, her life was her art."

== Biography ==
=== Early life ===
La Tour was born Ona Alberta Tarr to Simon Wesley Tarr and Elva Ethel Hardin Tarr of Washington, Indiana. Ona had a difficult childhood. Her father was a heavy drinker and abusive. Ona left home at age 14. Her mother had separated from her father sometime earlier. She lived for a time with her father in Montana, and then with her step-mother and half brother (see Alva La Toor below) in Oklahoma. Simon Tarr sometimes may have used the names Toor or LaToor. It is not known when Ona adopted the name Onya La Tour (also sometimes given as Onya LaTour). In a 1940 newspaper article, her first name was consistently Ona and her last name La Tour or LaTour.

La Tour attended Graceland College in Lamona, Iowa, where she met Albro Latimer Kellock, whom she married in 1920. In 1921, they homesteaded 160 acres near Spokane, Washington. La Tour's adopted daughter Manya was born in Hollywood, California in January, 1926. After five years there, a forest fire destroyed their home, and they moved to Seattle, Washington. There, La Tour developed a circle of artist friends and began to collect art. Her home became a gathering place for "architects, writers, musicians and 'revolutionaries' in all the arts".

In the 1930s, La Tour traveled extensively in Europe. She had a close relationship with artist Arnold Franz Brasz, with whom she shared a studio in the Beechwood area of Hollywood, California. She sat as an artist's model for many artists (see #Art Portraits of Onya La Tour).

In 1935, La Tour moved to Puerto Rico with Antonio Colorado, where she directed a gallery.

=== New York City ===
Later in 1935, La Tour moved from Puerto Rico to New York City. There she became friends with many later prominent artists, operated several galleries (see next section), and acquired hundreds of artworks, often directly from the artists. From 1936 to 1939, La Tour had a romantic relationship with Maurice Jungbeck. They lived at 596 Riverside Drive, New York City, which also housed the Onya La Tour Gallery (see #Galleries). "As a result of occasional disputes with Jungbeck, Onya began to spend some time in Indianapolis [Indiana] in 1938 and 1939."

=== Galleries ===
La Tour owned and/or operated the following art galleries.

- 1935, an art gallery in Puerto Rico. La Tour claimed that this was the first gallery in Puerto Rico to exhibit modern art.
- 1936–1937: La Tour directed the Federal Art Gallery of the Federal Arts Project of the Work Projects Administration, 225 W 57th St, New York NY. There were numerous posters announcing exhibits at this gallery.

"The WPA program made no distinction between representational and nonrepresentational art. Abstraction had not yet gained favor in the 1930s and 1940s and, thus, was virtually unsalable. As a result, the Federal Art Project supported such iconic artists as Jackson Pollock before their work could earn them income." Quoted from Federal Art Project#Background.

- 1937–1939: Onya La Tour Gallery, 596 Riverside Drive (Harlem), New York NY, opened October 22, 1937. A poster for this gallery can be viewed online. La Tour claimed that this was the first gallery in the US to specialize in abstract art.
- 1939: 25 West 8th Street, New York City, no further information. Possibly this Gallery was established after La Tour stopped living with Maurice Jungbeck at 596 Riverside Drive. This region of Greenwich Village was a vibrant art scene in the 1930s.
- 1940–47: Indiana Museum for Modern Art, Brown County, Indiana. La Tour purchased this property in October, 1939, and opened the Museum in summer of 1940. It was located between Nashville Indiana and Columbus Indiana. She sold the property in Fall, 1947.

La Tour's subsequent homes Spellbound House, Saint Blue Cloud's House, and her house on Browncliff Lane also served as private galleries (see #Exhibitions).

=== Modernism in Indiana ===
==== Indiana Museum for Modern Art ====
From July, 1938 to December, 1939 the bulk of La Tour's collection of approximately 500 art works by approximately 100 artists was warehoused in Indianapolis. La Tour moved with her daughter from New York to Indiana in the winter of 1939–40.

A small exhibit was displayed in a private home in Indianapolis in Spring, 1940. La Tour's Museum opened in summer, 1940 (see links below photographs and a painting of the Museum below). A larger, rotating exhibit was held at Indiana University, Bloomington, in Fall, 1940 (see Exhibitions). This enabled her to move her collection temporarily to Indiana University, because the fire hazard was high in the dry Fall at the new Museum.

La Tour lived in the barn so the farmhouse could be used as the Museum gallery. She envisioned classes in handicrafts, gardening, and sewing for the local children, but these plans may never have come to fruition.

==== Spellbound House ====
In 1947 and 1948, La Tour bought land closer to the town and artists' colony of Nashville, Indiana. There she designed and built a concrete-block home that she called Spellbound House (see links below to photographs and painting of this home).

==== Saint Blue Cloud's House ====
Sometime in the 1950s, La Tour designed and began building (mostly with her own labor) a wood frame house across the road from Spellbound House. This new home she called Saint Blue Cloud's House. Many photographs of this house taken in 1958–1963 are in the Indianapolis Museum of Art Archive, and see the link below under #Homes to a photograph of this house.

Fire: In 1962, La Tour was away for months, and the electricity was turned off. When she returned from New York City around Thanksgiving, an electrician turned the electricity on while La Tour was shopping in Nashville. Just as La Tour returned home about noon, moisture caused an electric box near the kitchen to burst into flame. She phoned for help. While the fire consumed some paintings, papers, books and a closet, volunteer firemen arrived and threw other paintings out on the lawn. Shortly, the city water supply failed. Luckily, La Tour had had a cistern built, which enabled the fire to be put out. Locals teased her about constructing a cistern when she had city water, but without the cistern, the fire would have burned down the house. It is not known how many works of art were lost in the fire.

==== Browncliff Lane ====
La Tour and her husband in the 1960s, Carl McCann, designed and built a "dream house" on North Browncliff Lane in Bloomington, Indiana. It was completed in 1968. Whereas her three previous homes had been built and operated on very limited funds, this final home was lavishly funded by McCann. Ca. 1970, La Tour and McCann also spent winters in Green Valley, Arizona.

=== Partners, family and daughter ===
==== Siblings ====
Onya had a number of siblings, including the two mentioned here.

Brother: Alva "Al" J. La Toor (1908–1958) was Onya La Tour's half brother, born to La Tour's father Simon Tarr and his second wife. He resided in California for 10 years, and in 1953, took up residence in Nashville, Indiana. He was a painter and leather craftsman. La Toor's studio was at 100 South Van Buren St., Nashville, Indiana, a distinctive building with 3 large windows in the front, still in use in 2018.

Sister: Merle Carrie Tarr, who died at a young age.

==== Daughter ====
Manya La Tour was born in 1926 in Hollywood, California and adopted by Onya that year. When Manya was 8 1/2 (1934), Onya left her at a Catholic boarding school for poor children, in Paris, France. Onya made little or no contact with Manya at this school, and Manya felt abandoned. After a year in the school, Manya's Great Aunt Eleanor Kellock settled the account at the school for $900 ($16,500 in 2018 dollars), and took Manya home. Manya graduated from Shortridge High School in Indianapolis, Indiana in 1943. Manya and her mother had a difficult relationship, and Manya left home at age 16.

==== Partners ====
Dates are approximate.

- 1910s: There is some evidence that La Tour may have had two marriages in Oklahoma, one to a man named Cicle.
- 1920s: Albro Latimer Kellock, a violinist from Scotland. They met at Graceland College in Lamona Iowa, and married December 3, 1920, in Jeffersonville, Indiana. They lived in at the homestead near Spokane and later in Seattle, Washington.
- Late 1920s/Early 1930s: La Tour met Arnold Franz Brasz when he was President of the California Watercolor Society. She shared a home and studio with Brasz, whom she may have married, first in Washington State and later in Hollywood, California.
- 1933: La Tour and her daughter lived with artist Philip Ayer Sawyer for a while. In 1934, La Tour lived in Sawyer's Paris studio while he remained in New York City. Later, in the early 1940s, La Tour provided Sawyer with a studio that was part of the Indiana Museum of Modern Art. Letters from Sawyer to La Tour indicate a difficult relationship. Whether it had a romantic component is not clear.
- 1935: La Tour moved to Puerto Rico with Antonio Colorado. Later she decided not to marry Colorado and moved to New York City.
- 1930s? La Tour may have had a romantic relationship with Oronzo Vito Gasparo.
- Late 1930s: Maurice Jungbeck, a writer, at 596 Riverside Drive, New York NY, which was also the Onya La Tour Gallery.
- 1940s: A 1943 portrait of La Tour is labeled Onya La Tour Dahl. Whether this indicates a romantic relationship, and the full name of Dahl, are unknown.
- 1950s: Emanuel Glicen Romano spent months at a time living with La Tour. It is uncertain to what extent this was a romantic relationship, but Romano inscribed a 1950 portrait "To dearest Onya, with love, E. Romano" (see #Art Portraits of Onya La Tour). Furthermore, a note in La Tour's diary calls 1951 "the peak of her existence" because Romano was with her.
- 1960s: La Tour married Indiana art enthusiast Carl McCann. In addition to building her a new house of her design, McCann took La Tour on a world tour, bought her an expensive car and other gifts.

=== Decline and death ===
In 1972, with failing health, La Tour donated her remaining art collection (over 100 works) and papers to the Indianapolis Museum of Art. Near the end of her life, La Tour developed Parkinson's disease, and had cataracts that rendered her blind. Carl McCann had a stroke and died in January, 1976. La Tour died in June the same year, and was buried at Greenlawn Cemetery, Nashville, Indiana.

Towards the end, her good friend Ellen Lee, a Senior Curator at the Indianapolis Museum of Art, sometimes drove La Tour to spend a few hours at St. Blue Cloud's house. La Tour deeded her property to the Roman Catholic Church, and willed funds for construction of a community center in Nashville, Indiana, which were used for a conference room in the Brown County Library.

== Photographs ==
In addition to the portrait above, the following photographs are available online. Where indicated, photos were taken by Frank Hohenberger.

=== Photographic Portraits ===
- ca. 1933 by photographer Virna Haffer.
- 1940: Portrait of LaTour sitting on the steps of her home, also the Indiana Museum of Modern Art. By Hohenberger.
- 1940: Portrait of LaTour with her daughter Manya. By Hohenberger.
- 1943: Onya La Tour Dahl, Rolla, Missouri. Photograph by H. A. Fletcher. The identity of Dahl is unknown: see #Partners.
- ca. 1943: Portrait by Roy Hirshburg: "Archives of American Art". Smithsonian Institution. also available at Hirshburg, Roy. "Onya La Tour, ca. 1943". aaa.si.edu. Smithsonian Archives of American Art.
- 1946: LaTour with the Home Economics Club of Van Buren Township, on the porch of her home, also the Indiana Museum of Modern Art. By Hohenberger. LaTour is at left in a dark dress. Another photo of the same group on the same day.
- Undated, ca. 1950: LaTour sitting in the living room of Spellbound House. Photographer unknown.
- Undated portrait attributed to Hohenberger: Clifford, Sara (September 26, 2017). "Cinefest celebrates 'three outrageous women'".
- Undated portrait in profile, photographer unknown: "(Onya La Tour in profile)". collection.imamuseum.org. Indianapolis Museum of Art.

=== Homes ===
- 1940, LaTour Gallery of Modern Art, also called the Indiana Museum of Modern Art. By Hohenberger. Note the paintings hanging on the exterior wall behind the porch. Additional images of this building and property will be found by searching the Hohenberger Collection for LaTour.
- 1948, Onya LaTour residence by Hohenberger. La Tour called this Spellbound House. It is at the top of Bryson Lane in Nashville, Indiana, on the East side of Bryson Lane. 1772 Bryson Lane. Photos of this house, extensively modified much later: "1772 Bryson Lane Nashville, IN 47448". estately.com.
- Undated (before 1958). Saint Blue Cloud's House, as LaTour called it, is the home that LaTour designed and built across Bryson Lane from Spellbound House (West side of Bryson Lane, 1774 Bryson Lane, Nashville IN). By Hohenberger. Many more photos of this house, when La Tour lived there, are in the Indianapolis Museum of Art Archives.

== Art Portraits ==
=== Art Portraits of Onya La Tour ===
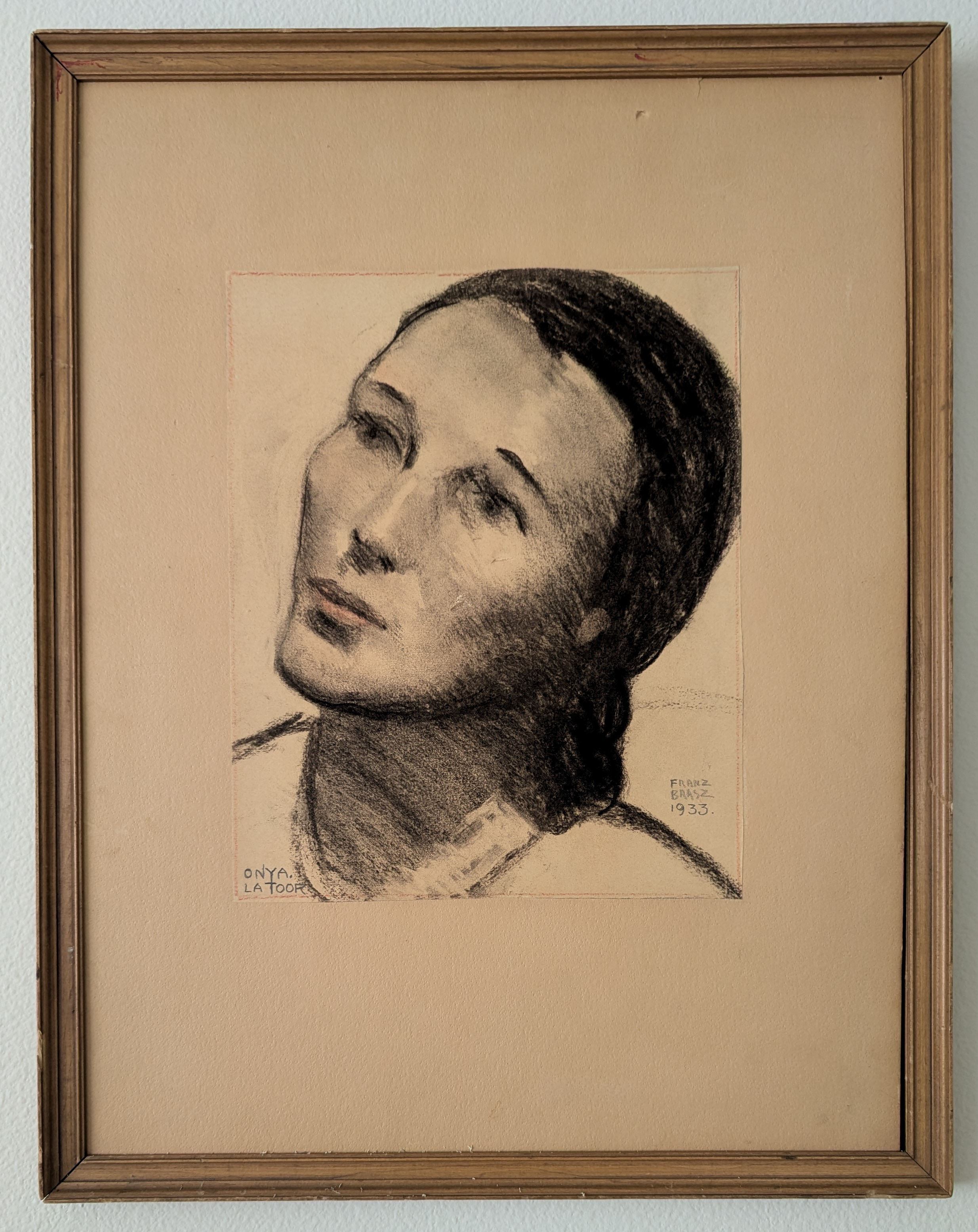
Portrait of Onya La Tour by Arnold Franz Brasz, 1933

La Tour has been called "the most painted woman of her time". The following list favors portraits with likeness to La Tour, omitting some with little resemblance.

- 1934: Philip Ayer Sawyer. "Red Blouse (Portrait of Onya LaTour)". collection.imamuseum.org. Indianapolis Museum of Art. Oil on canvas mounted on board.
- 1934–35: Lewitin, Landes. "Portrait of Onya". collection.imamuseum.org. Indianapolis Museum of Art. Oil paint on board.
- 1936: Earl Cavis Kerkam. "Onya La Tour". Indiana University Art Museum. Scroll down to the Special Lecture November 9, 2014, by Anastasia Karpova Tinari. Pastel and ink on mauve paper. Indiana University Art Museum accession 69.86.1.
- 1939: David Davidovich Burliuk. "Onya La Tour". museums.fivecolleges.org. Among many, this portrait represents one of the most realistic likenesses of La Tour (compare with photographic portraits). Pastel, pencil, ink, watercolor on paper.
- 1939: David Davidovich Burliuk. "Onya and Ola". collection.imamuseum.org. Indianapolis Museum of Art. Ola was the nickname of writer Maurice Jungbeck, La Tour's partner at the time. Oil paint on canvas.
- 1939: David Davidovich Burliuk. "Sketch of Onya La Tour". artvalue.com. Indianapolis Museum of Art. Watercolor and conte crayon on paper.
- 1942: Oronzo Vito Gasparo. "Portrait of Onya". collection.imamuseum.org. Indianapolis Museum of Art. Oil paint on canvas.
- 1950: Romano, Emanuel Glicen. "Spellbound House". collection.imamuseum.org. Indianapolis Museum of Art. Portrait of Onya La Tour seated, holding a cat in her lap. Inscribed "To dearest Onya, with love, E. Romano". Oil paint on canvas.

=== Art Portraits of La Tour's Homes ===
- 1939 Morris, Robert. "Indiana Museum for Modern Art, Brown County". collection.imamuseum.org. Indianapolis Museum of Art. Watercolor and ink on paper.
- 1953: La Toor, Al. "Spellbound House, Brown County, Indiana". collection.imamuseum.org. Indianapolis Museum of Art. Watercolor on paper.

== Exhibitions ==
This list of exhibitions of La Tour's collection is likely far from complete.

=== Exhibitions During La Tour's Lifetime ===
- 1940, March: A small exhibit of two works by Katherine Sophie Dreier titled Abstraction Number One and Bubbles, plus several woodcut prints by Helen West Heller, and works by Polly Ames, Boris Margo, Douglas Brown, Maurice Becker, Louis Bosa, and Lue Osborne. This exhibit was in the home of Ida Strawn Baker, 1635 N. Delaware St., Indianapolis, Indiana.
- 1940, October and November: Onya La Tour presents a rotating exhibition of modern art in the Steele Galleries, Indiana University, Bloomington. The catalog for this exhibit lists 444 works by 97 artists, about half of which are oil paintings, and half prints, watercolors, or drawings. The catalog is online, and includes 100 works by David Davidovich Burliuk, 9 works by Oronzo Vito Gasparo, 76 works by Helen West Heller (30-some of which are now in the Indianapolis Museum of Art), and 28 works by Phillip Ayer Sawyer. Also included are one or a few works by each of Josef Albers, Maurice Becker, de:Hans Böhler, Ilya Bolotowsky, Arnold Franz Brasz, Stuart Davis, Arthur Dove, Arshile Gorky, John D. Graham, Guy Maccoy, Jackson Pollock, Emanuel Glicen Romano, Will Henry Stevens, and many others. One of the two paintings listed by Stuart Davis sold for $362,500 in December 2010. This exhibition may never have taken place. A letter dated October 11, 1940, says she will be unable to participate, despite the catalog having been printed, as "pressing business requires [her] presence in the East".
- 1942: Twenty Portraits of Onya La Tour, Indiana University Art Center.
- 1969: The Personal Collection of Onya La Tour, October 5–23, Leah Ransburg Gallery, Indiana Central College. The catalog to this exhibit reproduces a "forward for the catalog of her amazing collection" dated February 5, 1942, by Katherine Sophie Dreier, President, Société Anonyme: Museum of Modern Art. The catalog to this exhibit lists 41 works by 31 artists.

=== Posthumous exhibitions ===
- 2014–15: The Onya La Tour Collection: Modernism in Indiana, Indianapolis Museum of Art, October 17, 2014 – April 12, 2015. "Presenting 30 works from the unconventional collection of an Indiana native, The Onya La Tour Collection: Modernism in Indiana highlights the early Modernist movement in America."
- 2014–15: Onya La Tour: Pioneering Modern Art in Indiana at the Indiana University Art Museum.
