= San Pedro Art Association =

- Formation: 1936
- Founded at: San Pedro, Los Angeles

The San Pedro Art Association, established in 1936, is an art association set within the Los Angeles Harbor community of California. It has a history of established and well known artists dating back to its inception. Through exhibitions and public lectures, it encouraged works beyond representational art, and included figurative and abstract expressionist paintings in the 1950s. Though it originally exhibited primarily watercolor and oil paintings, the association evolved to include various other mediums and art forms.

== History ==
The San Pedro Art Association (SPAA) was established in 1936 in San Pedro, California. The original members' goals focused on expanding art in San Pedro and its surrounding communities. The association was formed by local artists in the community and it held seasonal art shows and exhibitions that were juried by established professionals and awarded artists in both oil painting and watercolor mediums. The SPAA has historically sponsored cultural art exchanges with artists outside the United States; this tradition continues through current exhibitions. Since then, the association has expanded and is known for bringing local artists together with varied art forms that include painting, photography, sculpture, ceramics, woodworking and jewelry making. Exhibitions continue to be presented seasonally and are open to the public.

In 1953, under the direction of its President Jay Meuser, the San Pedro Art Association wrote many of its bylaws and became a non-profit corporation providing a structure for the future growth of its membership and activities. Some of the significant stated goals that continue to be utilized and implemented are:

- To further the mutual inspiration and development of its members by seeking to stimulate their interest in this organization and to encourage them in their own particular line of work.
- To promote means and opportunities for the education of the public with respect to art activities within the community.
- To enlarge and intensify the interest of its members in the artistic, cultural, and educational affairs of the community for its betterment by contributing to and encouraging art activities within the community.

These established goals of enriching the community through art were significant and continue today as an important function of the foundation for the organization and its membership. The San Pedro Art Association is responsible for art lectures and demonstrations by local and other prominent artists as well as providing community events and monthly artwalks of galleries in historical downtown San Pedro.

In 2011, the San Pedro Art Association had its 75th anniversary celebration and exhibition. Under the leadership of the association's president John Stinson, San Pedro Art Association was presented with certificates of recognition by the Los Angeles City and County as well as the State of California.

=== Honors and recognition ===
- California Legislature, State Assembly Certificate of Recognition, September 24, 2011
- City of Los Angeles Resolution, September 16, 2011
- County of Los Angeles Commendation, September 13, 2011
