= Orontius =

Orontius is a name of Latin origin. It can refer to:

People

- Marcellus Orontius, a disciple of Plotinus
- Orontius of Lecce, or Oronzo, saint
- Vincent, Orontius, and Victor (d. 305 AD), saints
- Orontius Finnaeus (Oronce Finé) (1494-1555), French cartographer and mathematician

Places

- Orontius (crater), on the Moon, named after Orontius Finnaeus

== See also ==
- Orontes River
- Oronzo (disambiguation)
