= Emanuel Glicen Romano =

Italian-American painter

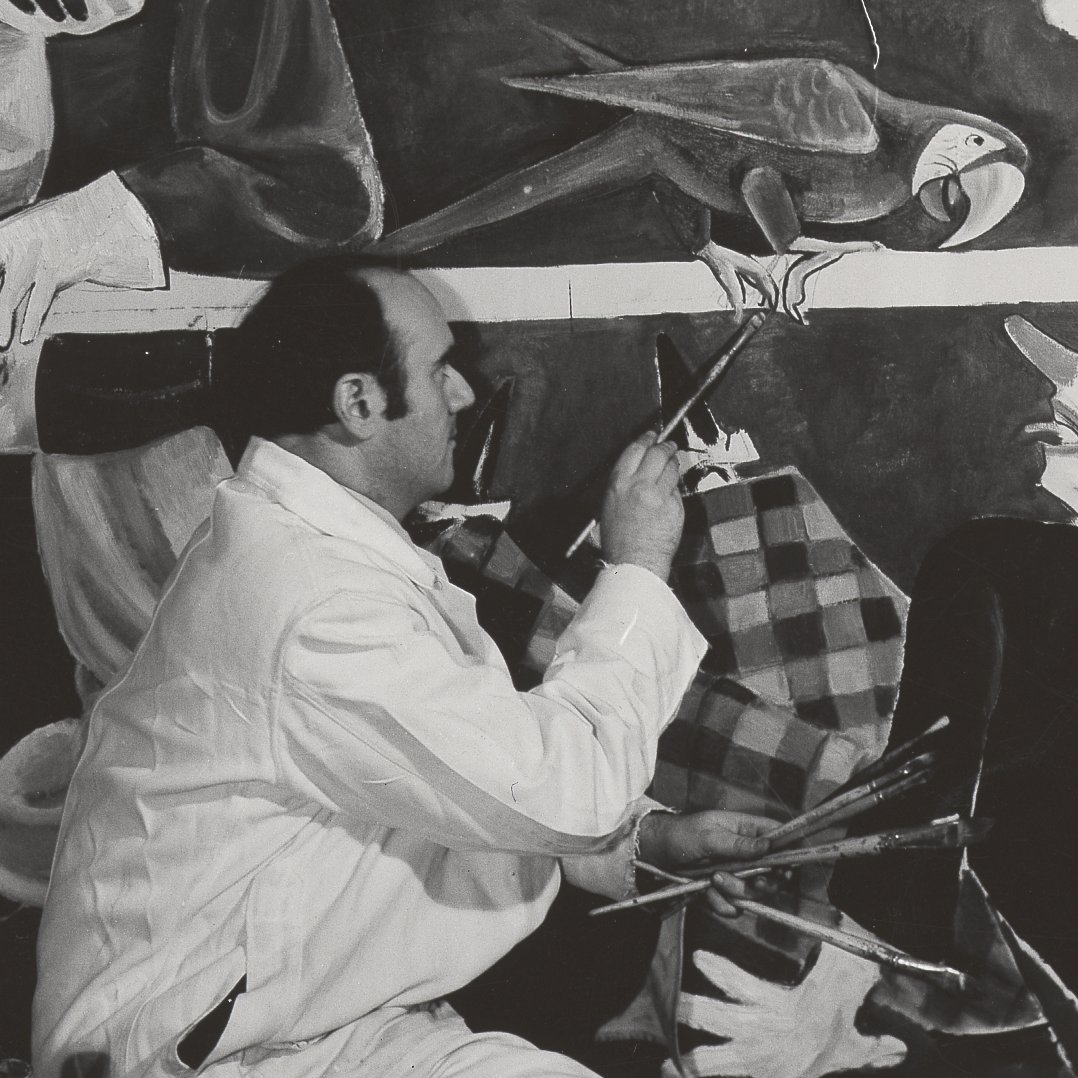
- 1936 mural
- Born: 1897; Rome
- Died: 1984 (aged 86–87)
- Other name: Emanuel Glicenstein
- Occupation: Painter
- Parent: Enrico Glicenstein

Emanuel Glicen Romano or Emanuel Glicenstein (1897–1984) was a painter born in Italy. He emigrated to America and spent some time in Safed in Israel. where he organised a museum for his father's work.

== Life ==
Emanuel Glicenstein was born in Rome on 23 September 1897. His father Henryk Glicenstein was a sculptor and he was living in Rome with his wife Helena (born Hirszenberg) when Emanuel was born. His father obtained Italian citizenship and adopted the name Enrico. Emanuel was brought up in Italy, Switzerland, Germany, England and Poland. in 1926 Emanuel and his father sailed for New York. They briefly visited Chicago. Glicenstein's sister, Beatrice, and mother joined them in New York years later. Romano changed his name when he was in America and some have erroneously thought this was to avoid Jewish discrimination. However Romano changed his name in order that he could create his own success and to avoid being accused of exploiting his father's fame. In 1936 Romano was working for the Federal Art Project creating murals (see picture). During and immediately after World War II, Romano created a series of allegorical works depicting graphic holocaust images that were held closely by the family after his death. One of these works is in the Florida Holocaust Museum in St. Petersburg Florida.

Romano was a good friend of Onya La Tour, an art collector and advocate for modern art. A 1940 catalog of La Tour's collection lists two works by Romano. Their relationship may have been a romantic one. In 1950, Romano painted a portrait of La Tour.

Emanuel's father died in 1942 in a car accident before they could travel to Israel. In 1944 Romano exploited the studies he had completed at the Pennsylvania Academy of Fine Arts and the Art Institute of Chicago when he taught at the City College of New York. He moved to Safed in Israel in 1953 to set up a museum in his father's memory. In November 1984 Romano died and the following year the Glicenstein Museum became the Israel Bible Museum and many valuable paintings were stored away.

In 2008 the Deputy Mayor of Safed was charged with stealing paintings including one by Mane-Katz, which was recognised by a curator in Haifa. The paintings that had been put in storage included ones by Eugène Delacroix, Édouard Manet and Paul Cézanne.

== Legacy ==
Romano has paintings in the Indianapolis Museum of Art, Metropolitan Museum of Art, the Boston Fine Arts Museum, the Fogg Museum and the Musée Nacional de France. Recently his work has been added to the Florida Holocaust Museum collection. His notable works include his holocaust allegorical paintings as well as portraits of Marianne Moore, his father and William Carlos Williams. Romano created a portrait of T.S. Eliot as well as woodcuts to illustrate an edition of Eliot's The Waste Land.
