= Helen West Heller =

American painter

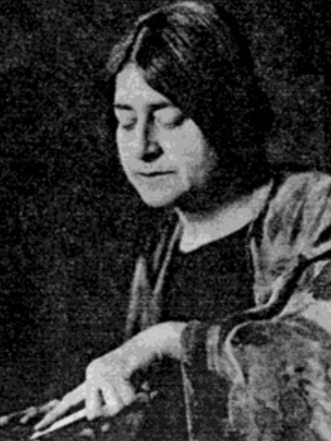
- Helen West Heller, 1930
- Born: Helen Barnhart; 1872; Rushville, Illinois
- Died: November 19, 1955 (aged 82–83); New York, New York
- Known for: Painting, Printmaking, Poetry

Helen West Heller (1872 – November 19, 1955) (Note: Various sources provide a date of birth in either 1870 or 1885, but most agree on a date of 1872.) was an American painter, printmaker, poet, and illustrator.

Heller was born Helen Barnhart in Rushville, Illinois, the daughter of a farmer, boat builder, and decoy maker. Plagued by poor health throughout her life, she suffered as a result in school. In 1892 she moved to Chicago, becoming a model to support her self-training in art. In 1902 she moved to New York City, doing factory work and embroidery to support herself. While taking lessons at the Art Students League of New York; she also had lessons, at some point in life, at the St. Louis School of Fine Arts in Missouri. She also studied with Robert Henri and George Bellows at the Ferrer Center Modern School. In 1921 she returned to Chicago, bringing with her fifty paintings that excited no interest in the local artistic community; consequently, she became a founding member of the Chicago No-Jury Society. She cut her first woodcut two years later. Heller's poetry, meanwhile, attracted the attention of Jane Heap, and between 1926 and 1928 she published a large number of works in journals and in the weekly Art Magazine of the Chicago Evening Post under the name "Tanka". She attempted to create a woodcut magazine, and her success in poetry led her to illustrate a book of poems, Migratory Urge, with her own woodcuts.

Heller returned to New York City in 1932. During this phase of her career she produced paintings, prints, and murals for the Works Progress Administration. Heller became a good friend of Onya La Tour, an art collector and modern art enthusiast, who directed the Federal Art Gallery of the Federal Arts Project of the Work Projects Administration, 225 W 57th St, New York NY. A 1940 catalog of La Tour's collection lists 76 works by Heller.

During the 1930s, Heller became active in Marxist causes; she attended the First American Artists' Congress Against War and Fascism in 1936, and in December of that year was beaten unconscious by police and arrested with more than 200 others while leading an Artists Union protest against layoffs in the WPA. Heller died in New York in 1955, nearly forgotten; her body was unclaimed for ten days while relatives were sought.

Heller married twice, but lived independently for much of her life. In 1948 she was named an associate of the National Academy of Design, and in 1944 and 1949 she received awards for her prints from the Library of Congress. A large collection of Heller's work is owned by the Metropolitan Museum of Art. Eight works are in the graphic arts collection at the National Museum of American History, donated by the artist herself after a 1949 show of 35 of her prints. Other examples of her art may be found at the National Gallery of Art, the Smithsonian American Art Museum, the Indianapolis Museum of Art, and the Fine Arts Museums of San Francisco. A self-portrait of 1948, The Seasons, is held by the National Academy of Design.
