= Enrico Glicenstein =

Polish sculptor

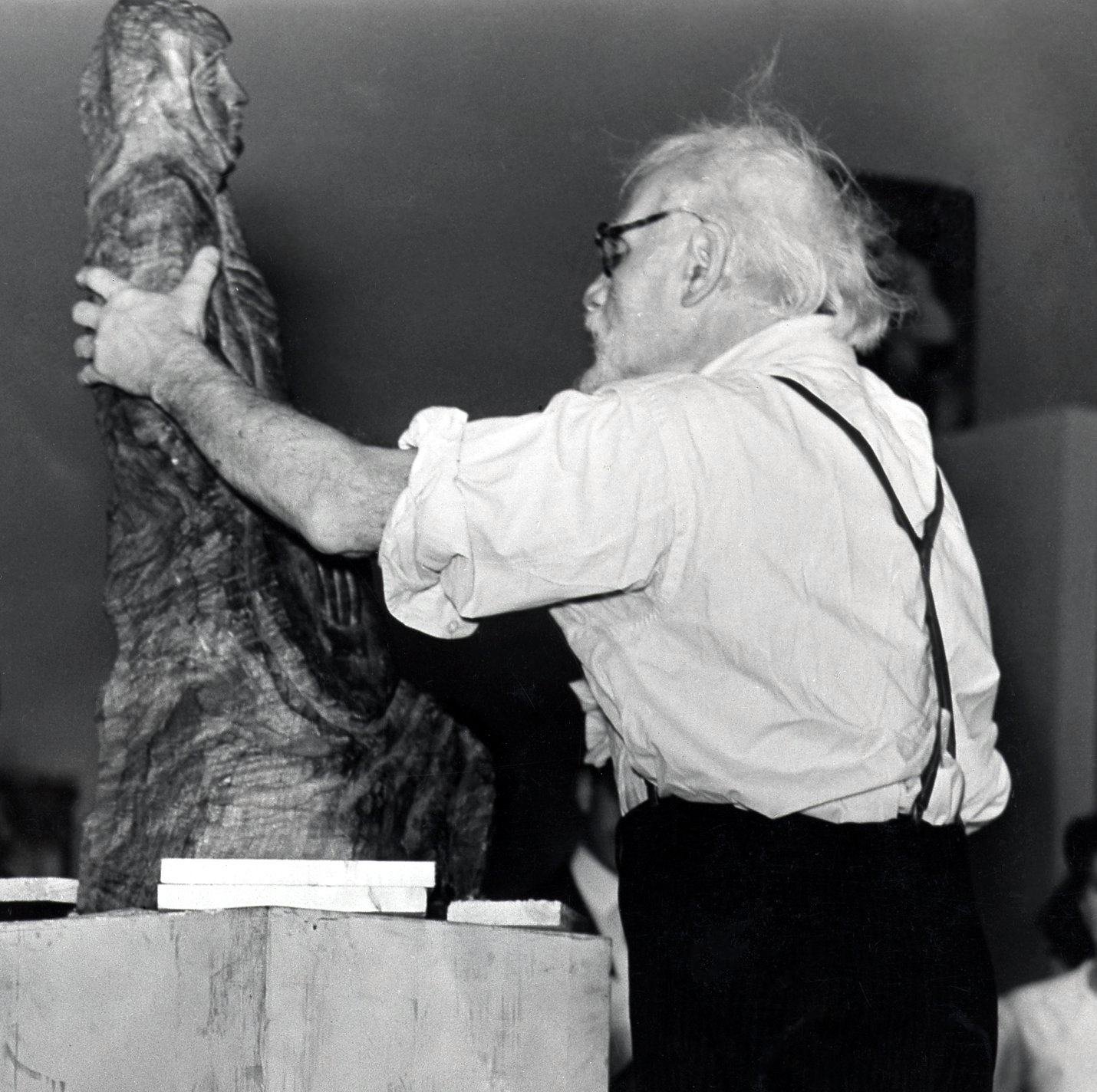
- Glicenstein
- Born: Enoch Hendryk Glicenstein; 24 May 1870; Turek, Poland
- Died: 30 December 1942 (aged 72); New York City, United States
- Known for: Sculpture
- Children: Emanuel Glicen Romano

Enrico Glicenstein (24 May 1870 – 30 December 1942) was a Polish-born sculptor who lived in Italy and the United States.

== Life ==
Glicenstein was born in Turek, Poland in 1870 and named Enoch Hendryk Glicenstein. His father was a teacher who also worked as a monumental mason. He initially showed interest in being a rabbi whilst working in Łódź painting signs and carving wood. After studying in Munich at the Royal Bavarian Academy of Art he married Helena Hirszenberg in 1896. The couple lived in Rome where he adopted the name "Enrico". His son Emanuel was born in Rome, and Glicenstein became an Italian citizen.

== Leaving Italy ==
In 1906, Glicenstein returned from a trip to Germany and exhibited his paintings there until World War I broke out and he moved his family to Poland. He took over the Chair belonging to Xawery Dunikowski at the University of Warsaw in 1910. At the end of the war the family lived in Switzerland until they emigrated to London in 1920. During the next eight years he exhibited first in London and later in Rome and Venice.

== America ==
Glicenstein emigrated to America in 1928 with his son Emanuel. His wife and daughter joined him in New York in 1935. Glicenstein wanted to go to Palestine but he died in a car accident in 1942. His son became a notable painter and lived in Safed in Israel.

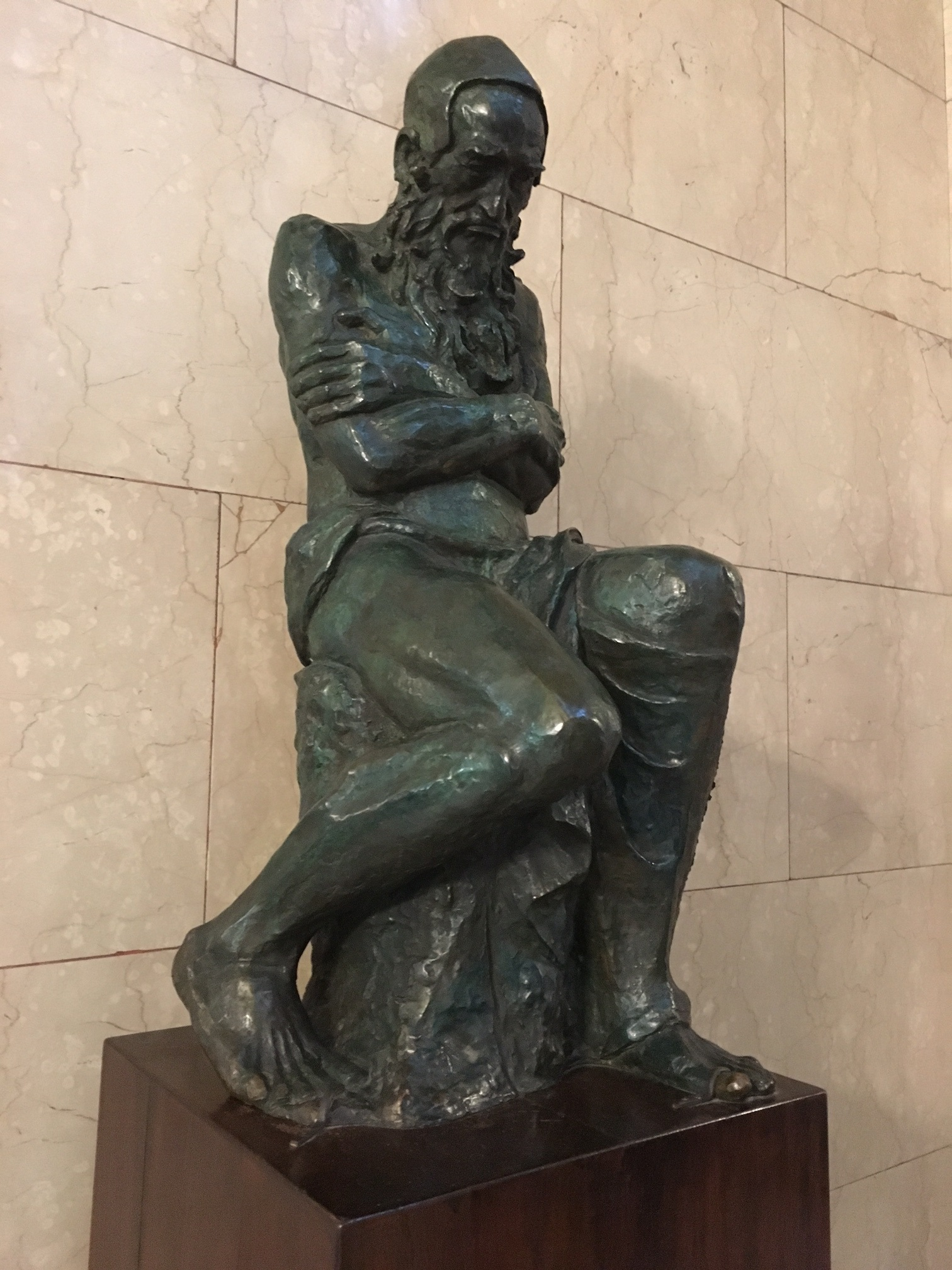
Statue of Jeremiah by Enrico Glicenstein on display in Special Collections at Cleveland Public Library.

== Legacy ==
The Glicenstein Museum was founded in Safed, Israel. It became the Israel Bible Museum in 1985, and many Glicenstein sculptures are still displayed there. In 2008 the Deputy Mayor of Safed was indicted for stealing paintings that had been put in storage when the Glicenstein Museum changed its role.

Glicenstein's works are found in a number of collections including the Musée d'Art Moderne de la Ville de Paris and the Pompidou Centre, the Israel Museum, the Galleria Nazionale d'Arte Moderna in Rome, the national museums in Kraków and Warsaw, the Brooklyn Museum, the Metropolitan Museum of Art and the United States Holocaust Memorial Museum. Glicenstein has papers in the Smithsonian.

Jean Cassou has published a book on Glicenstein Sculpture. Portraits of Glicenstein and his daughter Beatrice were made by his son Emanuel Glicen Romano. (His son changed his name to avoid being accused of exploiting his father's fame).

In collaboration with Glicenstein's estate, the late curator and art historian Charlotte Snyder Sholod wrote a definitive book, Life & Work of Enrico Glicenstein. Published in 2014 by Hard Press Editions, and with two chapters and the epilogue written by Polish art historian Tamara Szytma following Sholod's death, the volume features a thorough biography and appraisal of Glicenstein's work and a comprehensive catalogue of his sculptures.
