= Jay Meuser =

American painter (1911–1963)

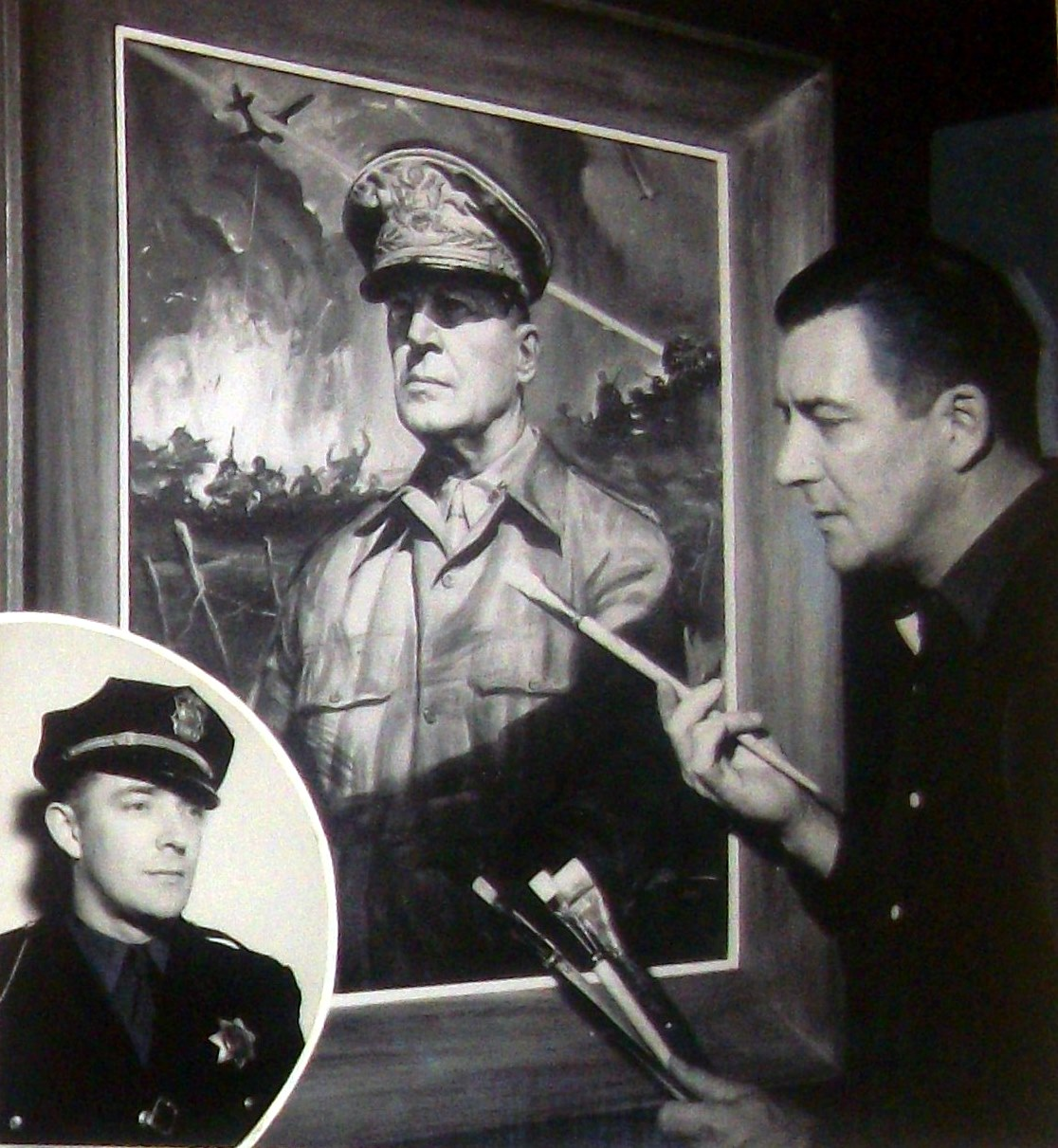
- Meuser painting General of the Army Douglas MacArthur's portrait in 1950
- Born: September 28, 1911; San Francisco, California
- Died: August 19, 1963 (aged 51); San Pedro, California
- Known for: Painting
- Movement: Abstract Expressionism
- Awards: First Award in Oil Painting: 1951 (21st) & 1953 (23rd) Annual Fall Exhibition, 1952 (22nd) & 1953 (23rd) Annual Spring Exhibition and 1953 Gallery Opening Exhibition, San Pedro Art Association First Award in Water Color: 1953-23rd Annual Fall Exhibition, San Pedro Art Association; Jury Commendation (1953) and First Award and Gold Medal of Honor for Water Color (1955): 2nd & 4th Annual Greater Long Beach Art Exhibition; Jury Award Certificate and Blue Ribbon in Oil Painting: 1954-9th Annual National Madonna Festival, Los Angeles H. Daniels Award: 42nd Annual National Exhibition California Water Color Society, 1962
- Elected: President - San Pedro Art Association, 1953; Member - California Water Color Society, 1955

Jay Meuser (September 28, 1911 — August 19, 1963) was an American abstract expressionist painter. Meuser's style was versatile and his works prolific. In his lifetime he worked as an illustrator, portrait painter and cartoonist for several newspaper editorial pages.

== Biography ==
He married Dorothy Ellen Morris in 1938. Their only child, Jacqueline Ellen Meuser, married Suren Saroyan, MD, cousin of the famous American Playwright William Saroyan.

"I've led a most full life," he said to his wife just before his death. Besides teaching at the Art School of San Francisco, he had been a baseball pitcher, a vaudeville performer, a sailor working around the world twice, and "was more than a fair boxer." He had worn 14 different law enforcement badges. At 31, he was the youngest chief of police in Marin County, California. As a member of the Sheet Metal Workers International, he worked at the Terminal Island Naval Shipyard. There he was awarded the Navy's "Certificate of Award" for a suggestion that was adopted concerning the building of naval ships. He also wrote a column in the union's newspaper.

== Career ==
Meuser painted many of the 20th century prominent personalities, including Presidents Franklin D. Roosevelt, Dwight D. Eisenhower, Harry S. Truman, Richard M. Nixon and John F. Kennedy. His portrait of Roosevelt hung in the White House and he received a personal letter of thanks from the late president. While at the shipyard, he was commissioned to paint the portraits of Rear Admiral and Mrs. Paul Hendren, USN and Rear Admiral T. P. Wynkoop USN. He drew two sketches of General Douglas MacArthur in 1950; each accompanying editorials in the Long Beach Press Telegram. The latter sketch prompted an oil painting commissioned by a prominent businessman in the San Francisco Bay Area. Shortly after his death, the original sketch of General MacArthur was donated to Fort MacArthur, San Pedro CA by his wife in 1964. In addition to his oil, water and casein paint colors, he also did many editorial cartoon sketches for newspapers.

=== Later work ===
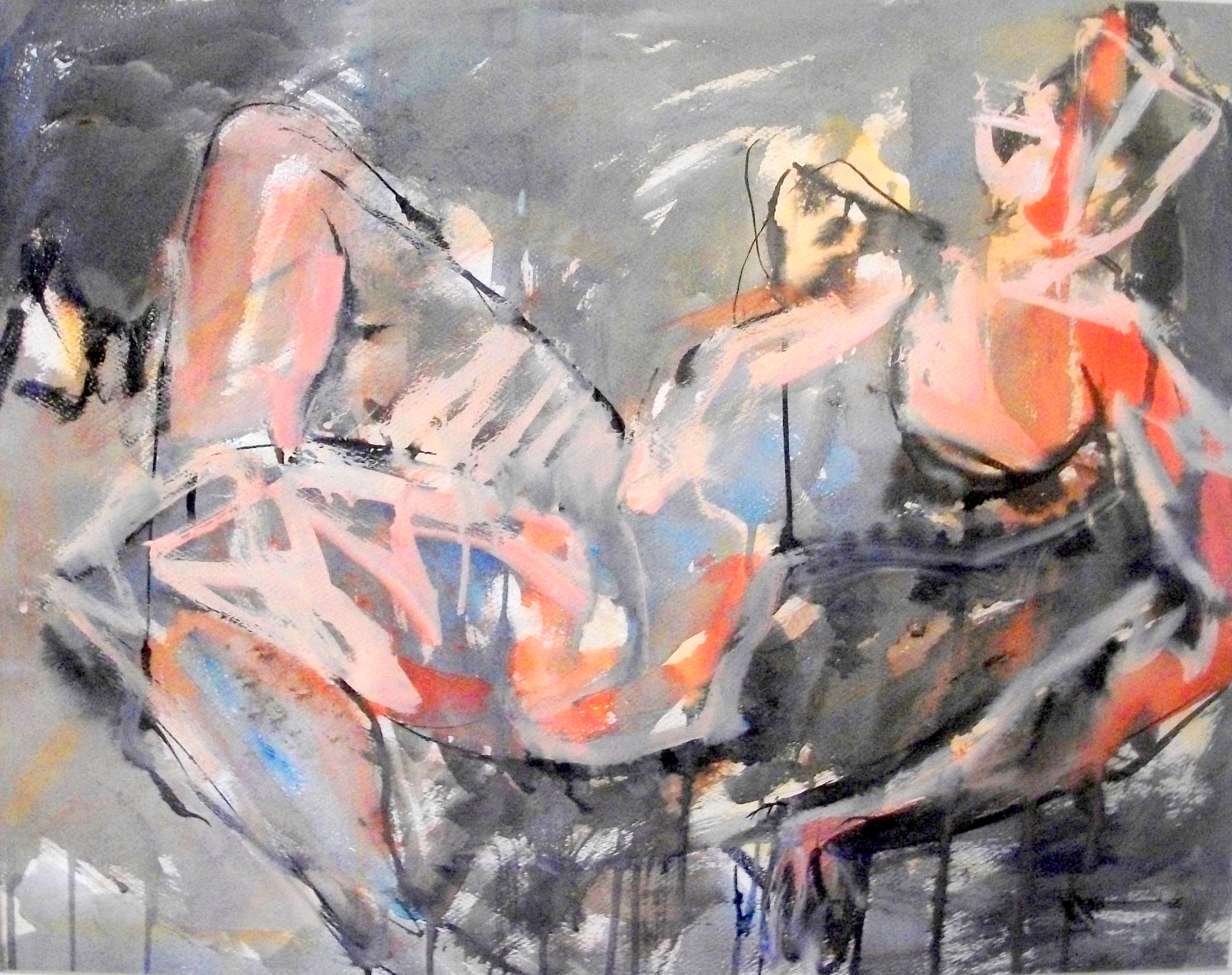
Abstract nude painting, 1956

By 1949, Meuser had devoted his life to painting full-time. Around 1950 he became interested in abstraction. Previously, his subjects were depicted in realistic terms. He wrote about his painting Mare Nostrum, "It is far better to capture the glorious spirit of the sea than to paint all of its tiny ripples." The vast majority of his artwork was painted between 1949 and 1957. The variety and quality of his work, as well as the quantity, during this period was significant.

As President of the San Pedro Art Association in 1953, he oversaw three galleries and designed, renovated and constructed plans for the group's first permanent gallery. In 1955 he was elected a member of the nationwide California Water Color Society (currently known as the National Watercolor Society), where he was close friends with past presidents Arnold Franz Brasz and Leonard Edmondson. He participated and won awards in scores of art exhibitions across the country. His award winning painting Occultation went on tour in the traveling section of the California Water Color Society's Annual Exhibition of 1962. His abstract work Northward was requested by the Long Beach Museum of Art in 1957 and remains in the museum's permanent collection as Abstract Expressionism.

==== Honors and recognition ====
- California Legislature, State Assembly Certificate of Recognition, July 7, 2011.
- City of Los Angeles Certificate of Tribute, July 7, 2011.
- County of Los Angeles Commendation, July 7, 2011.
- Plaque Dedication by the San Pedro Art Association honoring Jay Meuser, mounted on an historical building in the heart of the San Pedro Art Walk, July 7, 2011.
- Jay Meuser Memorial Award, presented by the National Watercolor Society for Abstract Art.

==== Purchase prizes ====
- San Pedro Art Patrons Purchase Award, 1953.
- Top Recommendation for Purchase by Jury of Awards — Long Beach Museum of Art, 1957.

==== Exhibitions ====
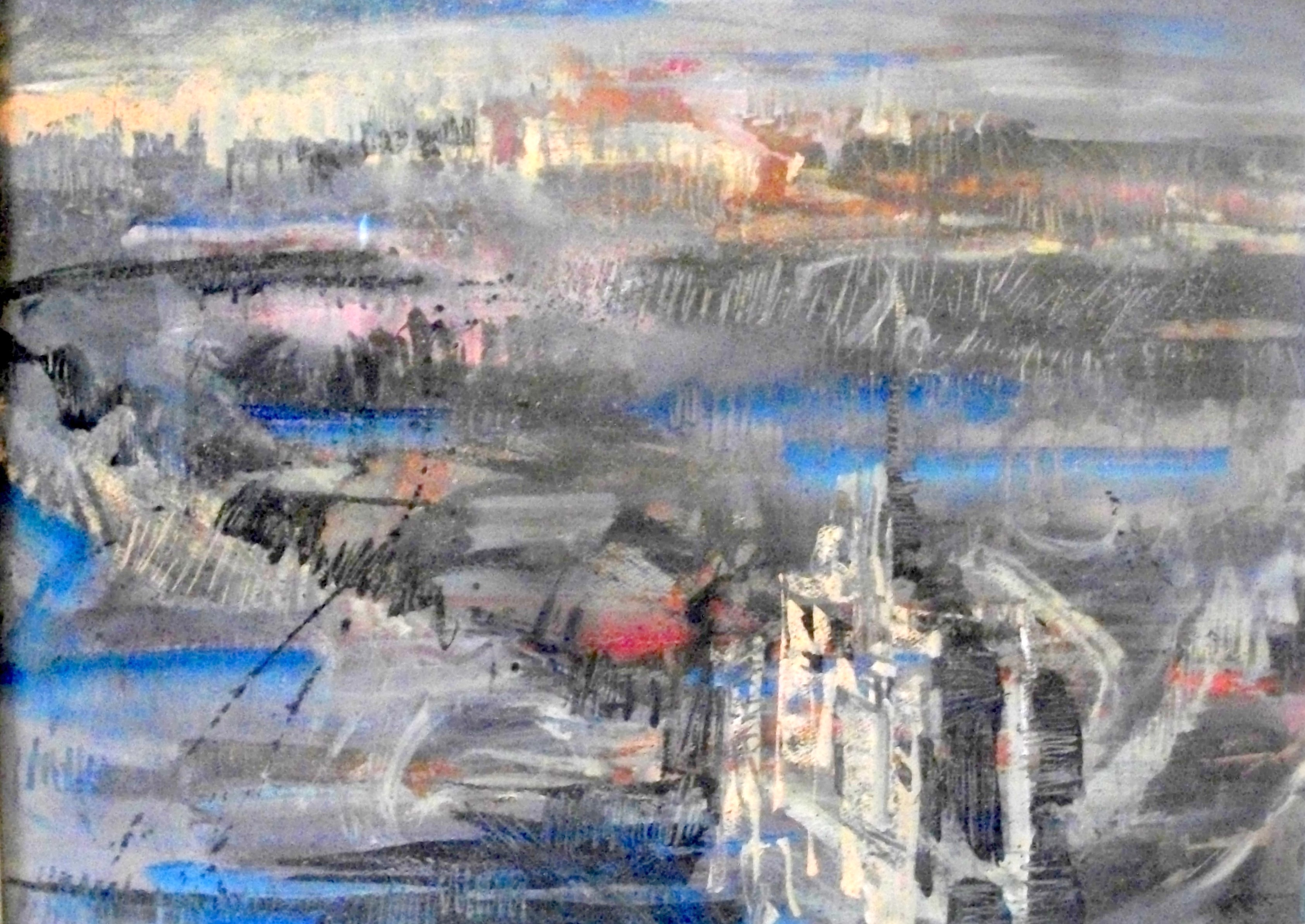
Abstract scene, c. 1955

- Los Angeles County Museum, Los Angeles, California
- California Palace of the Legion of Honor, San Francisco, California
- Oakland Art Museum, Oakland, California
- Virginia Museum of Fine Art, Richmond, Virginia
- California State Fair, Sacramento, California
- National Orange Show, San Bernardino, California
- Pasadena Museum of Art, Pasadena, California
- Denver Art Museum, Denver, Colorado
- National Institute of Modern Art, Mexico City, Mexico
- The Institute of Contemporary Art, Boston, Massachusetts
- University of Southern California, Los Angeles, California
- Santa Barbara Museum of Art, Santa Barbara, California
- DeCordova Museum of Art, Lincoln Massachusetts
- Santa Monica Art Gallery, Santa Monica, California
- Long Beach Museum of Art, Long Beach, California
- Palos Verdes Library/Gallery, Palos Verdes Estates, California
- Richmond Art Center, Richmond, California
- Benjamin Franklin Library, Mexico City, Mexico
- North American Cultural Institute, Mexico City, Mexico
- Newport Harbor Annual, Newport Beach, California
- San Francisco Museum of Art, San Francisco, California

==== Collections ====
- Marymount College, Palos Verdes, California
- Long Beach Museum of Art, Long Beach, California
- Richard Dana Junior High School, San Pedro, California
- Fort MacArthur, San Pedro, California
- John F. Kennedy Presidential Library and Museum, Boston, Massachusetts
- Richard Nixon Presidential Library and Museum, Yorba Linda, California

==== Affiliations ====
- Past President of the San Pedro Art Association (1953)
- California Water Color Society
- San Francisco Art Institute
- Los Angeles Art Association
- Artists Equity Association
