= Arnold Franz Brasz =

American painter (1888–1966)

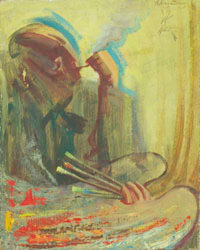
A. Franz Brasz by contemporary Jay Meuser

Arnold Franz Brasz (July 19, 1888 – April 1, 1966) was an American painter, sculptor, and printmaker who was born in Polk County, Wisconsin on July 19, 1888. He studied at the Minneapolis School of Fine Arts and also with Robert Henri in New York. By the early 1920s, he was dividing his time between southern California and Wisconsin. He is considered a member of the Ashcan School, and his public commissions include Fruit Pickers, a 1940 mural in the city hall of Redlands, California showing four Native American farm workers. Brasz died at his home in Glendale, California on April 1, 1966.

== Auction record ==
At the Big Top, oil on canvas

The auction record for a painting by Arnold Franz Brasz is $31,070. This record was set by At the Big Top, a 23 by 29.7 inch oil painting on canvas sold May 4, 2006 at Shannon's Fine Art Auctioneers (Milford, Connecticut).
