= Oronzo Vito Gasparo =

American artist (1903–1969)

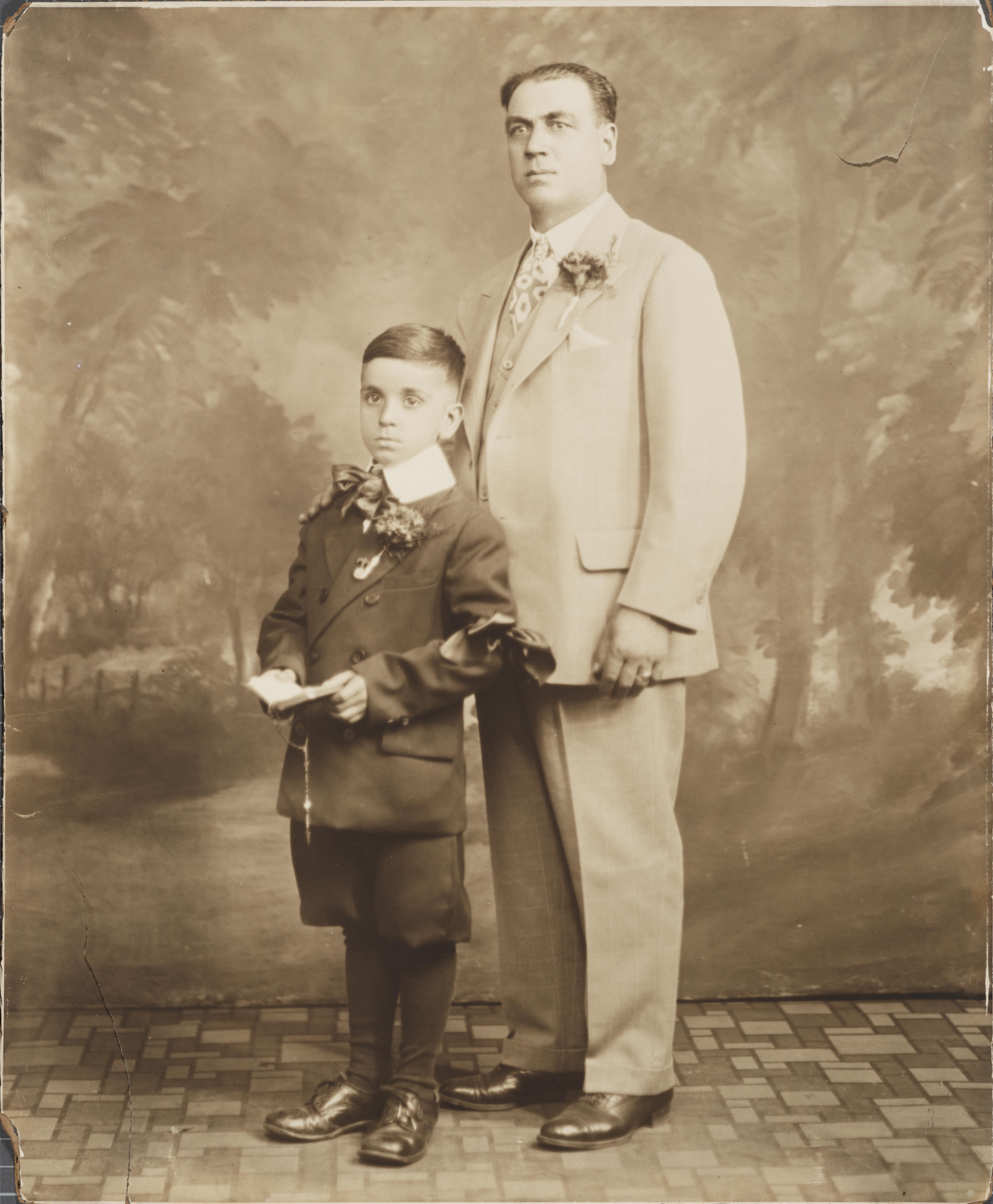
- Oronzo Vito Gasparo and son, c. 1920.
- Born: 1903; Rutigliano, Bari, Italy
- Died: 1969 (aged 66); New York City, New York, United States
- Citizenship: United States
- Education: National Academy of Design
- Occupation: Artist

Oronzo Vito Gasparo (1903–1969), was an American artist often known for surreal townscape painting, design, and crafts.

== Background ==
Oronzo Vito Gasparo was born in Rutigliano, Bari, Italy in 1903, one of seventeen children. His parents were Italian and Hindu. He spent many active years in California, and died in New York City in 1969.

Gasparo studied at the National Academy of Design in New York; he was mentored by Preston Dickinson and was Dickinson's favorite pupil.

== Early years ==
Oronzo Vito Gasparo worked under the Works Progress Administration Easel Project during the Great Depression.

A number of Gasparo's works were acquired by Onya La Tour, who was an avid collector and enthusiast of modern art in New York in the 1930s, and who directed the Federal Art Gallery of the Federal Arts Project of the Work Projects Administration, 225 W 57th St, New York NY.

== Work ==
During his lifetime he had over 40 one-man shows ranging from 1928 to a retrospective in 1974. Many examples of his paintings can be seen at WikiArt.Org.

=== Methods ===
1. Designer
2. Painting

=== Mediums ===
1. Gouache
2. Mixed-Media/Multi-Media
3. Oil
4. Watercolor

=== Styles ===
1. Surrealism

=== Subjects ===
1. Architecture/Buildings
2. Figure
3. Genre (Human Activity)
4. Spanish Missions
5. Townscape

=== Exhibitions ===
1. Art Institute of Chicago
2. Carnegie Institute
3. Corcoran Gallery
4. Museum of Modern Art, New York
5. Pennsylvania Academy
6. Salons of America
7. Society of Independent Artists
8. Whitney Museum of American Art

== Trivia ==
- Gasparo was an avid dancer and claimed to have brought the rumba to New York.
