= Saint Orontius =

Saint Orontius may refer to:

- Orontius of Lecce (Oronzo)
- See Vincent, Orontius, and Victor for St Orontius, martyr
