= List of United States post office murals =

Public artworks created 1934–1943

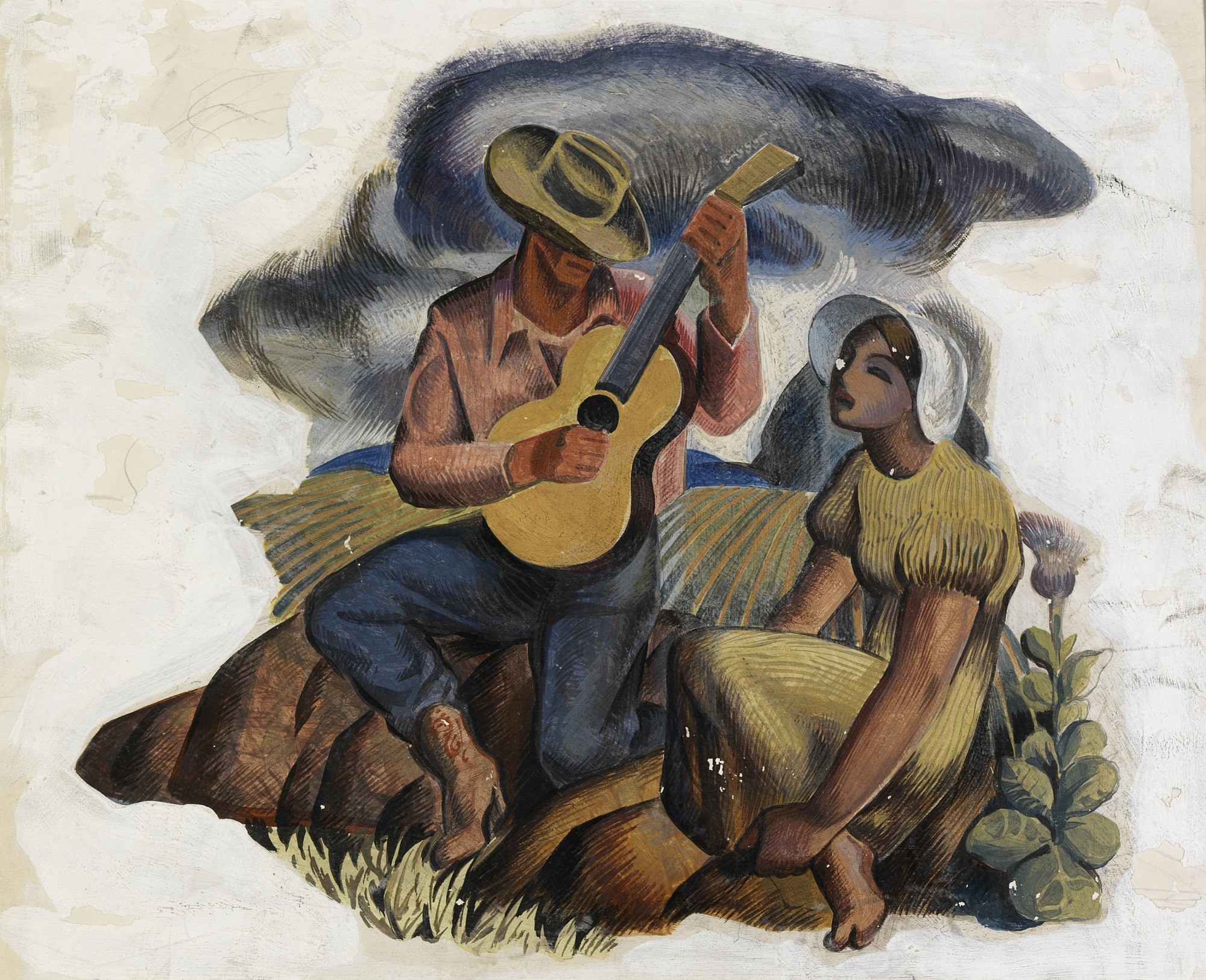
Music of the Plains (mural study, Kilgore, Texas, Post Office, 1939) by Xavier Gonzalez. This New Deal artwork features a cowboy of Mexican heritage serenading a woman, symbolizing the deep Hispanic cultural roots in Kilgore's identity. The original study is housed in the Smithsonian American Art Museum.

From 1934 to 1943, the Procurement Division of the United States Department of the Treasury commissioned murals in post office buildings across the country. Part of the New Deal, the stated objective of commissioning United States post office murals was to secure artwork that met high artistic standards for public buildings, where it would be accessible to all people. The murals were intended to boost the morale of the American people suffering from the effects of the Depression by depicting uplifting subjects the people knew and loved.

Murals produced through the Treasury Department's Section of Painting and Sculpture (1934–1943) were funded as a part of the cost of the construction of new post offices, with one percent of the cost set aside for artistic enhancements. Murals were commissioned through competitions open to all artists in the United States. Almost 850 artists were commissioned to paint 1,371 murals, most of which were installed in post offices; 162 of the artists were women and three were African American.

The Treasury Relief Art Project (1935–1938), which provided artistic decoration for existing Federal buildings, produced a smaller number of post office murals. TRAP was established with funds from the Works Progress Administration. The Section supervised the creative output of TRAP, and selected a master artist for each project. Assistants were then chosen by the artist from the rolls of the WPA Federal Art Project.

Artists were asked to paint in an "American scene" style, depicting ordinary citizens in a realistic manner. Abstract and modern art styles were discouraged. Artists were also encouraged to produce works that would be appropriate to the communities where they were to be located and to avoid controversial subjects. Projects were closely scrutinized by the Section for style and content, and artists were paid only after each stage in the creative process was approved.

The Section and the Treasury Relief Art Project were overseen by Edward Bruce, who had directed the Public Works of Art Project (1933–1934). They were commission-driven public work programs that employed artists to beautify American government buildings, strictly on the basis of quality. This contrasts with the work-relief mission of the Federal Art Project (1935–1943) of the Works Progress Administration, the largest of the New Deal art projects. So great was its scope and cultural impact that the term "WPA" is often mistakenly used to describe all New Deal art, including the U.S. post office murals. "New Deal artwork" is a more accurate term to describe the works of art created under the federal art programs of that period.

The murals are the subject of efforts by the United States Postal Service to preserve and protect them. This is particularly important and problematical as some of them have disappeared or deteriorated. Some are ensconced in buildings that are worth far less than the artwork.

== Alaska ==
Following is a list of United States post office murals created in Alaska.

Location	Mural title	Image	Artist	Date	Notes	NRHP listed
Anchorage; Post Office and Court House	Alaskan Landscape		Arthur T. Kerrick	1946	Courtroom wall behind the judge's bench Commissioned in 1941, installed in the 1950s	1978 78000516
Wrangell	Old Town in Alaska		Austin Mecklem and Marianne Appel	1943		

== Arizona ==
Following is a list of United States post office murals created in Arizona.

Location	Mural title	Image	Artist	Date	Notes	NRHP listed
United States Post Office, Phoenix, Arizona	Communication During the Period of Exploration		Oscar Berninghaus	1939		83002993
United States Post Office, Phoenix, Arizona	Spanish Explorers and American Indians		Oscar Berninghaus	1939		83002993
United States Post Office, Phoenix, Arizona	Progress of the Pioneer, Crossing the Desert		LaVerne Nelson Black	1937		83002993
United States Post Office, Phoenix, Arizona	Progress of the Pioneer, the Arrival of the U.S. Mail Coach		LaVerne Nelson Black	1937		83002993
Safford	History of the Gila Valley		Seymour Fogel	1942	six murals	

== Colorado ==
A review of murals in Colorado's post offices found there were no frescos, but rather all had been painted on canvas.

== Delaware ==
Following is a list of United States post office murals created in Delaware.

Location	Mural title	Image	Artist	Date	Notes	NRHP listed
Dover	Harvest, Spring and Summer		William D. White	1937	Presently in Wesley Methodist Church, Lockermann Station Educational Building. Funded by TRAP, this mural includes several panels	
Harrington	Men Hoeing		Eve Salisbury	1941	wax tempera	
New Castle	William Penn Welcomed at New Castle		J. Scott Williams	1938	oil on canvas	
Rehoboth Beach	Frontier Mail		Karl Knaths	1940	oil on canvas	
Selbyville	Chicken Farm		William H. Calfee	1942	oil and tempera	
Wilmington	Chemistry and Industry		Herman Zimmerman	1938	oil on canvas	

== Hawaii ==
Following is a list of United States post office murals created in Hawaii.

Location	Mural title	Image	Artist	Date	Notes	NRHP listed
Schofield Barracks Branch	Primitive Communication		Roy King	1943	painted on wood	

== Idaho ==
Following is a list of United States post office murals created in Idaho.

Location	Mural title	Image	Artist	Date	Notes	NRHP listed
Blackfoot Main Post Office, in Blackfoot	The Arrival Celebration		Andrew Standing Soldier	1939	Five-panel mural addressing Federal governments public works and arts programs as efforts to help the community in times of economic emergency. It was painted for $2,000.	1989
Buhl	Snake River Ferry		Richard Guy Walton	1941		1989
Burley	Pioneer on the Oregon Trail along the Snake River		Elizabeth Lochrie	1938		
Kellogg	Discovery	Mine Rescue, Martin's original proposal	Fletcher Martin	1941	Martin's original proposal, Mine Rescue (1939), was deemed too controversial. It is now in the Smithsonian American Art Museum.	1990
Preston Main Post Office, in Preston	The Battle of Bear River		Edmund J. Fitzgerald	1941	Depicts U.S. cavalry attacking and burning a Native American village. Approximately 5 by 12 feet (1.5 m × 3.7 m) in size.	1989
St. Anthony	The Fur Traders		Elizabeth Lochrie	1939		

== Montana ==
Following is a list of United States post office murals created in Montana.

Location	Mural title	Image	Artist	Date	Notes	NRHP listed
Billings Post Office and Courthouse, in Billings	Trailing Cattle		Leo J. Beaulaurier	1942		
Deer Lodge	James and Granville Stuart Prospecting in Deer Lodge Valley – 1858		Verona Burkhard	1939		
Dillon	News from the States		Elizabeth Lochrie	1938		
Glasgow Post Office and Courthouse, in Glasgow	Montana's Progress		Forrest Hill	1942	72" x 168" painting that earned the artist $1,250	1986
Hamilton	Flat Head War Party		Henry Meloy	1942	oil on canvas	
Sidney	General Sully at Yellowstone		J.K. Ralston	1942		

== Nevada ==
Following is a list of United States post office murals created in Nevada.

Location	Mural title	Image	Artist	Date	Notes	NRHP listed
Lovelock	The Uncovering of the Comstock Lode		Ejnar Hansen	1940		1990
Winnemucca	Cattle Roundup		Polly Duncan	1940		1990
Yerington	Homestead on the Plain		Adolph Gottlieb	1941	oil on canvas; winner of the 48-State Mural Competition	1990

== New Hampshire ==
Following is a list of United States post office murals created in New Hampshire.

Location	Mural title	Image	Artist	Date	Notes	NRHP listed
Lebanon	Rural New Hampshire		Charles Kaesalau	1939	oil on canvas	
Milford	Lumberman Log-Rolling		Philip von Saltza	1940	oil on canvas, winner of the 48-State Mural Competition	
Peterborough	New Hampshire Post in Winter		Marguerite Zorach	1938		1986
Plymouth	John Balch-First Post Rider of Plymouth		R. Crawford Livingston	1938	fresco	
Wolfeboro	New Hampshire Sugar Camp		Andrew Winter	1938		

== New Mexico ==
Following is a list of United States post office murals created in New Mexico.

Location	Mural title	Image	Artist	Date	Notes	NRHPlisted
Federal Building and United States Courthouse Albuquerque	The Pueblo Rebellion of 1680		Loren Mozley		oil on canvas, TRAP, probably in Old Post Office until c. 1972	1980
Clovis	New Mexican Town		Paul Lantz	1937		
Deming Main Post Office, Deming	Mountains and Yucca		Kenneth M. Adams	1937	mural featured on 2019 Post Office Murals stamp set	1990
US Post Office-Portales Main, in Portales	Buffalo Range		Theodore Van Soelen	1938		1990
Raton	First Mail Crossing Raton Pass		Joseph A. Fleck	1936		
Raton	Unloading the Mail in Raton		Joseph A. Fleck	1936		
Roswell Post Office and Courthouse Roswell	Justice Tempered with Mercy — Uphold the Right, Prevent the Wrong		Emil Bisttram	1936	TRAP, begun under PWAP, moved to ABQ courthouse in 1983	
US Post Office-Truth or Consequences Main, in Truth or Consequences; Geronimo Springs station	Indian Bear Dance		Boris Deutsch	1938	winner of the 48-State Mural Competition, formerly called Hot Springs, New Mexico	

== North Dakota ==
Following is a list of United States post office murals created in North Dakota.

Location	Mural title	Image	Artist	Date	Notes	NRHP listed
Langdon	Indians Demanding Wagon Toll		Leo Beaulaurier	1939	oil on canvas	
New Rockford	Advance Guard of the West		Edward Buk Ulreich	1940	oil on canvas; winner of the 48-State Mural Competition	1989
Rugby	Rugby, the Geographical Center of North America		Kenneth Callahan	1943	oil on canvas	1989

== Oregon ==
Following is a list of United States post office murals created in Oregon.

Location	Mural title	Image	Artist	Date	Notes	NRHP listed
Burns	Cattle Roundup		Jack Wilkinson	1941	oil on canvas; winner of the 48-State Mural Competition	
Eugene	Willamette Valley Lumber, Farming and Husbandry		Carl Morris	1943		
Grants Pass	Rogue River Indians		Louis DeMott Bunce	1938	tempera	
Grants Pass	Early and Contemporary Industries		Eric Lamade	1938	tempera	
Newburg	Early Mail Carriers in the West		Rockwell Carey	1937	oli on canvas	
Ontario	Trail to Oregon		Edmond J Fitzgerald	1938	oil on canvas	
Portland	Post Rider		Paul Grellert	1936	destroyed	
Saint Johns	Development of St. Johns		John Ballator	1936	oil on canvas; several murals	
Saint Johns	Development of St. Johns		Eric Lamade	1936	oil on canvas; several murals	
Saint Johns	Development of St. Johns		Louis DeMott Bunce	1936	oil on canvas; several murals	
Salem	Builders of Salem		Andrew McD. Vincent	1942	oil on canvas	
Tillamook	Captain Gray Entering Tillamook Bay		Lucia Wiley	1943	Fresco secco	

== Puerto Rico ==
Following is a list of United States post office murals created in Puerto Rico.

Location	Mural title	Image	Artist	Date	Notes	NRHP listed
Mayagüez	The Indian Mail System		Jose Maduro	1940		
Mayagüez	Receipt of the First Official Spanish Mail in the Island of Puerto Rico in 1541		Jose Maduro	1940		

== Rhode Island ==
Following is a list of United States post office murals created in Rhode Island.

Location	Mural title	Image	Artist	Date	Notes	NRHP listed
Apponaug	Apponaug Fishermen		Paul Sample	1942	oil on canvas	
East Providence	The Hurricane		Eugene Kingman	1939	oil on wall	
East Providence	Seeconk River		Eugene Kingman	1939	oil on wall	
East Providence	East Providence		Eugene Kingman	1939	oil on wall	
East Providence	The Map		Eugene Kingman	1939	oil on wall	
East Providence	After the Storm		Eugene Kingman	1939	oil on wall	
Wakefield	Activities of the Narragansett Planters		Ernest Hamlin Baker	1940	oil on canvas	

== South Dakota ==
Following is a list of United States post office murals created in South Dakota.

Location	Mural title	Image	Artist	Date	Notes	NRHP listed
Beresford	Spirit of Beresford		David McCosh	1942	oil on canvas	
Flandreau	Wheat in the Shock		Matthew Ziegler	1940	oil on canvas; winner of the 48-State Mural Competition	
Mobridge	Return from the Fields		Elof Wedin	1938	oil on canvas	
Sturgis	The Fate of a Mail Carrier – Charlie Nolan – 1876		J.K. Ralston	1939	oil on canvasl; moved to new post office in 1998	
Webster	The First White Man in South Dakota		Irvin Shope	1939	oil on canvas	

== Utah ==
Following is a list of United States post office murals created in Utah.

Location	Mural title	Image	Artist	Date	Notes	NRHP listed
Beaver Main Post Office, Beaver	Life on the Plains		John Beauchamp	1943	oil on canvas	
Helper	Western Town		Jenne Magafan	1941	oil on canvas; winner of the 48-State Mural Competition	
Provo	Early and Modern Provo		Everett Thorpe	1942	oil on canvas	

== Vermont ==
Following is a list of United States post office murals created in Vermont.

Location	Mural title	Image	Artist	Date	Notes	NRHP listed
Northfield	Skiers, Maple Sugar, Agriculture		Charles Daugherty	1939	oil on canvas	
Northfield	Granite		Charles Daugherty	1939	oil on canvas	
Rutland	Early History of Vermont		Stephen Belaski	1937	oil on canvas	
Saint Albans	Haying		Philip von Saltza	1939	oil on canvas	
Saint Albans	Sugaring Off		Philip von Saltza	1939	oil on canvas	
White River Junction	Vermont Industries		S. Douglass Crockwell	1937	oil on canvas	
Woodstock	Cycle of Development of Woodstock		Bernadine Custer	1940	oil on canvas	

== Virgin Islands ==
Following is a list of United States post office murals created in the United States Virgin Islands.

Location	Mural title	Image	Artist	Date	Notes	NRHP listed
Charlotte Amalie	The Virgin Islands, U.S. – The Outer World Significance		Stevan Dohanos	1941	tempera	
Charlotte Amalie	The Virgin Islands, U.S. – The Leisurely Native Tempo		Stevan Dohanos	1941	tempera	

== Wyoming ==
Following is a list of United States post office murals created in Wyoming.

Location	Mural title	Image	Artist	Date	Notes	NRHPlisted
Casper	The Fertile Land Remembers		Louise Emerson Ronnebeck	1938	oil on canvas; originally located in the Worland Post Office.	
Greybull	Chuckwagon Serenade		Manuel Bromberg	1940	tempera; winner of the 48-State Mural Competition	
Kemmerer	Cretaceous Landscape		Eugene Kingman	1938	oil on canvas	
Kemmerer	Excavation		Eugene Kingman	1938	oil on canvas	
Kemmerer	Tertiary Aquatic Life		Eugene Kingman	1938	oil on canvas	
Powell	Powell's Agriculture Resulting for the Shoshone Irrigation Project		Verona Burkhard	1938	oil on canvas	
Riverton	Farm Scene		George Vander Sluis	1942	oil on canvas	

== See also ==
- Section of Painting and Sculpture
- Treasury Relief Art Project
- United States post office murals
- List of Federal Art Project artists
- List of New Deal murals
- List of post offices in the United States
- List of New Deal sculpture
