= List of United States post office murals in Minnesota =

Following is a list of United States post office murals created in Minnesota between 1934 and 1943.

Location	Mural title	Image	Artist	Date	Notes	NRHP listed
Breckenridge	Arrival of the Rural Mail		Robert Allaway	1938		
Caledonia	Hog Raising		Edmund Lewandowski	1942	oil on canvas	
Cambridge	People of the Soil		Seymour Fogel	1940		
Chisholm	Discovery of Ore		Betty Carney	1941		
Ely	Iron-Ore Mines		Elsa Jemne	1941	tempera	
Ely	Wilderness		Elsa Jemne	1941	tempera	
Grand Rapids	Life in Grand Rapids and the Upper Mississippi		James Watrous	1940		
Hastings	Arrival of the Fall Catalogue		Richard Haines	1938	oil on canvas	
Hutchinson	The Hutchinson Singers		Elsa Jemne	1942	egg tempera on plaster	
International Falls	Early Logging at Koochiching Falls		Lucia Wiley	1943		
Litchfield	Street Scene		Elof Wedin	1937		
Long Prairie	Gathering Wild Rice		Lucia Wiley	1939		
Marshall	Pioneers Arriving in Marshall by Wagon Train		Henry Holstrom	1938		
Morris	Gager's Trading Post on the Wadsworth Trail		Alfred Sessler	1943		
North St. Paul	Production		Donald Humphrey	1941	tempera on plaster, winner of the 48-State Mural Competition	
Sauk Centre	Threshing Wheat		Richard Jansen	1942		
St. James	Indian Hunters and Rice Gatherers		Margaret Martin	1940		
Wabasha	The Smoke Message		Allan Thomas	1939	oil on canvas	
Wayzata	Wayzata (Pines of the North)		Ruth Grotenrath	1947		
White Bear Lake	Early Voyageurs at Portage		Nellie G. Best	1940	tempera	
