= United States post office murals =

New Deal-era public art

Progress of Industry (1934) by Charles W. Ward, at the Clarkson S. Fisher Federal Building and United States Courthouse in Trenton, New Jersey

United States post office murals are notable examples of New Deal art produced during the years 1934–1943.

They were commissioned through a competitive process by the United States Department of the Treasury. Some 1,400 murals were created for federal post office buildings in more than 1,300 U.S. cities. Murals still extant are the subject of efforts by the U.S. Postal Service to preserve and protect them.

In 2019, the USPS issued a sheet of 10 Forever stamps commemorating the murals; the murals were from the post offices of Piggott, AR; Anadarko, OK; Florence, CO; Deming, NM; and Rockville, MD.

== History ==
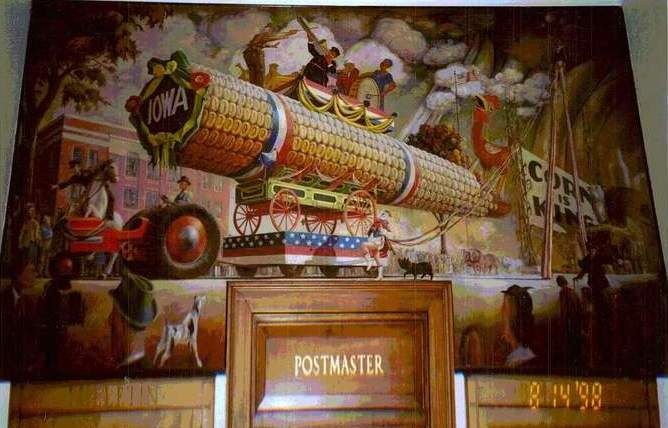
The Corn Parade (1941) by Orr C. Fisher, in the Mount Ayr, Iowa, post office

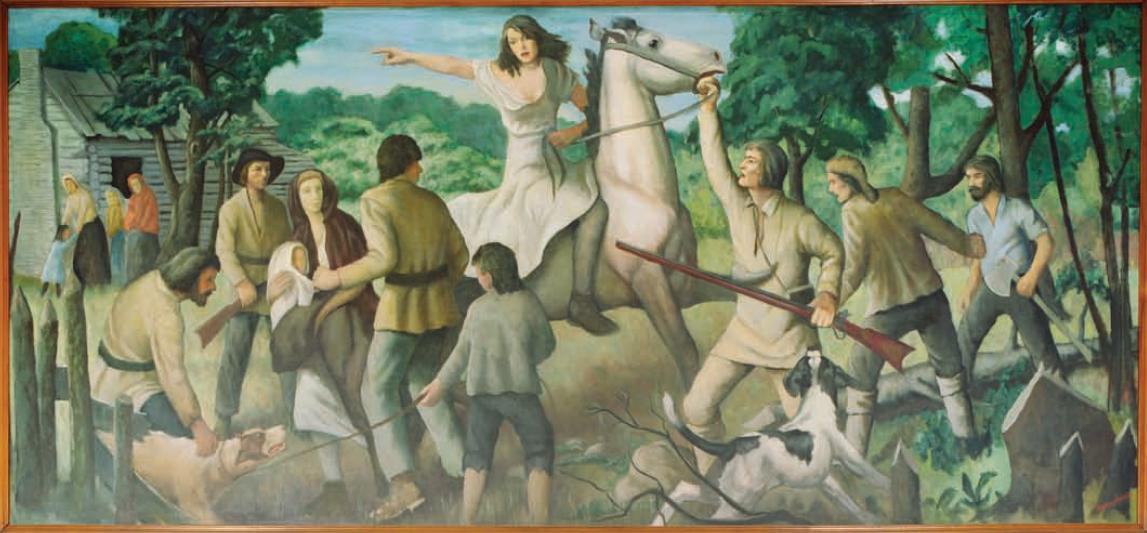
Rachel Silverthorne's Ride (1938) by John W. Beauchamp, in the Muncy, Pennsylvania, post office

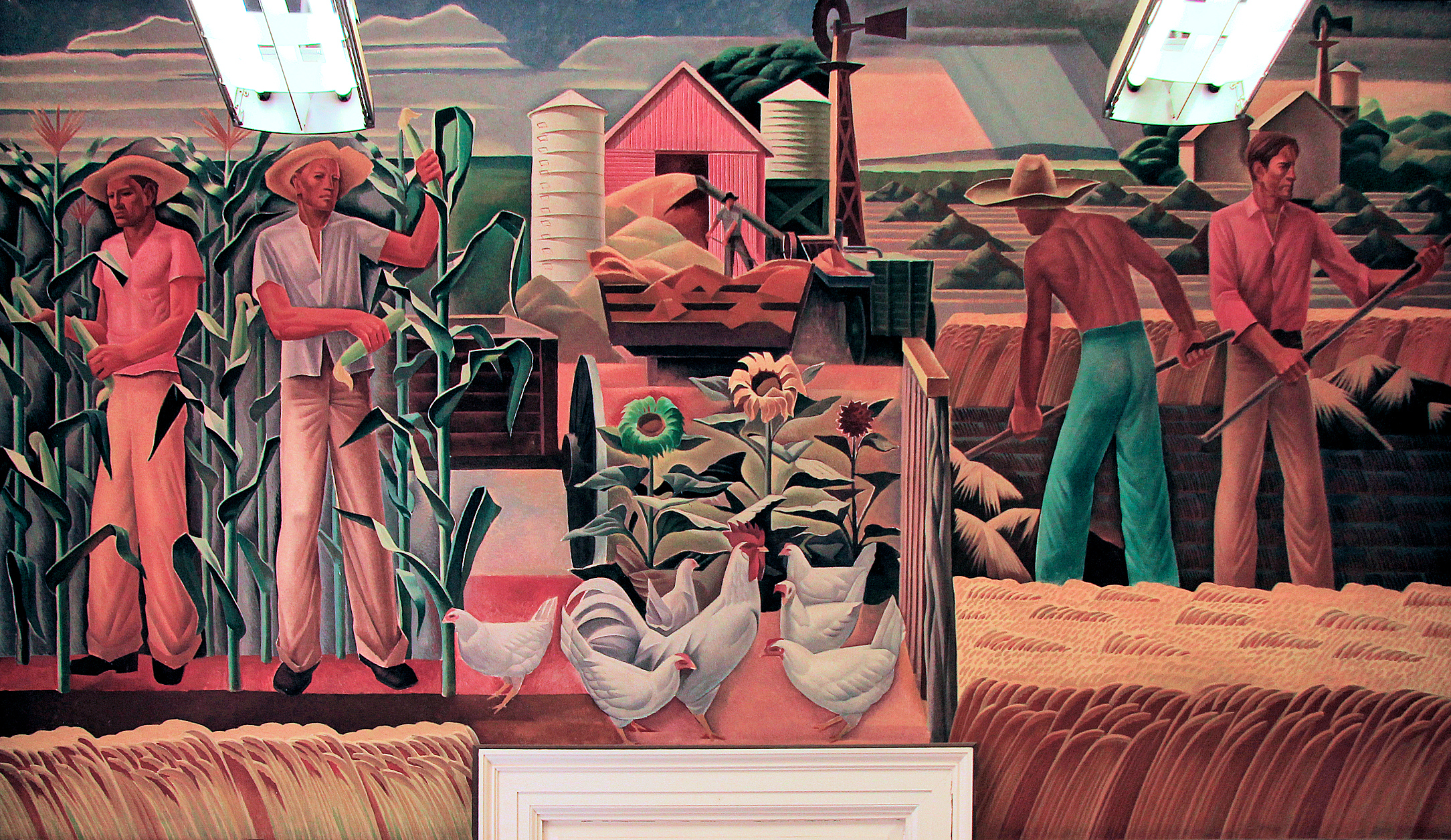
Texas Farm (1940) by Julius Woeltz, in the Elgin, Texas, post office

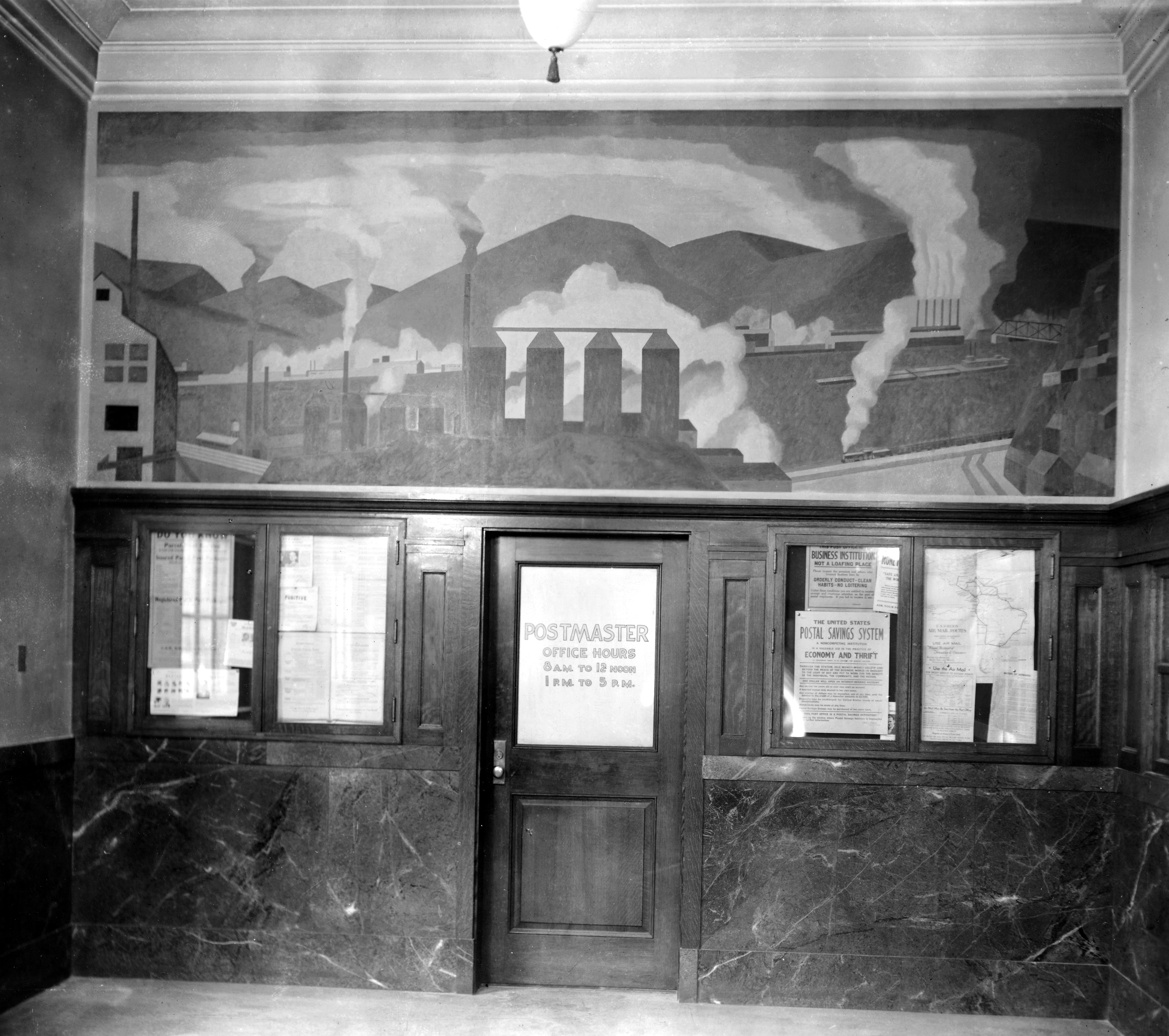

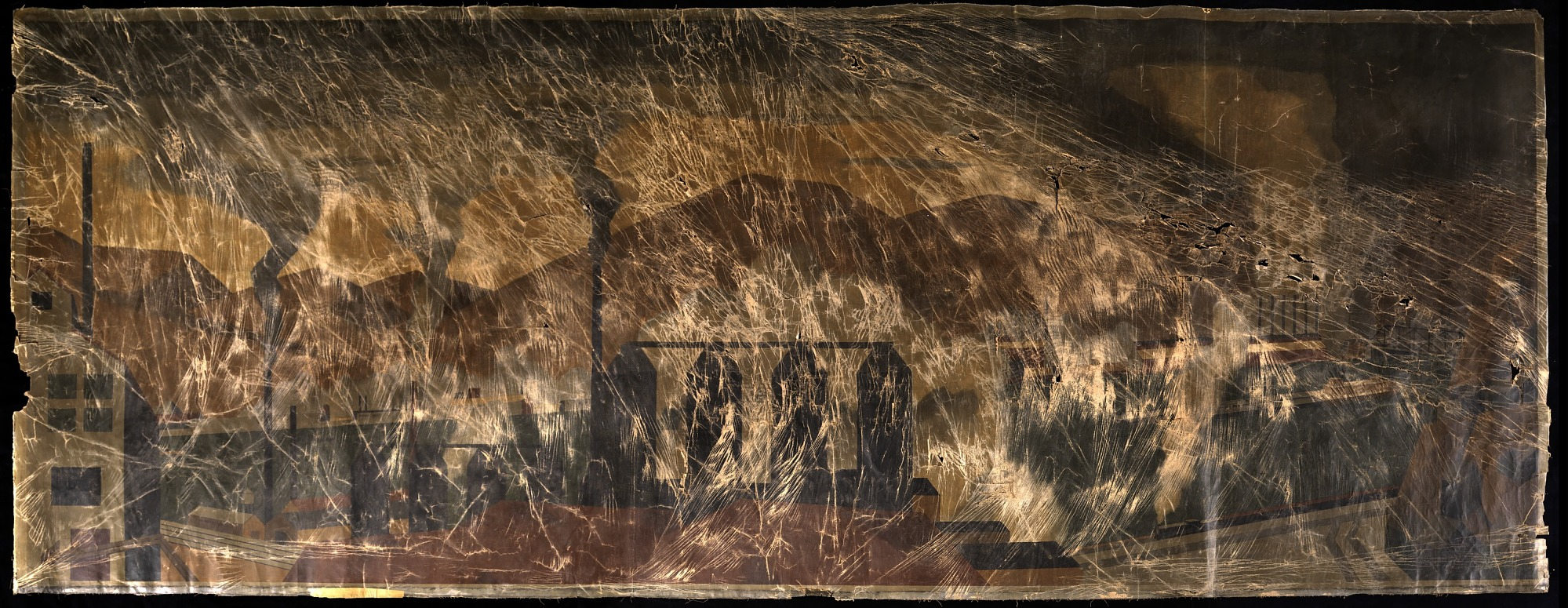
Western Pennsylvania (1938), Niles Spencer's Precisionist mural for the post office in Aliquippa, Pennsylvania, is now in storage at the Smithsonian American Art Museum

As one of the projects in the New Deal during the Great Depression in the United States, the Public Works of Art Project (1933–1934) was developed to bring artist workers back into the job market and assure the American public that better financial times were on the way. In 1933, nearly $145 million in public funds was appropriated for the construction of federal buildings, such as courthouses, schools, libraries, post offices and other public structures, nationwide. Under the direction of the Public Works of Art Project, the agency oversaw the production of 15,660 works of art by 3,750 artists. These included 700 murals on public display. With the ending of the Public Works of Art Project in the summer of 1934, it was decided that the success of the program should be extended by founding the Section of Painting and Sculpture (renamed the Section of Fine Arts in 1938) under the U.S. Treasury Department, through Treasury Secretary Morgenthau's executive order of October 14, 1934. The Section of Painting and Sculpture was initiated to commission 1,400 murals in federal post offices buildings in more than 1,300 cities across America.

The Section focused on reaching as many American citizens as possible. Since the local post office seemed to be the most frequented government building by the public, the Section requested that the murals, approximately 12 by 5 feet (3.7 by 1.5 m) oil paintings on canvas, be placed on the walls of the newly constructed post offices exclusively. It was recommended that 1% of the money budgeted for each post office be set aside for the creation of the murals.

The Treasury Relief Art Project (1935–1938), which provided artistic decoration for existing Federal buildings, produced a smaller number of post office murals. TRAP was established with funds from the Works Progress Administration. The Section supervised the creative output of TRAP, and selected a master artist for each project. Assistants were then chosen by the artist from the rolls of the WPA Federal Art Project.

The Section and the Treasury Relief Art Project were overseen by Edward Bruce, who had directed the Public Works of Art Project. They were commission-driven public work programs that employed artists to beautify American government buildings, strictly on the basis of quality. This contrasts with the work-relief mission of the Federal Art Project (1935–1943) of the Works Progress Administration, the largest of the New Deal art projects. So great was its scope and cultural impact that the term "WPA" is often mistakenly used to describe all New Deal art, including the U.S. post office murals. "New Deal artwork" is a more accurate term to describe the works of art created under the federal art programs of that period.

The murals are the subject of efforts by the U.S. Postal Service to preserve and protect them. This is particularly important and problematical as some of them have disappeared or deteriorated. Some are installed in buildings that are worth far less than the artwork.

== Process ==
Whereas the Public Works of Art Project paid artists hourly wages, the Section of Fine Arts program awarded contracts to artists based on works entered in both regional and national competitions. For this purpose, the country was divided into 16 regions.

Artists submitted sketches anonymously to a committee of their peers for judging. The committees, composed of art critics, fellow artists and architects, selected the finest works. These were then sent, along with the artists' names in sealed envelopes, to the Section of Fine Arts for ultimate selection. This anonymity was to ensure that all competing artists had an equal opportunity of winning a commission. However, many local painters felt they were being kept out of the process, with the majority of contracts going to the better known artists.

Artists were asked to paint in an "American scene" style, depicting ordinary citizens in a realistic manner. Abstract art, modern art, social realism, and allegory were discouraged. Artists were also encouraged to produce works that would be appropriate to the communities where they were to be located and to avoid controversial subjects. Projects were closely scrutinized by the Section for style and content, and artists were paid only after each stage in the creative process was approved.

== Concerns ==
The selection of out-of-state artists sometimes generated concerns, such as stereotypes of rural people being portrayed merely as hicks and hayseeds and not having the murals express their cultural values and work ethics. Many residents of small towns, most notably in the Southern states, resented the portrayal of rural lifestyles by artists who had never visited the areas where their artwork would be displayed.

In Arkansas, 19 post offices received murals, with two post offices, one in Berryville, Carroll County and another in Monticello, Drew County, receiving sculpture. For seven decades following the Civil War, Arkansas had been perceived as the epitome of poverty and illiteracy by the rest of the nation. Many Arkansans had dealt with hardship and tribulation on a daily basis and the coming of the Depression had not made life easier. Although the sketches of such renowned artists as Thomas Hart Benton and Joseph P. Vorst were based on actual events and people encountered during their travels across the state, they sometimes focused on the worst aspects of life in these rural towns.

This was not the legacy that Arkansans wished to leave their children and grandchildren. They wanted the murals to give hope to the younger generation in overcoming adversity, and provide inspiration for a brighter future with better things to come. In some instances, artists were asked to submit multiple drawings before being accepted by the community. When approval was given by the local residents on the artists’ final sketches, work on the murals proceeded, much to the satisfaction of all those involved.

== Notable artists ==
- Ida Abelman
- Kenneth Miller Adams
- Dewey Albinson
- Lee Allen
- Edmund Archer (artist)
- Paul Theodore Arlt
- Victor Arnautoff
- Ernest Hamlin Baker
- Belle Baranceanu
- Edith Barry
- Gifford Beal
- Rainey Bennett
- Lester W. Bentley
- Oscar E. Berninghaus
- Theresa Bernstein
- Auriel Bessemer
- Edward Biberman
- George Biddle
- Henry Billings
- Julien Binford
- Emil Bisttram
- Arnold Blanch
- Lucile Blanch
- Lucienne Bloch
- Acee Blue Eagle
- Peter Blume
- Ernest L. Blumenschein
- Aaron Bohrod
- Louis Bouche
- Ray Boynton
- Edgar Britton
- Manuel Bromberg
- Alexander Brook
- Conrad Buff
- Byron Burford
- Paul Cadmus
- Kenneth Callahan
- Clarence Holbrook Carter
- Daniel Celentano
- Jean Charlot
- Minna Citron
- Frederick Conway
- Howard Cook
- Dean Cornwell
- John Edward Costigan
- Arthur Covey
- Gustaf Dalstrom
- James Daugherty
- Horace Day
- Boris Deutsch
- Maynard Dixon
- Margaret Dobson
- Stevan Dohanos
- Olin Dows
- Ethel Edwards
- Stephen Etnier
- Philip Evergood
- William Dean Fausett
- Paul Faulkner
- Denman Fink
- John Kelly Fitzpatrick
- Joseph Fleck
- Seymour Fogel
- Helen Katharine Forbes
- Frances Foy
- Jared French
- Arnold Friedman
- Lee Gatch
- Robert Franklin Gates
- Arthur Getz
- Paul L. Gill
- Lloyd Lozes Goff
- Anne Goldthwaite
- Xavier Gonzalez
- Bertram Goodman
- Adolph Gottlieb
- Sante Graziani
- Gordon Grant
- Grace Greenwood
- Marion Greenwood
- Davenport Griffen
- William Gropper
- Philip Guston
- Robert Gwathmey
- Richard Haines
- Sally Haley
- Edith Hamlin
- George Matthews Harding
- Charles Russell Hardman
- George Albert Harris
- Abraham Harriton
- Ernest Martin Hennings
- Charles Trumbo Henry
- Natalie Smith Henry
- Victor Higgins
- George Snow Hill
- Stefan Hirsch
- Alexandre Hogue
- Milton Horn
- Victoria Hutson Huntley
- Peter Hurd
- Dahlov Ipcar
- Reva Jackman
- Mitchell Jamieson
- Edwin Boyd Johnson
- J. Theodore Johnson
- Allen Jones
- Joe Jones
- Sheffield Kagy
- Joseph Kaplan
- Charles Kassler
- Rockwell Kent
- Roy King
- Eugene Kingman
- Alison Mason Kingsbury
- Vance Kirkland
- Georgina Klitgaard
- Karl Knaths
- Albert Kotin
- Edward Laning
- Robert Laurent
- Pietro Lazzari
- Thomas C. Lea III
- Doris Lee
- Hilton Leech
- Robert Lepper
- Edmund Lewandowski
- Arthur Lidov
- Abraham Lishinsky
- Elizabeth Lochrie
- Michael Loew
- Frank Long
- Peppino Mangravite
- Ila Mae McAfee
- Ambrose McCarthy
- John McCrady
- Musa McKim
- Miriam McKinnie
- Kindred McLeary
- Ludwig Mactarian
- Ethel Magafan
- Herman Maril
- Reginald Marsh
- David Stone Martin
- Fletcher Martin
- Frank Mechau
- Paul Meltsner
- Ross Moffett
- Stephen Mopope
- F. Luis Mora
- Carl Morris
- Archibald Motley
- Archie Musick
- James Michael Newell
- Dale Nichols
- Emrich Nicholson
- William C. Palmer
- Alzira Peirce
- Waldo Peirce
- Ernest Peixotto
- Guy Pène du Bois
- Bernard Perlin
- Jose Moya del Pino
- Joseph Pollet
- Dorothy Wagner Puccinelli
- J. K. Ralston
- Anton Refregier
- Edna Reindel
- Daniel Rhodes
- Louis Leon Ribak
- George Rickey
- Boardman Robinson
- Paul Herman Rohland
- Louise Emerson Ronnebeck
- Charles Rosen
- Andrée Ruellan
- Olive Rush
- Paul Sample
- Birger Sandzén
- Michael Sarisky
- Suzanne Scheuer
- Martyl Schweig
- Elise Seeds
- Ben Shahn
- Bernarda Bryson Shahn
- Henrietta Shore
- Mitchell Siporin
- John French Sloan
- Jacob Getlar Smith
- William Sommer
- Moses Soyer
- Raphael Soyer
- Ethel Spears
- Francis C. Speight
- Niles Spencer
- Harry Sternberg
- Ray Strong
- Agnes Tait
- Lorin Thompson
- Edward Buk Ulreich
- Stuyvesant Van Veen
- Philip von Saltza
- James Watrous
- Elof Wedin
- W. Richard West, Sr.
- Jessie Wilber
- Lucia Wiley
- Lumen Martin Winter
- Bernard Zakheim
- Marguerite Zorach
- Milford Zornes
- Jirayr Zorthian

== 48-State Mural Competition ==
A competition for one mural to be painted in a post office in each of the 48 states (plus Washington, D.C.) was held in November 1939 at the Corcoran Gallery. The jury selecting the winners was composed of four artists: Maurice Sterne (Chairman), Henry Varnum Poor, Edgar Miller, and Olin Dows. Winners were chosen from the original mural studies, not completed murals; community response to artist proposals sometimes resulted in revised designs.

Winners of 48-State Mural Competition
Artist	Title		Image (Note: From the holdings of the Smithsonian American Art Museum)	City	State
Artist	Original	Revised	Image	City	State
Robert Gwathmey	Fish for the Interior	The Countryside (Note: Local officials disliked the mural when it was installed; later denounced in the 1970s for "dehumanizing and offensive" depiction of Black Americans. Remains on display in its original location.)		Eutaw	Alabama
Seymour Fogel	Indian Dance	History of the Gila Valley (Note: Subject revised from original at the demand of local citizens who were still resentful about Apache raids. Revised set of six murals depict settlers with European heritage arriving, exploring, and settling the region.)		Safford	Arizona
Joseph P. Vorst	Rural Arkansas (Note: Reworked after local citizens objected to the original concept, which is held at the Smithsonian American Art Museum. As installed, mural depicts industrial activities in Paris instead of focusing on agriculture.)			Paris	Arkansas
Lew E. Davis	Indian Pony Round	Early Spanish Caballeros (Note: Reworked from a concept initially submitted for the post office in Safford, Arizona. Retitled Early Spanish Caballeros; moved to and displayed at the Milliken Museum, although ownership was transferred to the Smithsonian American Art Museum.)		Los Banos	California
John H. Fraser	North Platte Country Against the Mountains	Littleton, Colorado (Note: The mural was rediscovered in the 1970s after it had been removed and "rolled up like a piece of wallpaper"; it was cleaned and restored in 1985, and is now on display in the Littleton City Council chambers.)		Littleton	Colorado
A. S. Tobey	Stop of Hooker's Band in East Hartford before Crossing River (Note: Damaged; half remains at original location in East Hartford branch post office. Study held by Smithsonian American Art Museum. USPS announced it would be moving from the 850 Main Street building in early 2020; mural's disposition unknown.)			East Hartford	Connecticut
William H. Calfee	Saw Mill	Chicken Farm		Selbyville	Delaware
Thomas I. Laughlin	Seascape	Scene of Town (Note: Moved to new post office in 1989.)		De Funiak Springs	Florida
Elizabeth Terrell	The Ploughman (Note: Has since been moved to 1898 railroad depot in Olde Town Conyers. Study held by Smithsonian American Art Museum.)			Conyers	Georgia
Fletcher Martin	Mine Rescue	Discovery (Note: Citizens of Kellogg objected to original theme, which is held by Smithsonian American Art Museum. Revised mural features Noah Kellogg, a frontiersman and prospector, discovering the Bunker Hill Mine; his donkey is prominently displayed above the postmaster's door.)		Kellogg	Idaho
Edmund Lewandowski	Threshing Grain	On the River		Hamilton	Illinois
Joseph Meert	Harvesting			Spencer	Indiana
Marion Gilmore	Band Concert (Note: Installed May 10, 1941. Study held by Smithsonian American Art Museum.)			Corning	Iowa
Joe Jones	Men and Wheat (Note: Jones painted murals for multiple post offices, all with harvest themes. Study held by Smithsonian American Art Museum.)			Seneca	Kansas
William E. L. Bunn	Mississippi Packets (Note: Bunn lived in Iowa. Study held by Smithsonian American Art Museum.)			Hickman	Kentucky
Laura B. Lewis	County Courthouse	Louisiana Farm (Note: Mural, originally entered in competition for Marfa, Texas, was redesigned with local input. It was lost in 1967 during post office renovations.)		Eunice	Louisiana
Barry Greenbie	River Driving			Dover-Foxcroft	Maine
Alexander Clayton	Three Fishermen and Wild Life Typical of Cecil County			Elkton	Maryland
Jean Watson	A Massachusetts Countryside			Stoughton	Massachusetts
James Calder	Waiting for Mail			Grand Ledge	Michigan
Don Humphrey	Production			North St. Paul	Minnesota
Stuart R. Purser	Ginning Cotton (Note: Study held by Smithsonian American Art Museum.)			Leland	Mississippi
James Baare Turnbull (Note: The artist selected by the jury was Fred Conway. However, because the citizens of Jackson, Missouri requested a more modern representation of their city, James Baare Turnbull's mural Farm (originally intended for Purcell, Oklahoma) was moved to Jackson and retitled.)	Loading Cattle (Note: Study held by Smithsonian American Art Museum.)			Jackson	Missouri
Mordi Gassner	Old Time Pioneers and New			Great Falls	Montana
Philip von Saltza	Wild Horses by Moonlight			Schuyler	Nebraska
Adolph Gottlieb	Homestead on the Plain			Yerington	Nevada
Philip von Saltza	Logging			Milford	New Hampshire
Avery Johnson	Skating on Bonaparte's Pond (Note: Study held by Smithsonian American Art Museum.)			Bordentown	New Jersey
Boris Deutsch	Indian Bear Dance (Note: Study held by Smithsonian American Art Museum.)			Hot Springs	New Mexico
Mary Earley	Down-Rent-War, Around 1845 (Note: Study held by Smithsonian American Art Museum.)			Delhi	New York
Alan Tompkins	Tobacco Harvest			Boone	North Carolina
Edward Buk Ulreich	Advance Guard of the West (Note: Study held by Smithsonian American Art Museum.)			New Rockford	North Dakota
Richard Kenah	Ohio Harvest			Bridgeport	Ohio
Fred Conway (Note: The artist selected by the jury was James Baare Turnbull for Farm. However, because the citizens of Jackson, Missouri requested a more modern representation of their city, Turnbull's mural was moved to Jackson, and Conway's mural originally intended for Jackson, titled Loading Cattle, was moved to Purcell, Oklahoma and retitled.)	The Roundup			Purcell	Oklahoma
Jack Wilkinson	Cattle Stampede	Cattle Thieves Surprised by Posse (Note: Study held by Smithsonian American Art Museum.)		Burns	Oregon
Lorin Thompson, Jr.	Clearing the Land			Mercer	Pennsylvania
Paul Sample	Railway Station			Westerly	Rhode Island
Lee Gatch	Tobacco Industry			Mullins	South Carolina
M. E. Ziegler	Wheat in the Shock (Note: Study held by Smithsonian American Art Museum.)			Flandreau	South Dakota
David Stone Martin	Electrification			Lenoir City	Tennessee
Ethel Edwards	Afternoon on a Texas Ranch (Note: Study held by Smithsonian American Art Museum.)			Lampasas	Texas
Jenne Magafan	Western Town (Note: Study held by Smithsonian American Art Museum.)			Helper	Utah
Barse Miller	Lumber Yard			Island Pond	Vermont
William H. Calfee	Chesapeake Fishermen			Phoebus	Virginia
Richard Haines	Red River Ox Carts			Shelton	Washington
Henry Varnum Poor	Cartoon for Completed Mural in the Department of Interior Building (New)			Washington, D.C.	
Richard Zoellner	West Virginia Landscape (Note: Mural held by Smithsonian American Art Museum.)			Mannington	West Virginia
Charles W. Thwaites	Threshing Barley (Note: Study held by Smithsonian American Art Museum.)			Chilton	Wisconsin
Manuel Bromberg	Chuck Wagon Serenade			Greybull	Wyoming

== See also ==
- List of United States post office murals
- List of United States post offices
- List of New Deal murals

== Bibliography ==
External videos
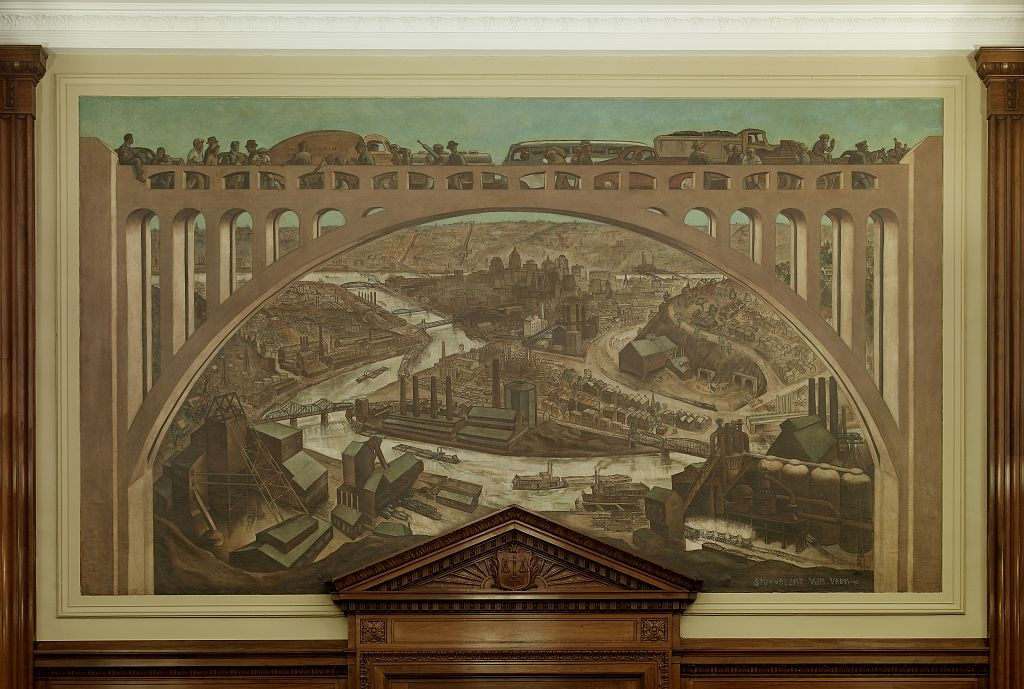
- A Common Canvas- Somerset, Pennsylvania (2:36) Pennsylvania Historical and Museum Commission
- A Common Canvas- Renovo, Pennsylvania (4:46) Pennsylvania Historical and Museum Commission

- Harris, Jonathon. Federal Art and National Culture: The Politics of Identity in New Deal America. Cambridge: Cambridge University Press, 1995.
- Parisi, Philip. The Texas Post Office Murals: Art for the People. College Station, Texas: Texas A&M University Press, 2004.
- Smith, Bradley. The USA: A History in Art. Garden City, New York: Doubleday & Company, 1975.
- Gibson, Lisanne. Managing the People: Art Programs in the American Depression. Queensland, Australia: Journal The Journal of Arts Management, Law, and Society, 2002.
- Marling, Karal Ann. Wall to Wall America: Post Office Murals in the Great Depression. Minneapolis: University of Minnesota Press, 1982.
- Park, Marlene and Gerald E. Markowitz. Democratic Vistas: Post Offices and Public Art in the New Deal. Philadelphia: Temple University Press, 1984.
- Jones, Todd. “Mistaken Murals: The Neglected Story of the Nutmeg State’s New Deal Post Office Art.” Connecticut History Review 59, no. 1 (spring 2020): 40–79.
