= List of United States post offices in New Mexico =

United States post offices operate under the authority of the United States Post Office Department (1792–1971) or the United States Postal Service (since 1971). Historically, post offices were usually placed in a prominent location. Many were architecturally distinctive, including notable buildings featuring Beaux-Arts, Art Deco, and Vernacular architecture. However, modern U.S. post offices were generally designed for functionality rather than architectural style.

Following is a list of United States post offices in New Mexico. Notable post offices include individual buildings, whether still in service or not, which have architectural, historical, or community-related significance. Many of these are listed on the National Register of Historic Places (NRHP) or state and local historic registers.

Post office	City	Date built	Image	Architect	Notes	Ref.
Alamogordo Main Post Office, later Lincoln National Forest Service Building	Alamogordo	1938		Gilbert Stanley Underwood, Louis A. Simon, Neal A. Melick	(Note: No longer used as a post office.) (Note: Listed on the National Register of Historic Places.) (Note: Houses the New Deal murals Sun and Rain, Yucca, and, Sorghum by Peter Kurd.)	
Old Post Office (Albuquerque, New Mexico)	Albuquerque	1908		James Knox Taylor		
United States Post Office (Carlsbad, New Mexico)	Carlsbad	1938				
Old Clovis Post Office, now Carver-Clovis Public Library	Clovis	1931		James A. Wetmore, Louis A. Simon	(Note: Originally housed the New Deal mural, The Jicarilla Apache Trading Post, by La Verne Nelson Black. The mural was relocated to the Carlsbad Museum.)	
Deming Main Post Office	Deming	1936		Louis A. Simon	(Note: Houses the New Deal mural Mountains and Yucca by Kenneth Adams.)	
United States Post Office (Gallup, New Mexico)	Gallup	1933		James A. Wetmore	(Note: Originally housed three New Deal murals by Warren Rollins, which have since been relocated out of state.)	
Old Las Vegas Post Office	Las Vegas	1927		James A. Wetmore		
Los Alamos United States Post Office	Los Alamos	1948		W. C. Kruger and Associates		
Portales Main Post Office	Portales	1936–1937		Louis A. Simon, Neal A. Melick	(Note: Houses the New Deal mural Buffalo Range by Theodore Van Soelen.)	
United States Post Office (Silver City, New Mexico)	Silver City	1934		Louis A. Simon, George O. Von Nerta		
United States Post Office (Truth or Consequences, New Mexico)	Truth or Consequences	1940		Louis A. Simon	(Note: Houses the New Deal mural The Indian Bear Dance by Boris Deutsch.)	
