= Betty Hoag =

American art historian (1914–2002)

- Born: April 28, 1914; Deer Lodge, Montana
- Died: April 3, 2002 (aged 87); Monterey, California
- Education: Stanford University
- Occupations: Historian, museum director
- Mother: Elizabeth Lochrie

Elizabeth Jane Lochrie Hoag McGlynn (28 April 1914 – 3 April 2002), most often known as Betty Hoag, was an American art collector, museum director, and art historian who specialized in painters of California and Hawaii, as well as in the New Deal art of the 1930s. In the 1960s she conducted dozens of oral history interviews with New Deal artists for the Smithsonian's Archives of American Art.

== Biography ==
Hoag was born on April 28, 1914, in Deer Lodge, Montana. Her parents were artist Elizabeth Lochrie and her father, Arthur J. Lochrie, was a former president of the Butte Miner's Bank. She married architect Paul Hoag and settled in West Los Angeles and raised three children. She divorced and moved to Carmel and married painter Thomas McGlynn in 1967. She earned her undergraduate degree from Stanford University and a master's from University of Southern California. (Note: Her master's thesis was on Jules Tavernier and the Monterey art colony: Hoag, Betty Lochrie (February 1967). Jules Tavernier: Monterey's Knight of the Palette (Master's thesis). Los Angeles: University of Southern California.) She was the director of the Triton Museum of Art in Santa Clara, California. From 1967 to 1970, she was research director of the Carmel Art Museum in Carmel.

Hoag died on April 3, 2002, at the Community Hospital of the Monterey Peninsula in Monterey, California, at the age of 88.
