= United States Post Office (Yerington, Nevada) =

- US Post Office--Yerington Main
- U.S. National Register of Historic Places
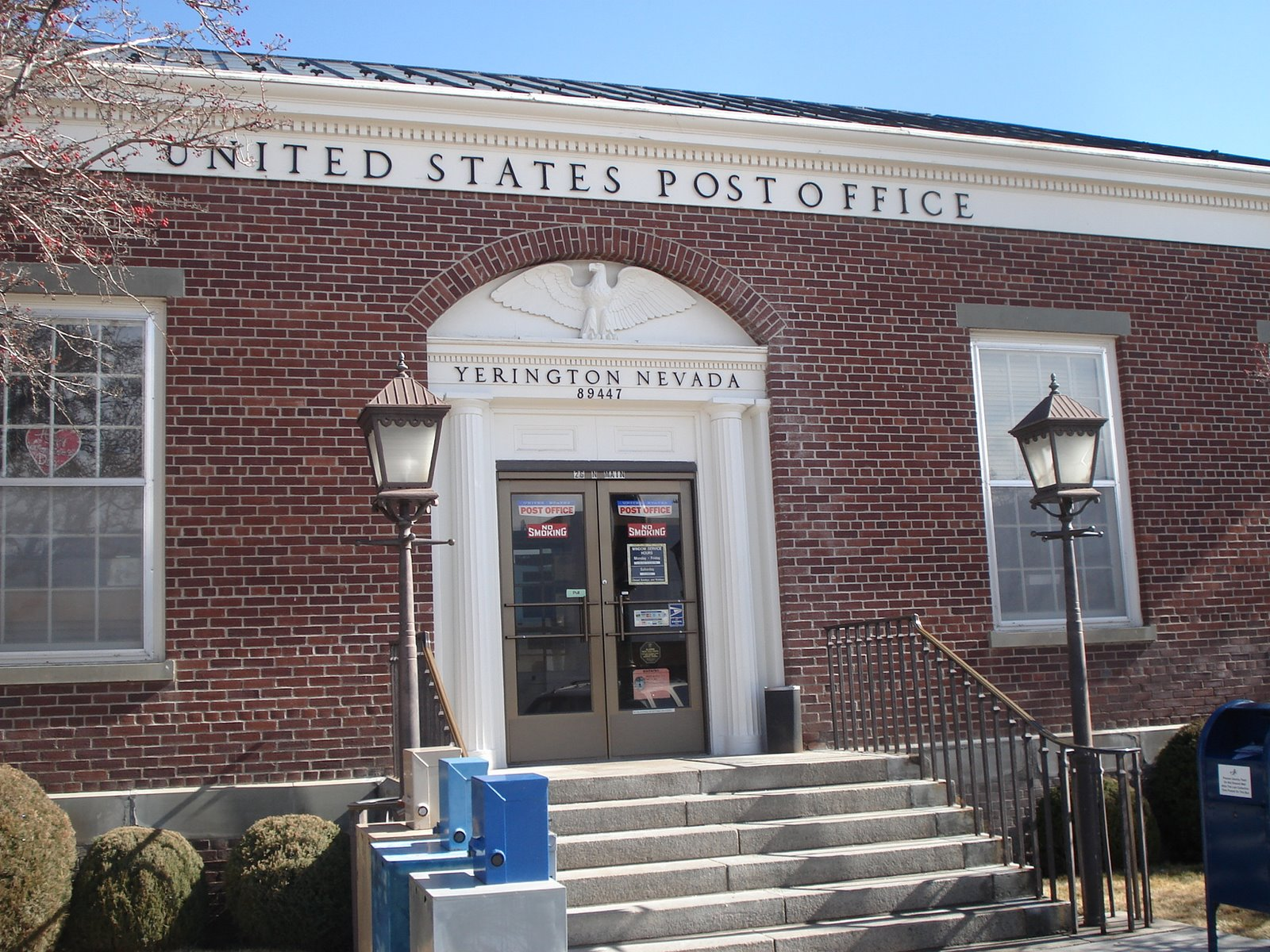

- Location within Nevada Location within the United States
- Location: 28 N. Main St., Yerington, Nevada
- Coordinates: 38°59′17″N 119°9′42″W
- Area: 0.6 acres (0.24 ha)
- Built: 1939
- Architect: Simon, Louis A.; Dow, L.F. & Co.
- Architectural style: Colonial Revival
- MPS: US Post Offices in Nevada MPS
- NRHP reference No.: 90000138
- Added to NRHP: February 28, 1990

US Post Office - Yerington Main is a one-story red brick building in Yerington, Nevada listed on the National Register of Historic Places on February 28, 1990. It is the first and only federally-constructed post office in the city of Yerington. The building was built in 1939 and was designed by Louis A. Simon and L.F. Dow & Co.

== Physical Appearance ==
The building's roof is a copper-clad hipped one. The structure of the establishment consists of concrete footings, basement and floor slab, brick walls, and steel framing. The basement and first floor are separated by a sandstone water table. Sandstone is used in the window sills and lintels. And for the frieze and cornice, and entry architrave, wood is used. A flat built-up tar composition roof covers the back end and the hipped roof over the front portion of the building is clothed by ribbed-copper. The symmetrically arranged front façade is horizontal in orientation. The central entry is divided by 5 bays with 2 window bays on each side. 6 granite steps and granite landing give access to the leading entrance. The main entrance has double aluminum-framed glass panel doors. A 2-panel wooden transom bar is above the doors. ‘YERINGTON NEVADA’ written in bronze letters are attached to the frieze. The bronze letters ‘UNITED STATES POST OFFICE’ are attached at the center of the main entrance.

== Architecture ==
The building does not have a distinctive architectural outfit in the body of statewide architecture, it is the sole structure of this specific style in Yerington city. Just like most of the buildings constructed at the time of the Depression era, the Post Office uses Classical symmetry and proportion.

== Significance ==
The Post Office is notable for the locals for its architecture and politics, and on the state level for art. It was constructed during the Depression era like the other small-town post offices constructed in Nevada. But it is an unaltered example of a small-town post office and federal office building because of its design and standardized plans. The Post Office and the mural show the efforts of the federal government through its public works and art programs to help communities during a period of economic emergency. Adolph Gottlieb's 1941 mural, Homestead on the Plain, is one of only three United States post office murals created in Nevada. It illustrates a significant type, period, and style of artistic expression that connects with the history of its locality.
