= Michael Sarisky =

Michael Aloysius Sarisky was an Ohio artist who lived from 1906 to 1974. Known for portraits and still lifes, his work was collected by the Cleveland Museum of Art. He was commissioned to provide several public works in and around Cleveland Ohio, including the City Airport and the Garfield Memorial (see reference below). He also painted a mural for the Barnesville, Ohio, Post Office . He was once married to Isabel Wilson.
