= Bertram Goodman =

American painter

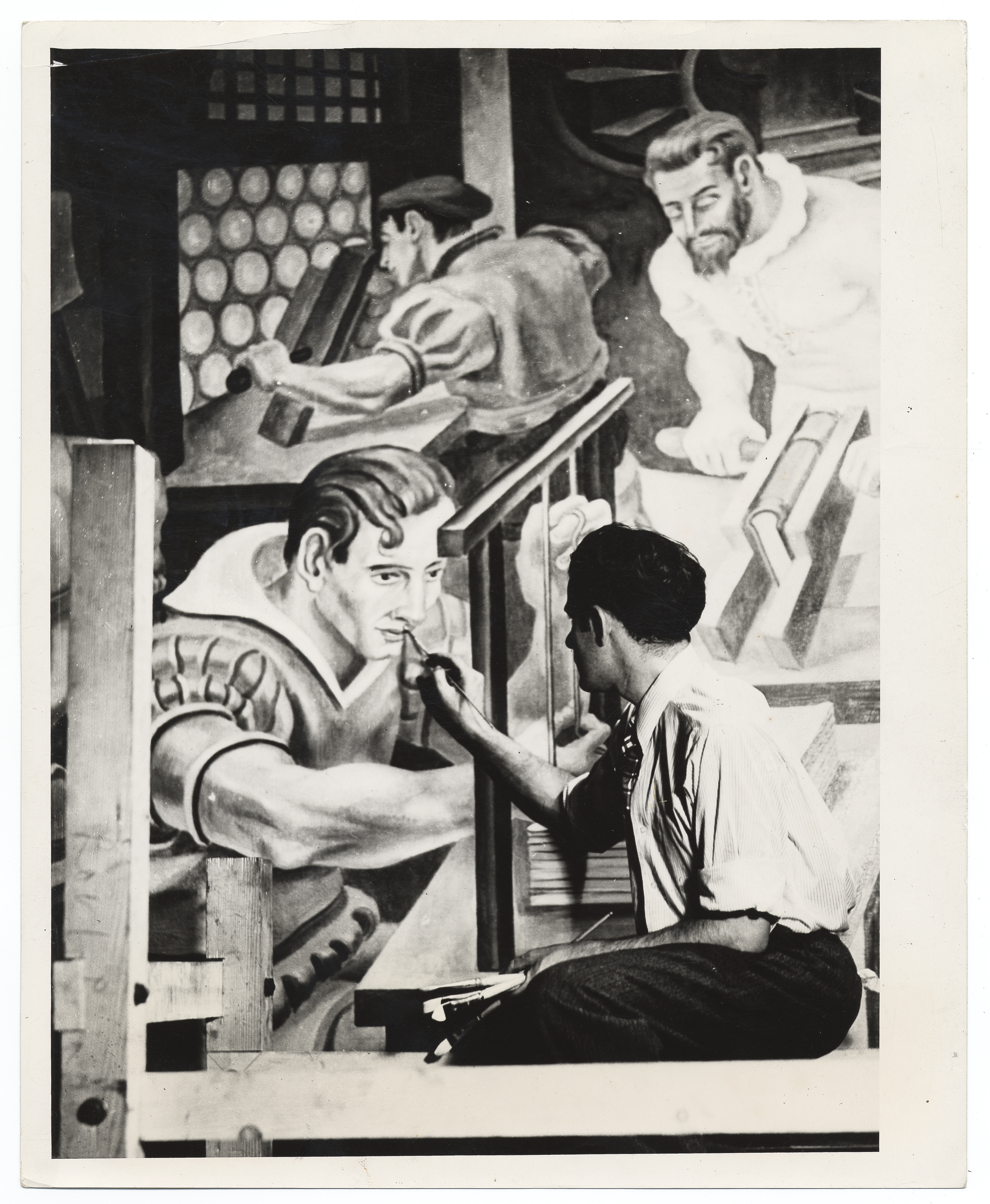
- Bertram Goodman, from the Archives of American Art
- Born: 1904
- Died: 1988 (aged 83–84)
- Education: School of American Sculpture; Art Students League of New York
- Known for: Sculpture, murals

Bertram A. Goodman (1904–1988) was an American artist.

He studied at the School of American Sculpture, and at the Art Students League of New York in 1925. He was a member of the Federal Art Project whose murals included, Evolution of the Book, at Theodore Roosevelt High School, murals at Washington Avenue and Fordham Road in the Bronx as well as Quaker Settlers in Quakertown, Pennsylvania

He was Director of the Artists Equity Association from 1955 to 1956. His work is in the Brooklyn Museum and Albright-Knox Art Gallery.
