= Loren Mozley =

American painter (1905–1989)

Loren Norman Mozley (October 2, 1905 – September 22, 1989) was an artist of the American Southwest. He is known for his New Deal artwork post office mural in Albuquerque, New Mexico that depicts the Pueblo Revolt of 1680. He has other New Deal commissions in Clinton, Oklahoma and Alvin, Texas. His painting Rocks and Cypresses is in Huntington Gallery at the University of Texas. He had a retrospective there in 1978; most of the works shown were landscapes of Mexico, New Mexico and central Texas. In 2013, the Dallas Museum of Art hosted a show of his work called Loren Mozley: Structural Integrity.

He also taught art in Taos, New Mexixo, and once in August 1935 gave John Marin a lift from New York back to New Mexico. Along with Ward Lockwood he helped found the art department at the University of Texas in 1938. He was an expert in Latin American art and also taught at the University of Southern California and National University in Mexico City.

A portrait of Loren Mozley by the artist Andrew Dasburg is in the Nelson-Atkins Museum of Art.
