= United States Post Office (Truth or Consequences, New Mexico) =

- US Post Office--Truth or Consequences Main
- U.S. National Register of Historic Places
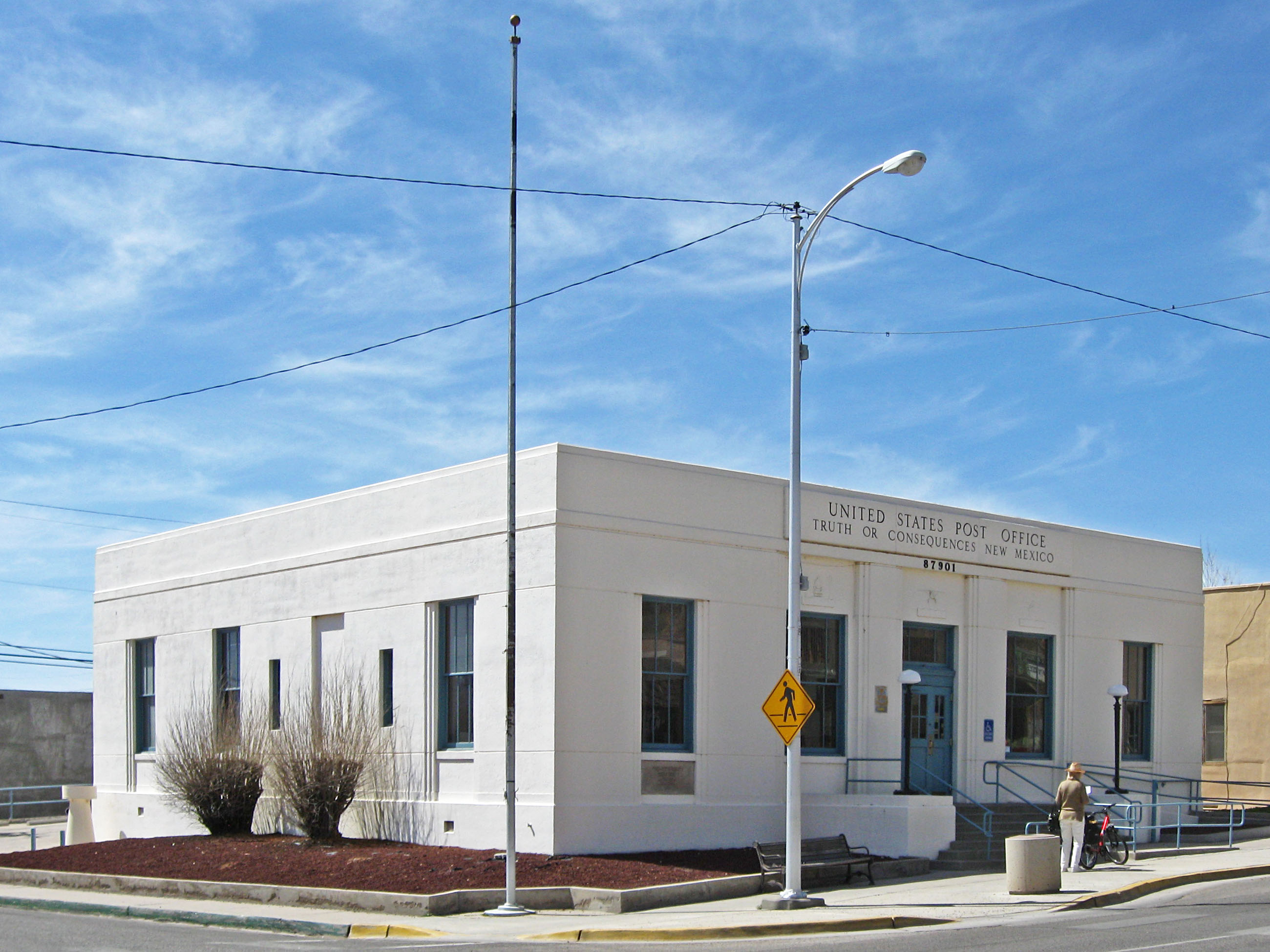

- Location within New Mexico Location within the United States
- Location: 400 Main St., Truth or Consequences, New Mexico
- Coordinates: 33°07′47″N 107°15′10″W
- Area: 0.3 acres (0.12 ha)
- Built: 1940
- Architect: Office of the Supervising Architect under Louis A. Simon
- Artist: Boris Deutsch
- Architectural style: Classical Revival
- MPS: US Post Offices in New Mexico MPS
- NRHP reference No.: 90000141
- Added to NRHP: February 23, 1990

The Hot Springs Post Office, or Truth or Consequences Main Post Office at 400 Main Street in Truth or Consequences, New Mexico was built in 1940. It was listed on the National Register of Historic Places in 1990.

It is Classical Revival in style, and was designed by the Office of the Supervising Architect under Louis A. Simon. It includes a 5 by 12 feet (1.5 m × 3.7 m) oil-on-canvas mural by artist Boris Deutsch, titled "The Indian Bear Dance," which was a prizewinner in a nearly-nation-wide competition run by the Fine Arts Section of the Federal Works Agency. It was one of 48 state-level selections out of 1,475 submitted sketches. The mural shows Indians in masks and costume performing a dance, with others watching, and was replicated in the December 4, 1939 issue of Life magazine.

== See also ==
- List of United States post office murals
