= Winnemucca Main Post Office =

- US Post Office--Winnemucca Main
- U.S. National Register of Historic Places
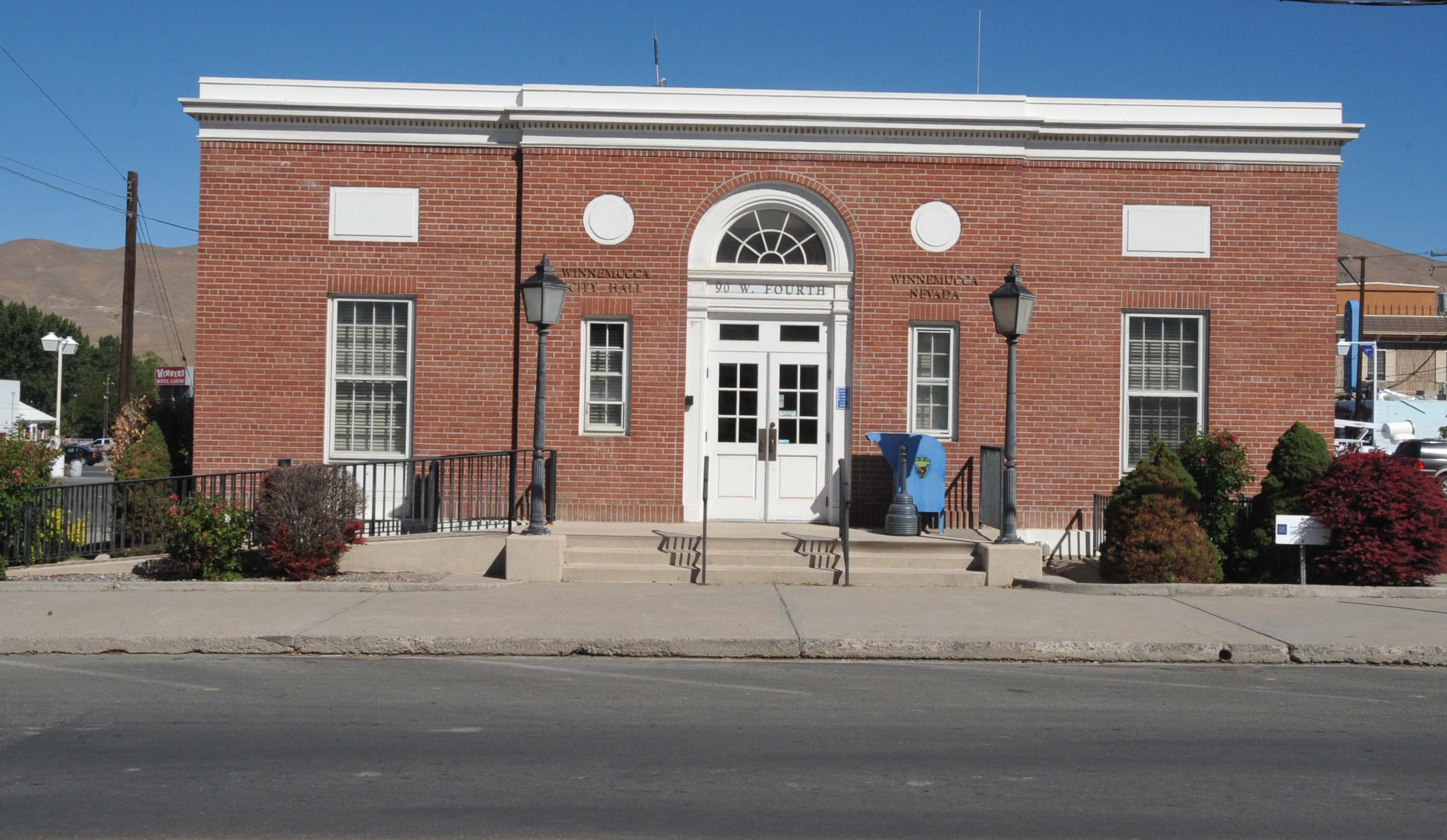
- The building in June 2013

- Location within Nevada Location within the United States
- Location: 90 W. 4th St., Winnemucca, Nevada
- Coordinates: 40°58′21″N 117°44′2″W
- Area: 0.4 acres (0.16 ha)
- Built: 1921
- Architect: Office of the Supervising Architect under James A. Wetmore; Gallagher, Frank
- Architectural style: Classical Revival
- MPS: US Post Offices in Nevada MPS
- NRHP reference No.: 90000137
- Added to NRHP: February 28, 1990

The Winnemucca Main Post Office, which is listed on the National Register of Historic Places as US Post Office—Winnemucca Main, is located at 4th and Melarkey Sts. in Winnemucca, Nevada and was built in 1921; it includes Classical Revival architecture and was listed on the National Register of Historic Places in 1990.

Although built from standardized plans, it was deemed significant as "a good example of a small town single-purpose post office", and it is in fact the oldest Federal building in Nevada (a Federal building in Reno was built earlier, but was replaced). The building was extended and remodeled in 1940, and then gained a mural, one of three New Deal arts program murals in post offices in the state.

The building is currently used as the Winnemucca City Hall.
