= LaVerne Nelson Black =

American painter

- Born: 1887; Viola, Wisconsin, U.S.
- Died: 1938 (aged 50–51); Chicago, Illinois, U.S.
- Occupation: Painter

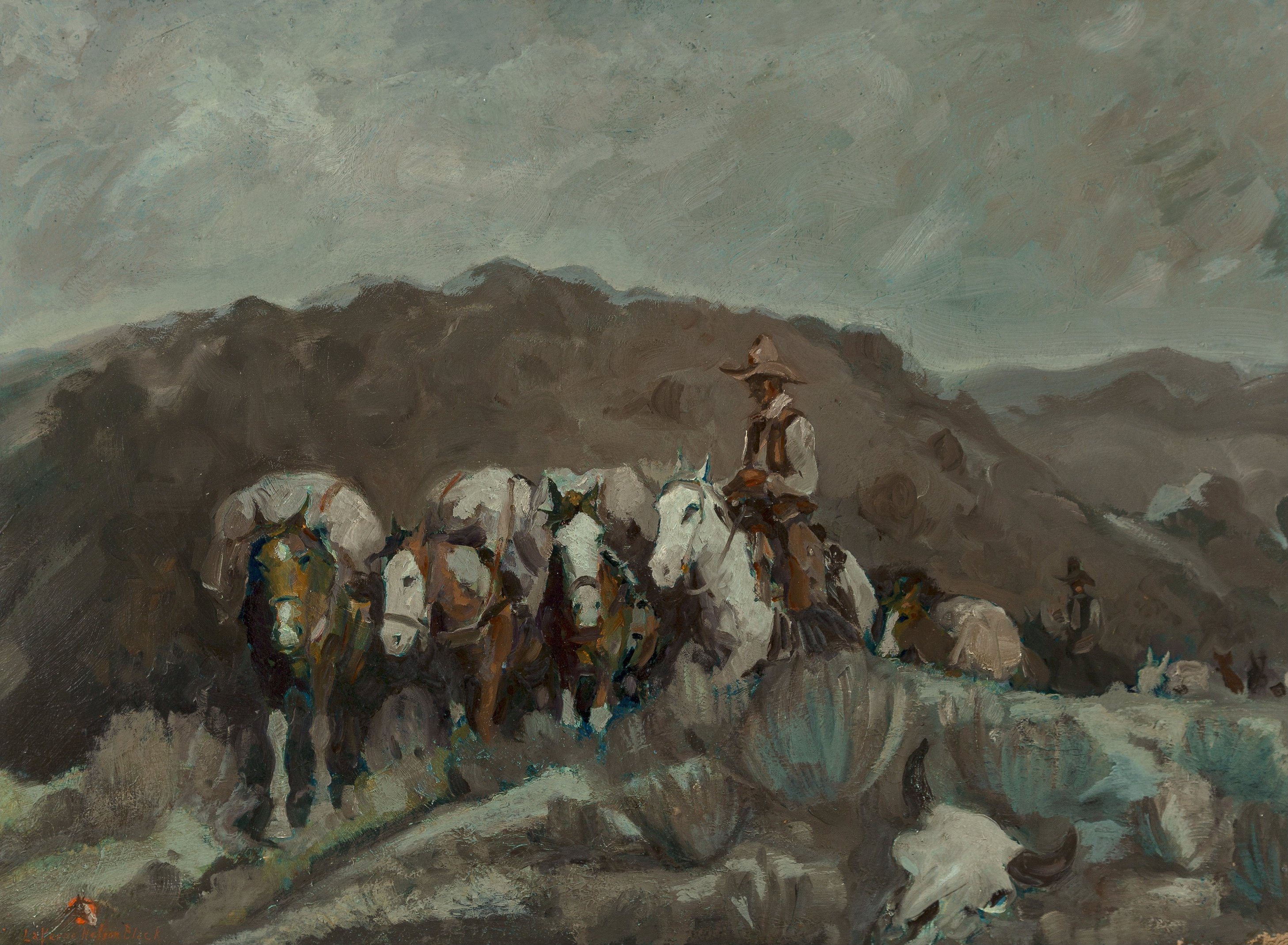
Pack Train at Night by LaVerne Nelson Black.

LaVerne Nelson Black (1887-1938) was an American painter whose work depicted Native Americans. Born in Wisconsin, he lived in Taos, New Mexico in the 1920s and Phoenix, Arizona in the 1930s, where he did two murals for the NRHP-listed United States Post Office. His work is in the permanent collections of the Denver Art Museum, the Fred Jones Jr. Museum of Art, and the Smithsonian American Art Museum.
