= United States Post Office-Lovelock Main =

- U.S. Post Office-Lovelock Main
- U.S. National Register of Historic Places
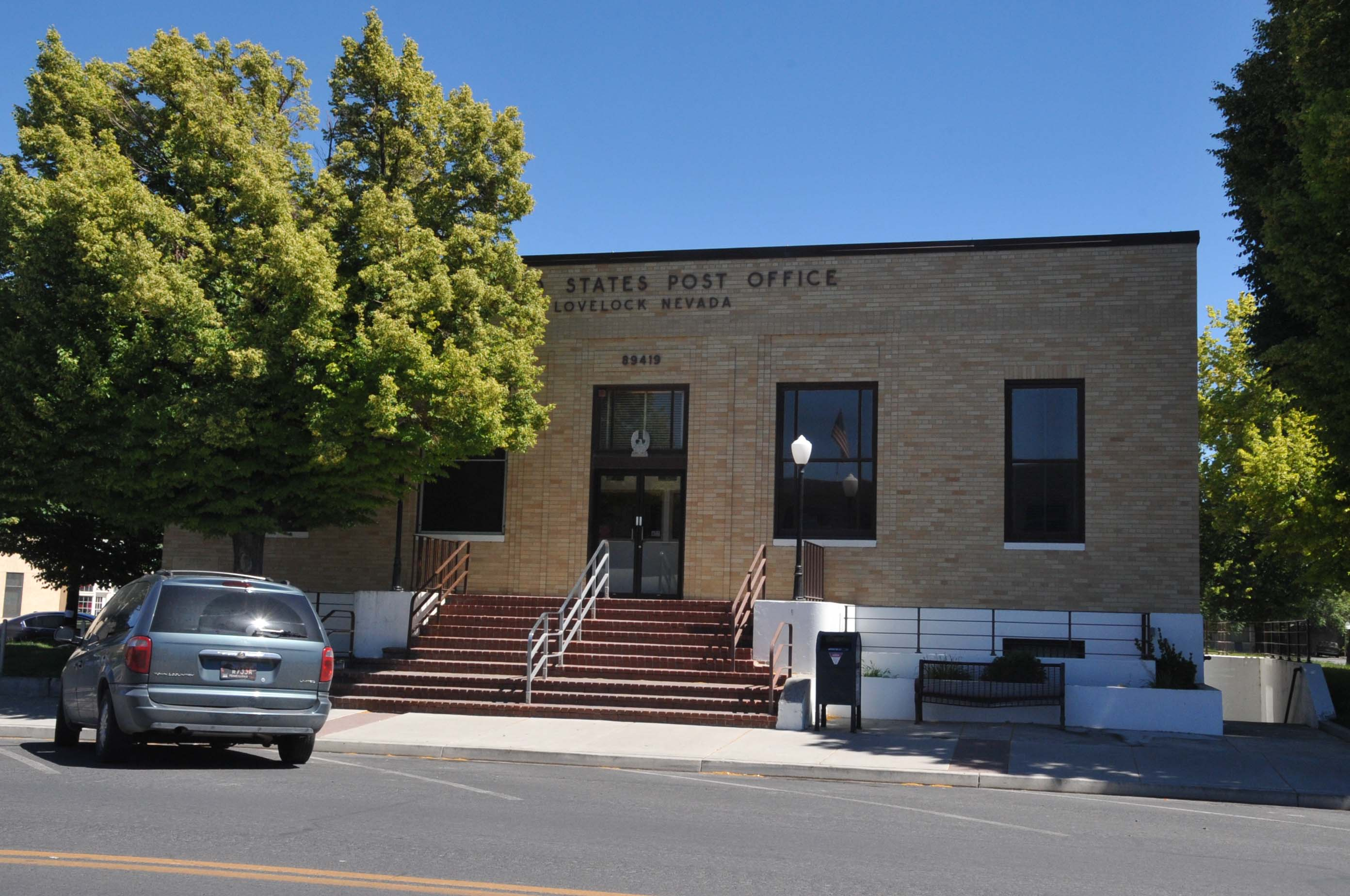

- Location within Nevada Location within the United States
- Location: 390 Main St., Lovelock, Nevada
- Coordinates: 40°10′51″N 118°28′28″W
- Area: 0.4 acres (0.16 ha)
- Built: 1938
- Built by: Lundberg-Richter, Inc.
- Architect: Simon, Louis A.
- Architectural style: Moderne, Starved Classical
- MPS: US Post Offices in Nevada MPS
- NRHP reference No.: 90000134
- Added to NRHP: February 28, 1990

The U.S. Post Office-Lovelock Main, at 390 Main St. in Lovelock, Nevada, was built in 1938. Also known as the Lovelock Main Post Office, it was listed on the National Register of Historic Places in 1990.

It was deemed significant, per its NRHP nomination, for its standardized Starved Classicism architecture and for symbolizing "not only the federal government's recognition of Lovelock's regional importance, but also the link between the local citizens and their elected representatives in Washington D.C." Also the building and a mural in its lobby, titled The Uncovering of the Comstock Lode and painted by Ejnar Hansen in 1940, "are also significant as legacies of the massive public works programs undertaken by the federal government to bolster the economy during the Depression."
