= Leo J. Beaulaurier =

American artist (1911–1984)

- Born: May 10, 1911; Great Falls, Montana
- Died: February 11, 1984 (aged 72); Cascade County, Montana

Leo James Beaulaurier (May 11, 1911–February 11, 1984) was a 20th-century American painter. He is best known for his United States post office murals painted for the New Deal art projects, and his portraits of Native American people done on velvet ground.

== Life and career ==
Beaulaurier was born in Great Falls, Montana, in 1911. He attended Great Falls High School and Notre Dame, and then won a scholarship to the Art Center of Los Angeles. He heard about the post-office art project while he was in Los Angeles and applied. He was commissioned in 1939 to do the murals for United States Post Office and Courthouse–Billings in Billings, Montana. He originally submitted for the Glasgow, Montana, mural, but was asked to do the federal building instead. He reported in 1983 that he had been paid $1,200 for the work, which took him about three weeks to complete. He was later commissioned to paint murals for the post office in Langdon, North Dakota.

Beaulaurier served as a captain in the U.S. Ferry Command during World War II. He helped install the Billings mural while home on military deferment for a broken leg.

Upon returning home from the war, he worked with his dad and brother at his father's contracting business, and got married. Around 1959 he went back to painting full-time. He painted Western subjects including Native Americans. He began painting on black velvet around 1962. There was an exhibit of his work at the Historical Society of Montana in 1963. He often exhibited at the Montana State Fair.

He lived in Montana almost his whole life and died in Cascade County in 1984. He and his wife had two kids together; she died in 1978.
