= Beaver Main Post Office =

Historic place in Utah, United States

- U.S. Post Office — Beaver Main
- U.S. National Register of Historic Places
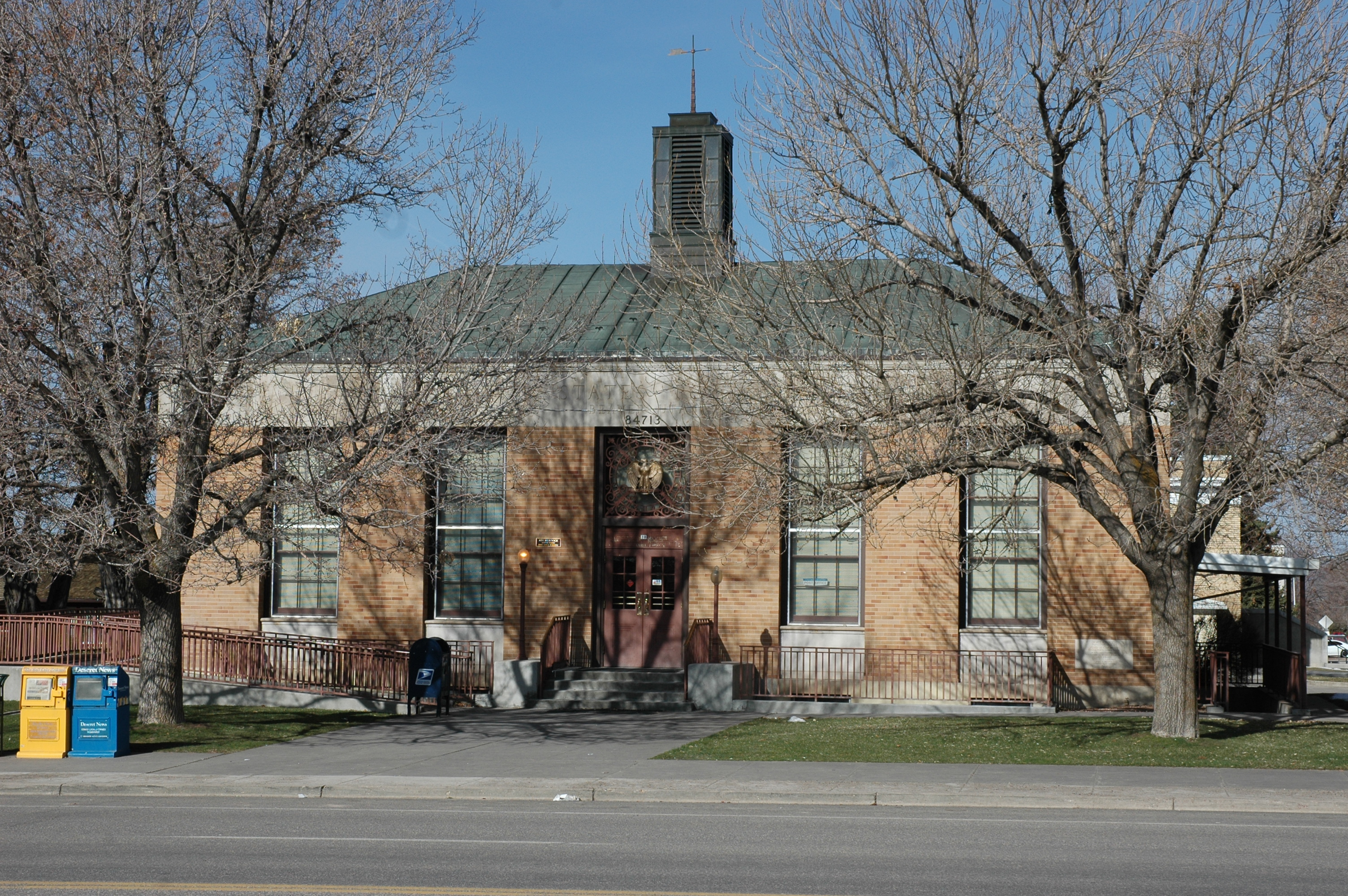

- Location within Utah Location within the United States
- Location: 20 S. Main St., Beaver, Utah
- Coordinates: 38°16′26″N 112°38′27″W
- Area: 0.4 acres (0.16 ha)
- Built: 1941
- Architect: Louis A. Simon
- Architectural style: Moderne, Colonial Revival
- MPS: US Post Offices in Utah MPS
- NRHP reference No.: 89001992
- Added to NRHP: November 27, 1989

The Beaver Main Post Office, in Beaver, Utah, was built in 1941. It reflects Moderne architecture and Colonial Revival architecture. It was listed on the National Register of Historic Places in 1989 as U.S. Post Office — Beaver Main.

It is a buff-colored brick building with a copper-clad hipped roof.
