= Deming Main Post Office =

- US Post Office--Deming Main
- U.S. National Register of Historic Places
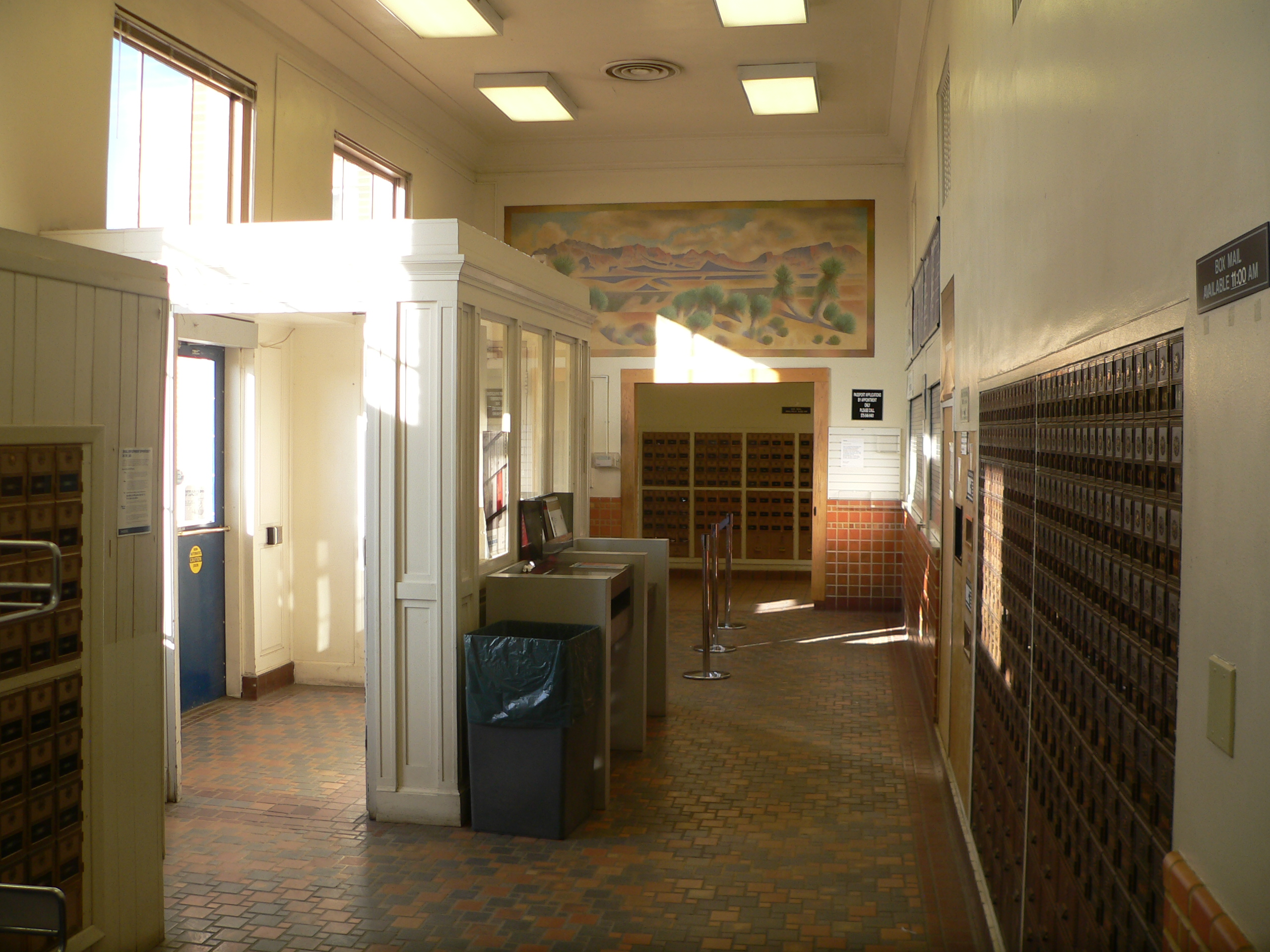

- Location within New Mexico
- Location: 201 W. Spruce St., Deming, New Mexico
- Coordinates: 32°16′03″N 107°45′37″W
- Area: 0.5 acres (0.20 ha)
- Built: 1937
- Architect: Louis A. Simon
- Architectural style: Classical Revival
- MPS: US Post Offices in New Mexico MPS
- NRHP reference No.: 90000139
- Added to NRHP: February 23, 1990

The Deming Main Post Office, at 201 W. Spruce St. in Deming, New Mexico, was built in 1937. It was listed on the National Register of Historic Places in 1990 as U.S. Post Office—Deming Main.

Its Classical Revival design is attributed to Louis A. Simon.

The interior includes a mural painted by artist Kenneth Adams in 1938, funded by a New Deal public arts program. The 5.5 by 12 feet (1.7 m × 3.7 m) mural shows a landscape typical of the Deming area.

The property is listed for its information potential as well as for its architecture.

== See also ==
- List of post office murals
