= Ernest Hamlin Baker =

American illustrator

- Born: May 5, 1889; Poughkeepsie, New York, U.S.
- Died: November 17, 1975 (aged 86); Norton, Massachusetts, U.S.
- Education: Colgate University
- Style: Cartoonist

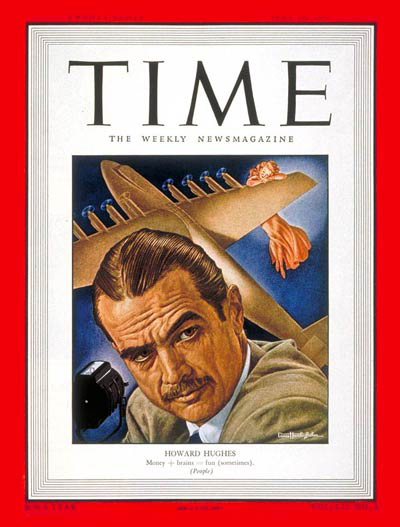
Baker's illustration of Howard Hughes on the cover of Time magazine, July 1948

Ernest Hamlin Baker (May 5, 1889 – November 17, 1975) was an American artist and illustrator from Poughkeepsie, New York. He illustrated more than 300 covers for Time magazine as well as several covers for Fortune magazine. Baker also created posters for the American Legion and in 1939 he was hired by the Works Progress Administration to paint the mural titled “Economic Activities in the Days of the Narragansett Planters” at the Wakefield, Rhode Island post office. He drew political cartoons for Poughkeepsie's Evening Star newspaper. His work was part of the painting event in the art competition at the 1932 Summer Olympics.

He graduated from Colgate University in 1914.
