= Lucia Wiley =

American painter (1906–1998)

- Born: April 14, 1906; Tillamook, Oregon
- Died: August 20, 1998 (aged 92); New York City
- Known for: muralist

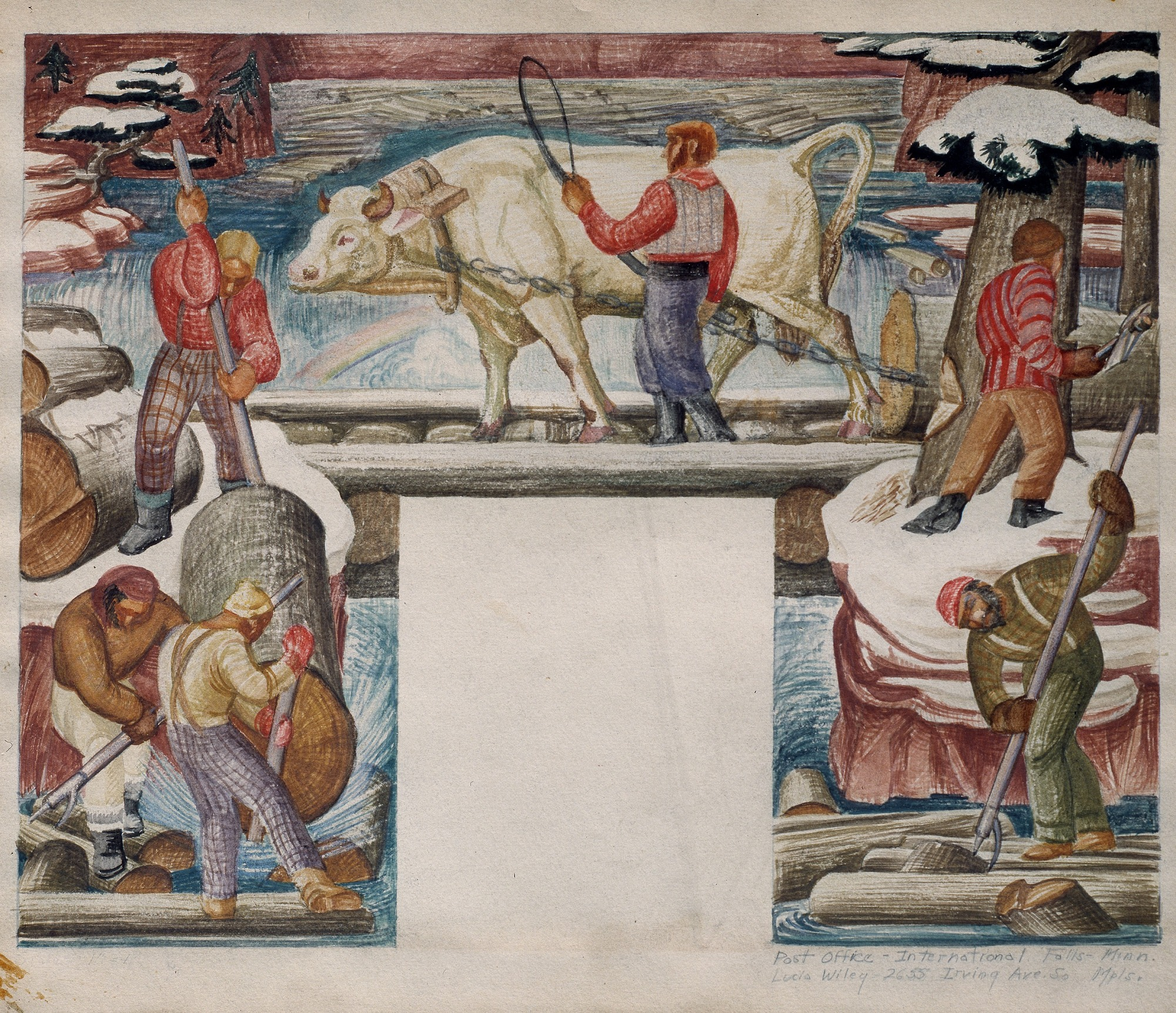
Study for Early Logging at Koochiching Falls (1937), Wiley's mural for the post office in International Falls, Minnesota

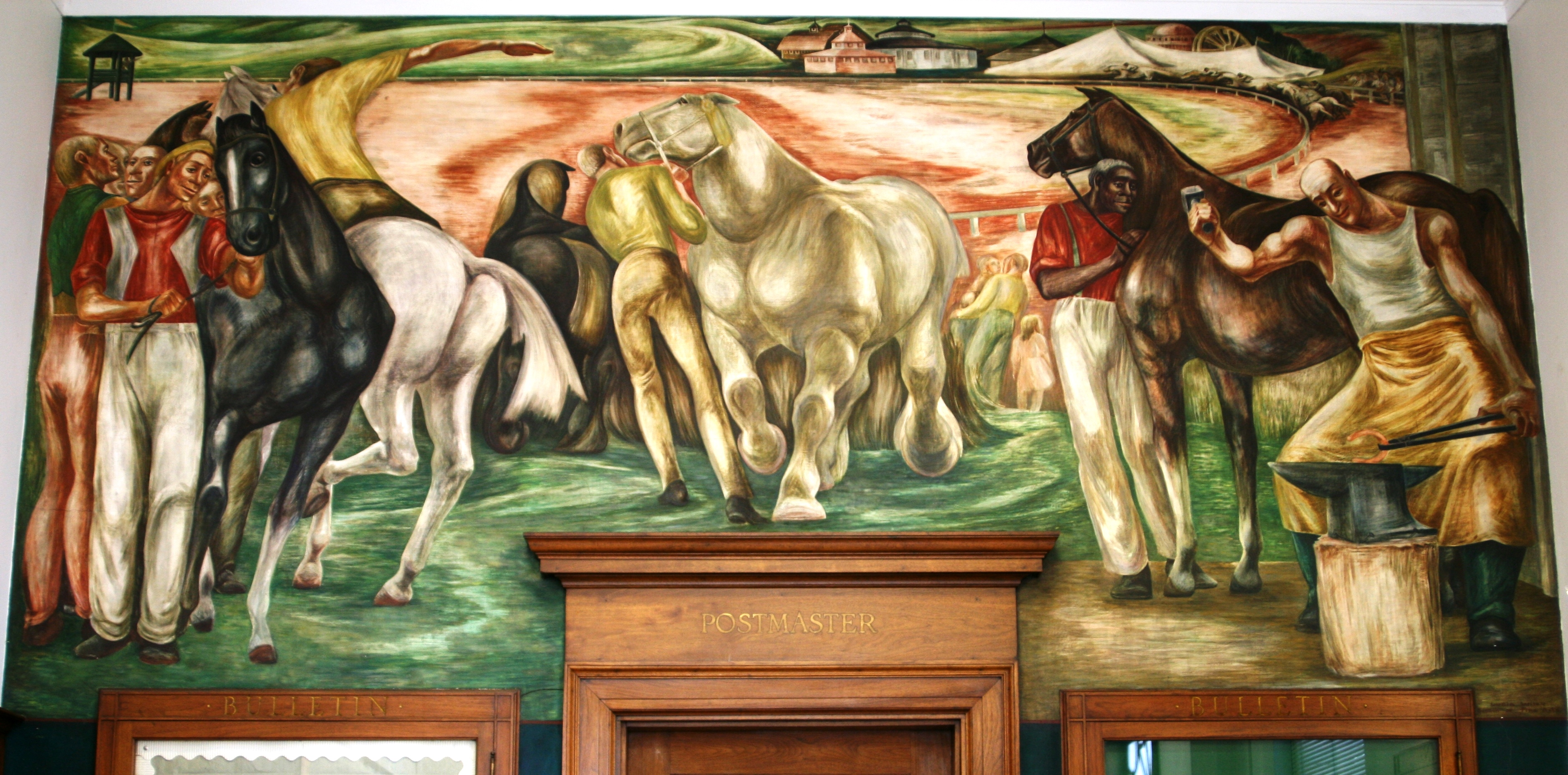
Shelby County Fair – 1900 (1941), egg tempera fresco mural for the post office in Shelbyville, Illinois

Lucia Wiley (April 14, 1906 – August 20, 1998) was a noted New Deal muralist and painter born and raised in Tillamook, Oregon. Lucia Wiley was the oldest of six children and always found herself interested in art, even at a young age. In 1923 Wiley stated, "He who has an art has every where a part," in her high school yearbook. In 1924 Wiley started college at the University of Minnesota where she pursued a degree in fine arts. In 1928 she transferred to the University of Oregon to further her studies and in 1930, she received a Bachelor of Arts degree majoring in fine arts. Lucia went on to further her schooling and graduated with a Masters in Fine Arts from the University of Oregon.

Her work appears in several U.S. post offices, including a mural titled Captain Gray Entering Tillamook Bay in Tillamook, and at the University of Oregon at Eugene. In 1939 Wiley painted a post office mural titled Early Logging at Koochichin Falls for the United States post office in International Falls, Minnesota. She painted the mural decoration, Occupations, at the Miller Vocational High School in Minneapolis, Minnesota. In the mid-1950s Wiley became a postulate at the Episcopalian Community of the Holy Spirit at St. Hilda's House in New York City, becoming Sister Lucia Wiley.

She died on August 20, 1998, in New York City.

== Early life ==
Born in Tillamook on April 14, 1906, to parents Wayne and Frances Drew Wiley, Lucia was the oldest of six children. She attended the University of Minnesota for Art Education in 1924 to 1926 before transferring to the University of Oregon to complete a bachelor's degree in fine arts and a master's degree, which she received in 1932. Her thesis was a study of true fresco, a centuries-old technique in which color pigments are added directly to wet plaster. As part of her degree, she also created the fresco Fishing on the Columbia River (also known as Salmon Fishing in Oregon) in the foyer of the Exhibition Hall at the University of Oregon's School of Architecture and Allied Arts.

Following some post-graduate study at the Minneapolis School of Art at the Minneapolis Museum of Art, Wiley accepted a full time teaching position at the school in June 1933. But the Depression caused the school to cancel her contract before school started, and for the next three years she gave fresco workshops for the Minneapolis School of Art. She also worked as a Federal Art Project fresco artist from 1938 to 1940, mostly in Minnesota and Illinois.

== Career ==
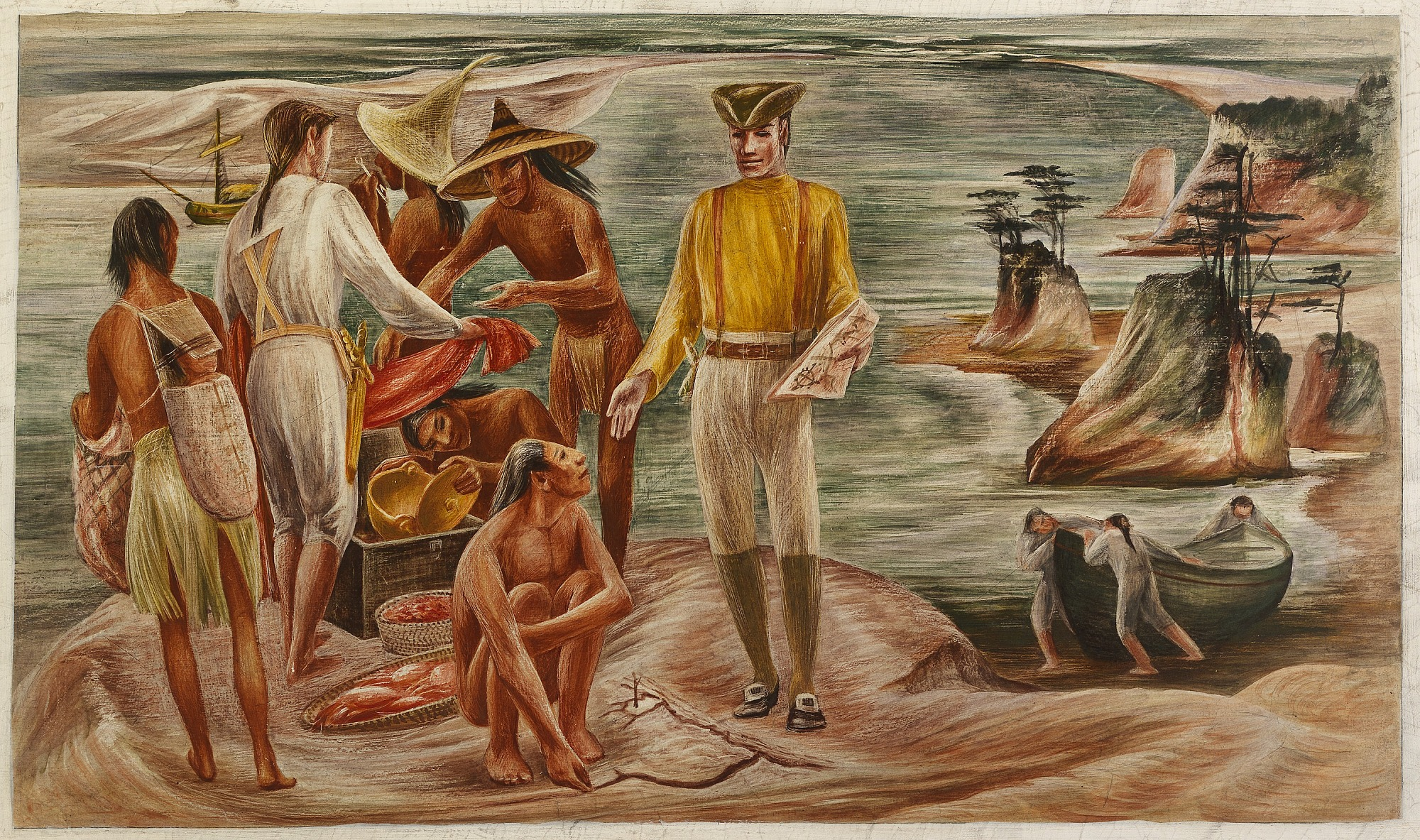
Study for Captain Gray Entering Tillamook Bay (1943), Wiley's mural for the post office in Tillamook, Oregon

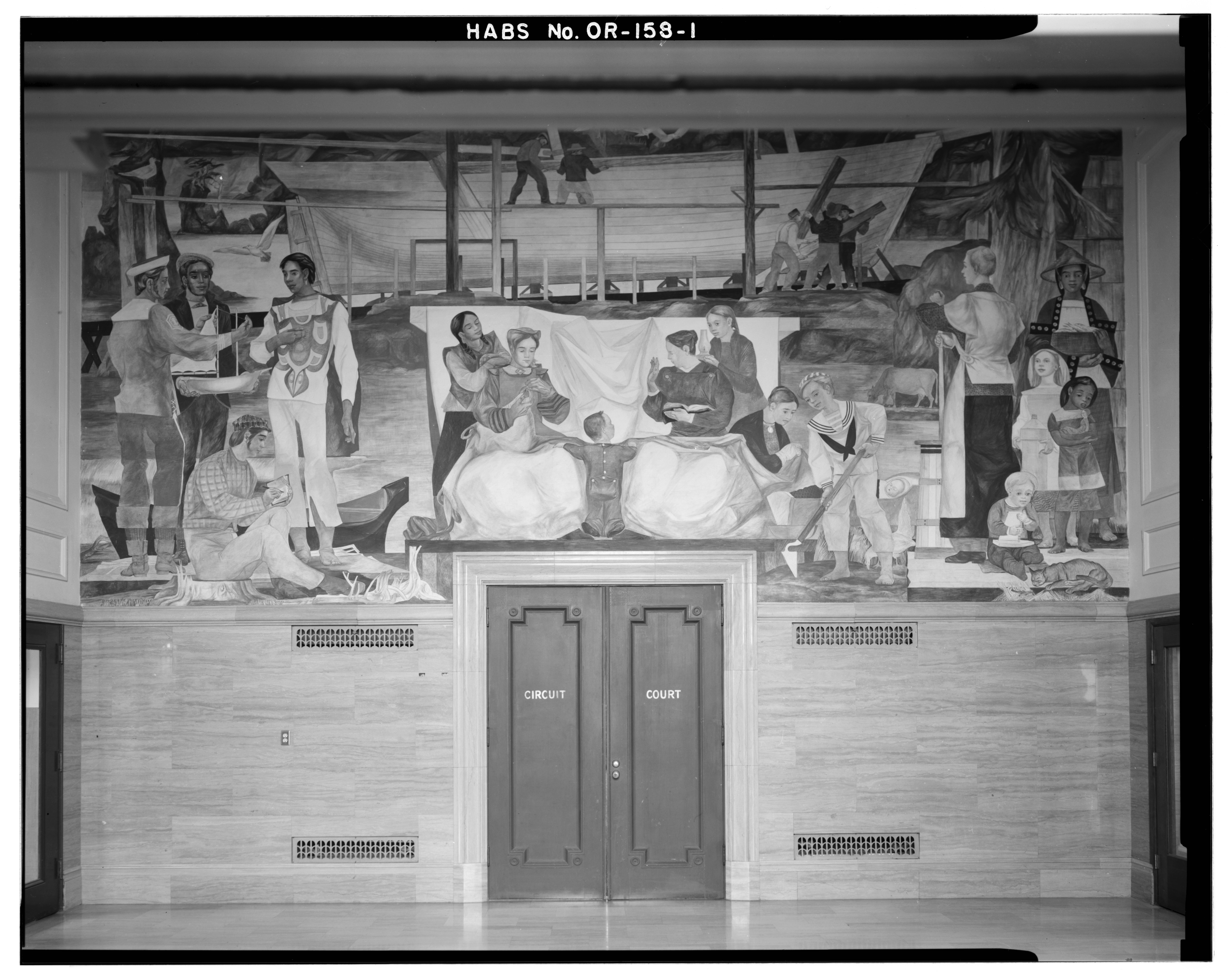
Building of the Morning Star (1950) at the Tillamook County Courthouse

In the early 1940s, the U.S. Treasury Department held a competition for fresco artists to create murals in post offices around the country. Wiley won a commission, and a group of citizens requested that her fresco be installed in the new post office being built in Tillamook. The Treasury Department agreed, and she began the tedious work of preparing the walls and installing the mural, completing it in 1943.

Wiley held art classes in her Tillamook studio until 1946, when she took a position at the Museum Art School at the Portland Art Museum (now the Pacific Northwest College of Art). During this time, she created the fresco Woman at the Well in the St. John's Episcopal Church in Milwaukie.

It was the Tillamook post office mural that led to Wiley's commission to create the Tillamook County Courthouse mural in the late 1940s. No public funds were used to create Building of the Morning Star in the courthouse entry. County commissioners and judges solicited funds from private individuals and logging companies to sponsor the fresco. The mural tells the story of the first commercial ship built in Tillamook, which supplied early white settlers with a means of selling their cheese and bringing supplies to the community. The courthouse fresco, painted in 33 sections, was a finalist in the Architectural League of New York's Gold Medal Award in 1951.

By the early 1950s, Wiley was considered one of the nation's most significant fresco artists. But in 1955, she resigned from the Portland Art Museum to become a postulate at the Episcopalian Community of the Holy Spirit at St. Hilda's House in New York City. In an interview in 1996, she explained: “I think that painting fresco and the discipline of it, and the studies of these things...I began to want more quiet and more meditation and also, although I had this wonderful job at the museum, it was just a fine job. I had time to do my own painting all on the side....And good people, and good everything about it. And I had the Episcopal Church there, and I had a lovely home I had bought, but this wasn't enough...there was something more that I was hungry for, and it just grew about gradually.”

Sister Lucia soon became the supervising art teacher at St. Hilda's, where she also taught math, English, social studies, and religion in the Community's two schools. In 1957, she illustrated Our Prayers and Praises in the Book of Common Prayer. She became Sister Warden of Associates, serving as an adviser to postulates, novitiates, and ordinates of the Community of the Holy Spirit. In this capacity, Sister Lucia presented training and spiritual direction in the United States, Canada, and Panama.

== Death ==
She died in Harlem in New York City on August 20, 1998.

== Exhibitions ==
Lucia Wiley: Portraits of America, Tillamook County Pioneer Museum, 2021

Artists for Victory, Metropolitan Museum in New York, 1943

== Collections ==
A number of Wiley's works are held by the Weisman Art Museum in Minneapolis, Minnesota. The Tillamook County Pioneer Museum also holds some of Wiley's works and held and exhibit of Wiley's portraits in the Tillamook City Hall from 2021 to 2022.
