= Seymour Fogel =

American artist (1911–1984)

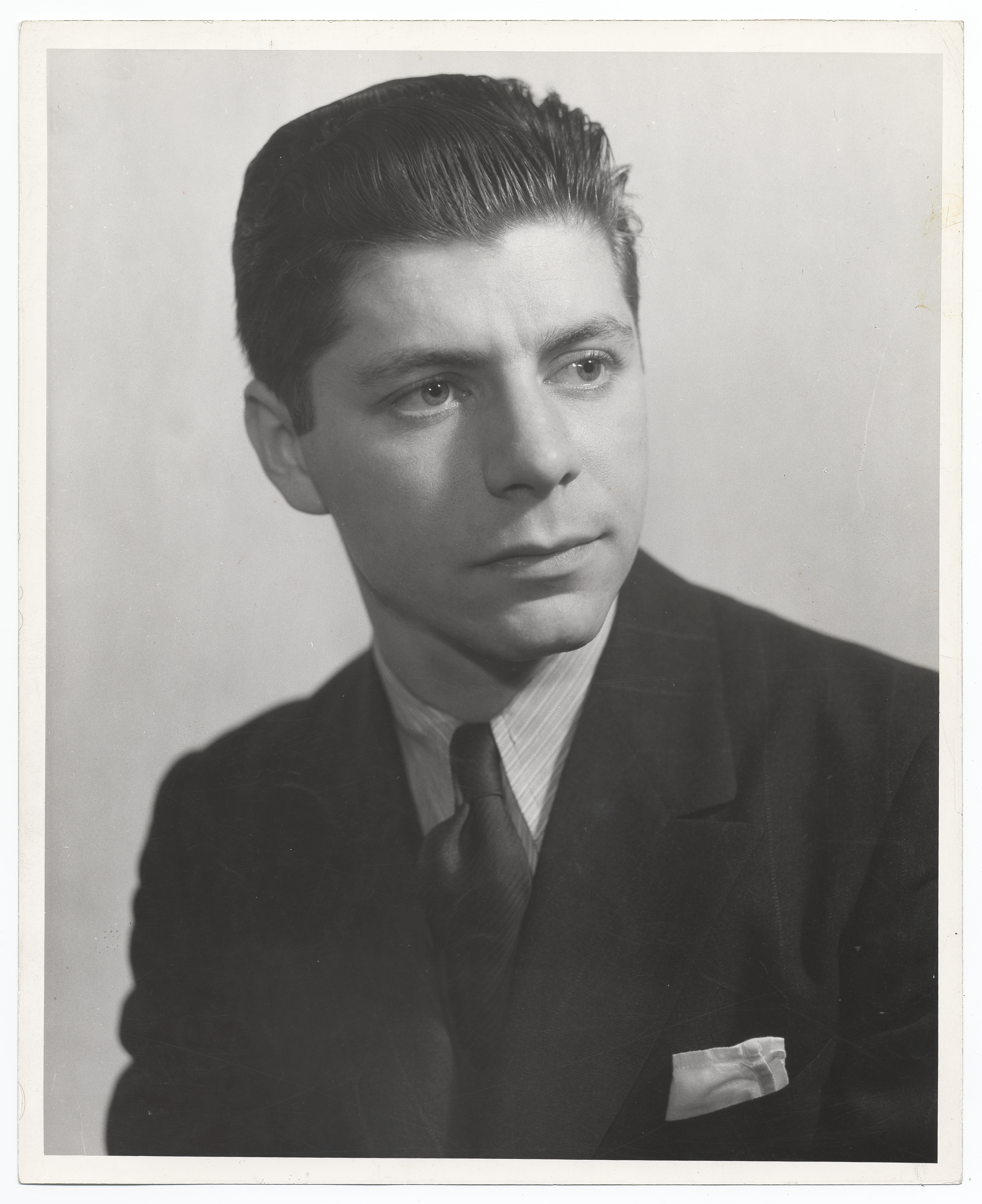
- Seymour Fogel in 1937
- Born: August 24, 1911
- Died: December 4, 1984 (age 73)
- Education: Art Students League of New York (1929); National Academy of Design (1929 - 1932)
- Movement: Social realism

Seymour Fogel (August 24, 1911 – December 4, 1984) was an American artist whose artistic output included social realist art early in the century, abstract art and expressionist art at mid-century, and transcendental art late in the century. His drive to experiment led him to work with expected media – oil paints, watercolors, and acrylics – as well as unconventional media such as glass, plastics, sand, and wax.

== Education ==
Seymour Fogel was born in New York City on August 24, 1911. He studied at the Art Students League in 1929 and at the National Academy of Design from 1929 to 1932 under such established artists as Leon Kroll and George Brandt Bridgman.

However, by the time he graduated in 1932, he felt constrained by academic traditions and yearned for creative freedom. Fogel was dissatisfied with the schooling he received at the National Academy, noting in his memoirs: "when I left my school, I could copy most anything, draw the human figure and paint it, and nothing else. I didn't know what a painting really was, how to create anything, and my impressionable mind was firmly molded in academic papier-mâché."

== Career ==
In 1932, upon graduation from the National Academy, Seymour Fogel served as an apprentice to the Mexican muralist Diego Rivera, then working on his controversial mural at Rockefeller Center in New York City. Fogel and Rivera became close friends, with the latter exercising a formative influence on the former. Rivera introduced Fogel to the techniques of large-scale mural painting.

By the mid-1930s Fogel was an established member of the New York City art community, and was familiar with artists like Yasuo Kuniyoshi, Alexander Brook, Georg Theo Hartman, Arnold Blanch, Adolf Dehn, Phillip Guston, Ben Shahn, and Rico Lebrun. Ed Walker, the chairman of Millikin University's art department, noted that Fogel's "story reads like a 'who's who' in midcentury American art."

From 1934 to 1941 Fogel was awarded several mural commissions by both the Federal Art Project of the Works Progress Administration ("WPA") and the Treasury Department's Section of Painting and Sculpture, executing murals in such places as Brooklyn, New York; Safford, Arizona; Cambridge, Minnesota; Washington, D.C., and at the 1939 New York World's Fair. While traveling across the United States in freight trains to complete mural commissions for the Federal government, Fogel produced drawings of ordinary Americans who had been affected by the Great Depression. These social realist works depicted grinding urban poverty, and lynchings in the American South.

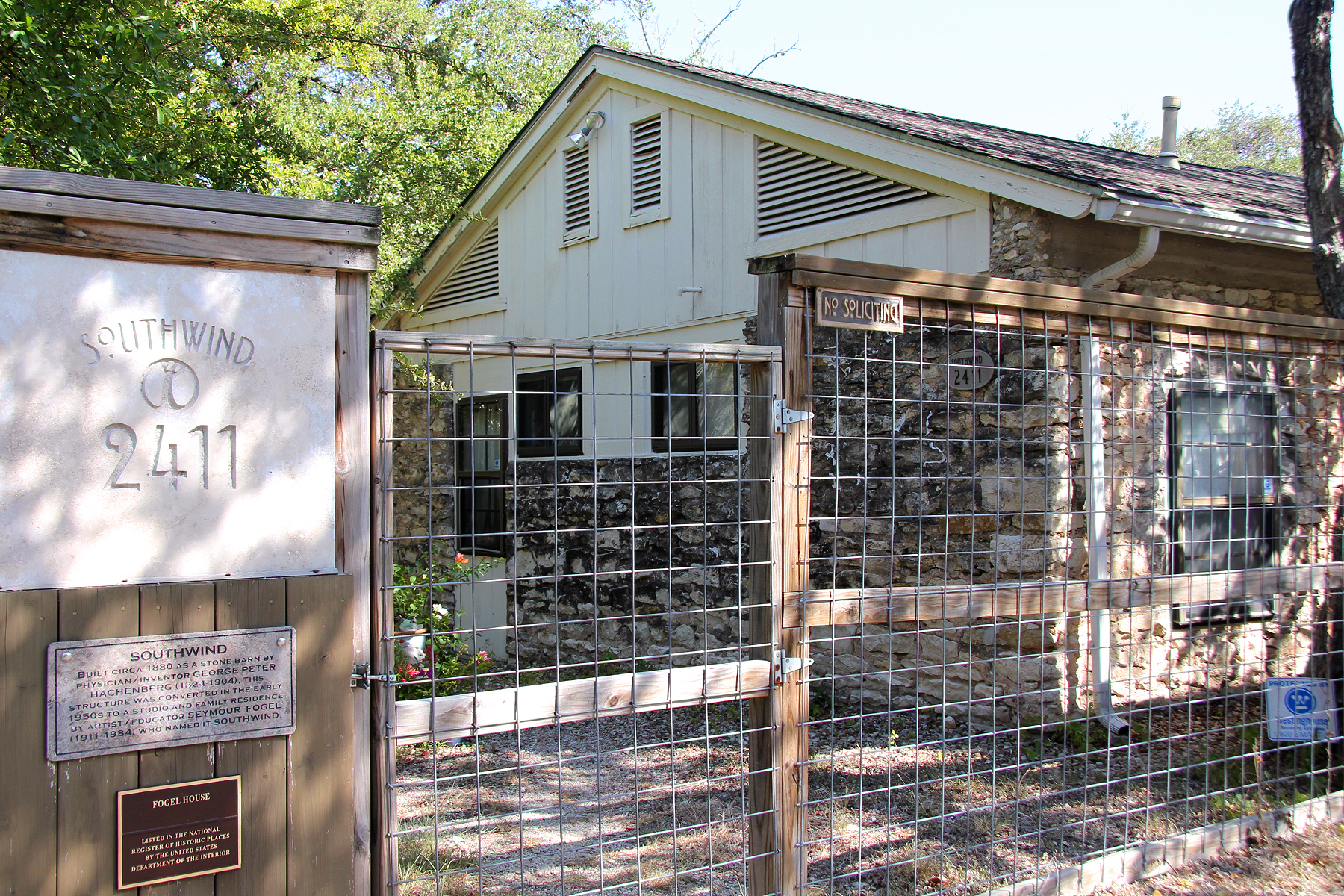
Fogel's home "Southwind" in Austin, Texas

In 1946, Fogel moved to Austin, Texas, where he accepted a teaching position at the University of Texas at Austin. He became an integral part of the Texas Modernism movement, along with such artists as Kelly Fearing, Lester and Charles Umlauf. In Texas he executed what have been considered the first abstract murals in the state for the American National Bank (1954), which was recognized by Time magazine as one of the year's most significant achievements in corporate art, the Baptist Student Center at the University of Texas (1949), the First National Bank in Waco (1955), the First Christian Church in Houston (1956) and the Petroleum Club, also in Houston (1950). He pioneered the use of ethyl silicate in his mural commissions.

Fogel converted a rustic 19th-century barn in South Austin into a ranch-style house with Usonian influences in 1953. The Seymour and Barbara Fogel House, which Fogel called "Southwind", was listed on the National Register of Historic Places on April 2, 2003, both for its association with Fogel and its unique architecture and construction.

In 1959, Seymour Fogel moved back to New York City, where he maintained a studio and established his residence first in Westport and then in Weston, Connecticut. During this time he began to experiment with texturing his paintings with such material as paraffin wax, cloth, wood and sand. In New York he produced transcendentalist art which he referred to as "atavistic." Fogel's New York exploratory years were among his most experimental, challenging artistic norms and redefining the relationship between viewer, space, and medium. Mural commissions at this time include the U.S. Federal Building in Fort Worth, Texas (1966), the Hoffman La Roche Corporate Towers in Nutley, New Jersey (1964), Public School 306 in Brooklyn, New York (1967) and the U.S. Federal Customs Building in Foley Square, New York City in 1968. In the latter stage of his mural career, he used mosaic as his primary medium.

In 1974, Seymour Fogel relocated his studio from New York City to his residence in Weston. In this last decade of his life, Fogel focused entirely on atavistic art in a variety of forms: paintings, drawings, collages and both painted and raw wood constructions. Seymour Fogel died on December 4, 1984. His estate is managed by his granddaughter.

== Exhibitions ==
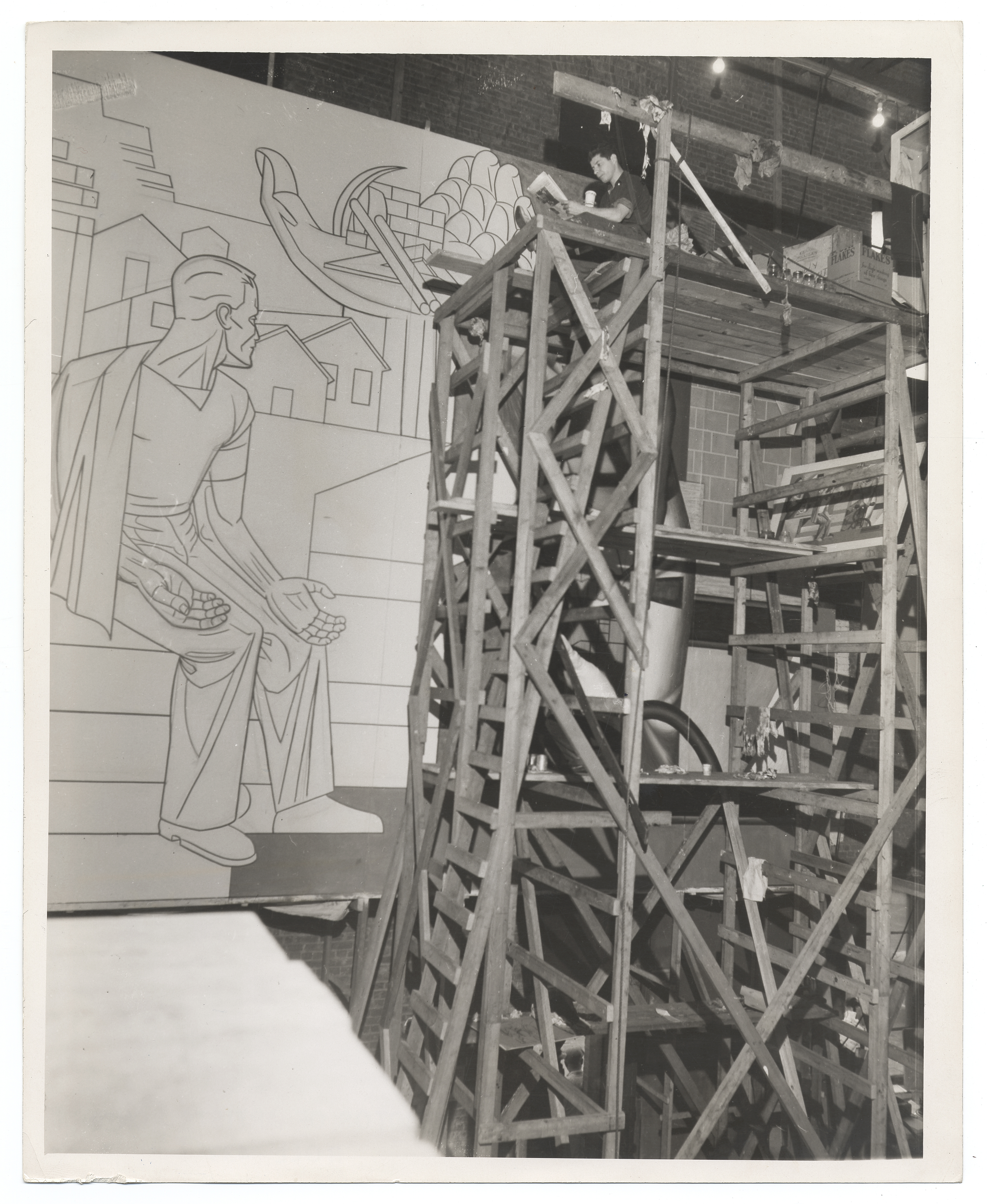
Fogel in 1939, reading a newspaper on his scaffolding while painting a mural

Fogel's art was exhibited in numerous museums and galleries, including the Whitney Museum of American Art, the Corcoran Gallery of Art, the Telfair Museum of Art, the Greenville County Museum of Art and the Dallas Museum of Art. His work can now be found in numerous museum collections, including the Hirshhorn Museum and Sculpture Garden, Washington, DC; National Archives of American Art, Washington DC; the Museum of Fine Arts Houston; Dallas Museum of Art; Whitney Museum of American Art, NY; Amon Carter Museum of Art; Telfair Museum of Art, Savannah, Georgia; Museum of Art and Archaeology, University of Missouri, Columbia, MO; Greenville County Museum of Art, Greenville, SC; Kresge Art Museum, East Lansing, MI; and the Metropolitan Museum of Art, NY.

Fogel generated a prolific and distinctive body of work. John Baur, director emeritus of the Whitney Museum of American Art, noted Seymour Fogel's art was shown at the Whitney museum many times. Of Fogel, Baur said: "I have learned the only thing one can safely expect in Fogel's work is the unexpected. Men like Sy have worked in all media, explored all styles, and refused to limit themselves."

Greta Berman, an art historian and educator at Juilliard College wrote: "Fogel's endless exploration into self and the eternal world reaches beyond easy definition … revealing a multitude of dimension and meaning that forms the very essence of art."

== Gallery ==
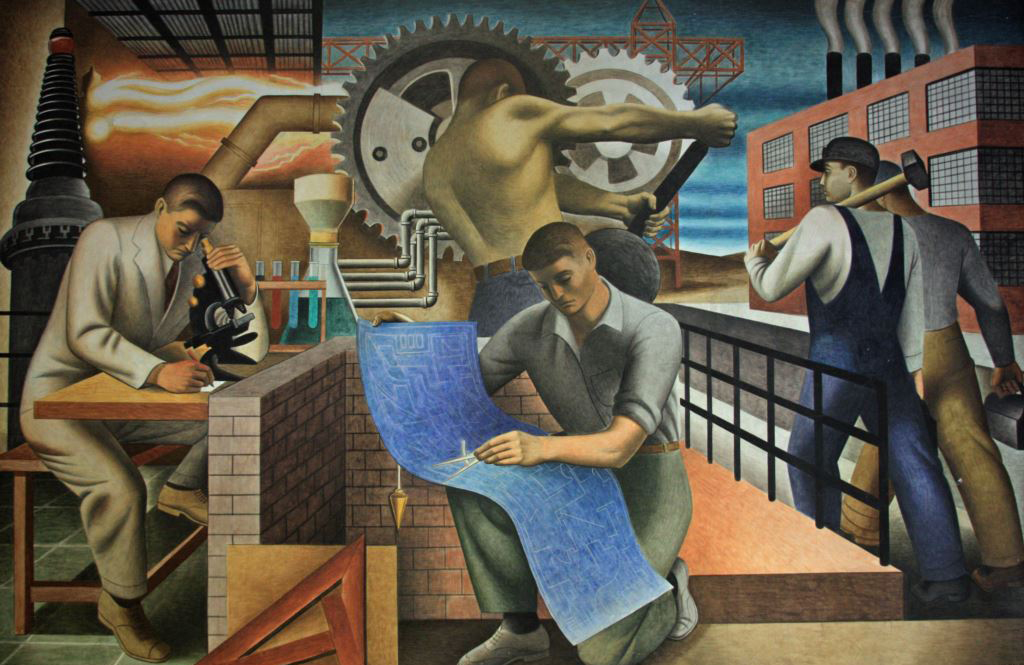
"The Wealth of the Nation," 1938 mural, titled after Scottish economist Adam Smith's 1776 treatise The Wealth of Nations

1940 mural "The Security of the People," located in the Wilbur J. Cohen Federal Building
