= Elizabeth Lochrie =

American painter

- Born: Elizabeth Tangye Davey; July 1, 1890; Deer Lodge, Montana
- Died: May 17, 1981 (aged 90); Ojai, California
- Known for: Painter, Muralist
- Spouse: Arthur Lochrie (m. 1913–1975)

Elizabeth Davey Lochrie (July 1, 1890 – May 17, 1981) was an American painter, sculptor, and muralist born in Deer Lodge, Montana. She is best remembered for her portraits and portrayal of Native Americans and their lifestyle in the Montana and Idaho area.

== Personal life ==
Lochrie studied at the Pratt Institute in New York City with Winold Reiss and Victor Arnautoff and at Stanford University in California.

Lochrie was an artist with the Federal Art Project and painted post office murals for the Treasury Section of Fine Arts in Burley and St. Anthony in Idaho. For the post office at Dillon in Montana she painted a mural News from the States.

In 1932, the Blackfeet Nation adopted her, giving her the name, "Netchitaki" which means "Woman Alone in Her Way."
