= Elof Wedin =

Swedish-American painter

- Wedin in 1958
- Born: June 28, 1901; Härnösand, Sweden
- Died: February 1, 1983 (aged 81)
- Education: Minneapolis Institute of Arts; School of the Art Institute of Chicago
- Movement: Impressionism; Geometric abstraction

Elof Wedin (June 28, 1901 – February 1, 1983) was a Swedish American artist who enjoyed a 50-year career in Minneapolis and Saint Paul, Minnesota. His main choice of medium was oil on canvas, but he also worked with pastels on velour, carved wood, and stainless steel.

== Background ==
Elof Wedin was born in Härnösand, Ångermanland, Sweden. His father was a shopkeeper. Elof learned his trade of insulating and lining boilers while living in Sweden. He immigrated to the United States in 1919, taking up residence in Minneapolis, MN. Elof Wedin entered night school at the Minneapolis Institute of Arts in the early 1920s. In 1926, he went to study under George Oberteuffer (1878–1940) at the School of the Art Institute of Chicago. Two years later, he returned to Minneapolis. In 1928, Wedin began his career as a boilermaker, insulating boilers and ductwork with asbestos. While Wedin worked a day job in thermal power stations, he painted on evenings and weekends.

== Art ==
Wedin's works from the 1920s to the mid-1930s were representational. His major influences during this period were Rembrandt, Amedeo Modigliani, and Impressionism. During the 1930s, his portraits featured oval faces and elongated features, inspired by the works of Amedeo Modigliani.

Wedin also painted Landscape art, an interest that was the subject of his entry in the 1934 Minnesota State Fair. During the depression, Wedin painted for several New Deal art projects, producing a series of Minneapolis street scenes under the Public Works of Art Project, as well as works for the post offices of Litchfield, Minnesota titled Street Scene, completed in 1937, and Mobridge, South Dakota titled Return from the Fields in 1938. He was also a Works Progress Administration artist, focusing on Regionalism, depicting scenes from small towns and from the North Shore (Lake Superior) of Minnesota, where he spent significant time. Unlike many regionalists, his style was a highly Geometric abstraction.

Works from Wedin's middle period, 1935 to 1957, were characterized for their experimentation with textures, free form and pastel colors. They are distinctly influenced by Modernism, but not yet completely abstract. His landscapes of the 1930s and 1940s had flattened space with no perspective, minimal sky, and buildings represented as angular shapes. Major influences during this time included Paul Cézanne, Pablo Picasso, Georges Braque, and the avant-garde Cubism art movement.

In his later phase, 1958 through the mid-1970s, Wedin ventured into Abstract art, using raw colors applied with a palette-knife technique. By the 1960s he had begun to paint large non-objective canvases in thickly applied diagonals of bold color and black. Brilliantly colored areas that appeared to be broken up at close range would fit together at a distance, producing what Wedin called a "hidden abstract" composition. Wedin's works are represented in many major private and institutional collections, including the Walker Art Center in Minneapolis, the American Swedish Institute in Minneapolis, the Mayo Clinic in Rochester, MN and the Smithsonian Institution in Washington, D.C. In 1996 Wedin was one of 33 artists whose work was featured in the exhibition "Pictures for a New Home: Minnesota’s Swedish-American Artists," at the James J. Hill House Gallery in St. Paul, sponsored by the Minnesota Historical Society. In 2008, Elof Wedin was one of the artists featured in the Weisman Art Museum's "By the People, for the People" exhibit of Works Progress Administration paintings.

Wedin earned awards from the Minneapolis Institute of Arts annual shows, Minnesota State Fair exhibitions, the Art Institute of Chicago, the Swedish-American Clubs of Minneapolis and Chicago, the Woman's Club of Minneapolis, the First New York American Artist Exhibition, the San Francisco Exhibition and the Los Angeles County Exhibition.

== Personal life ==
Elof Wedin wed Lilian Westman in October 1926. Their first son, Winslow, was born in 1933, and their second son, Gary, was born in 1942. Elof Wedin died in 1983 from complications due to prolonged Asbestos exposure.

== Gallery ==
Untitled (nude)

Tugboat (Chicago), C.1922

Pioneer Mother, 1927

Portrait of a Man, 1930s

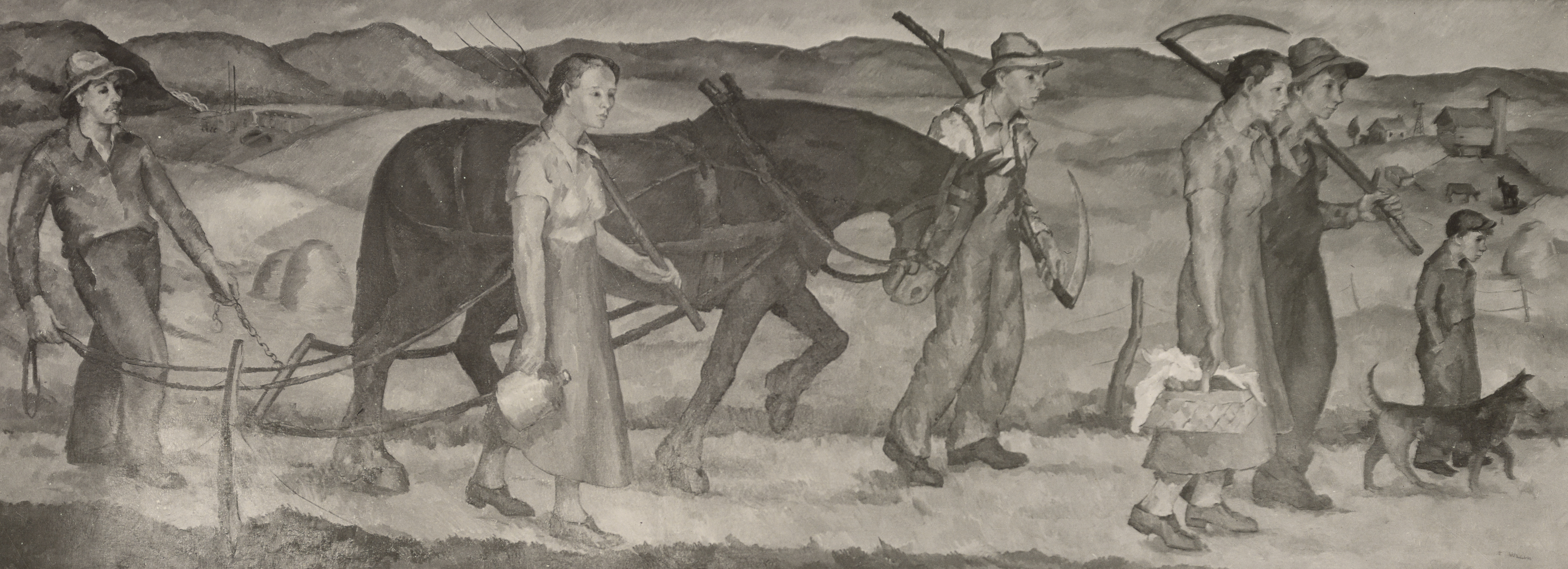
Return from the Fields, 1938

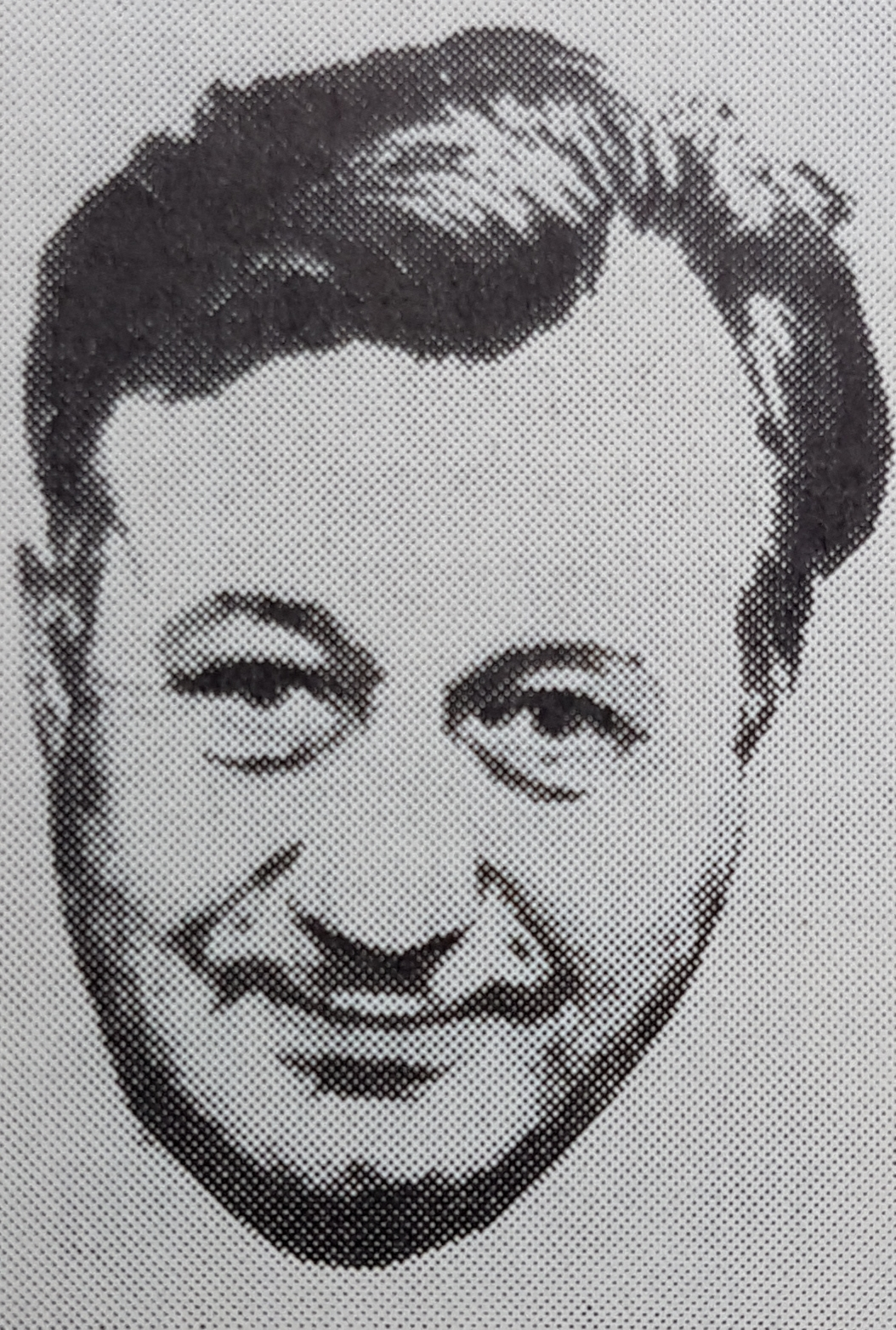
Elof Wedin, self-portrait from Allhems Svenskt konstnärslexikon
