= List of United States post office murals in the District of Columbia =

Following is a list of United States post office murals created in the District of Columbia between 1934 and 1943.

Location	Mural title	Image	Artist	Date	Notes	NRHP listed
William Jefferson Clinton Federal Building	The Pony Express		Frank Mechau	1937	The former U.S. Postal Service building is now the Environmental Protection Agency headquarters, renamed the William Jefferson Clinton Federal Building	Yes
William Jefferson Clinton Federal Building	Dangers of the Mail		Frank Mechau	1937	The former U.S. Postal Service building is now the Environmental Protection Agency headquarters, renamed the William Jefferson Clinton Federal Building	Yes
William Jefferson Clinton Federal Building	The Nesters (destroyed)		Tom Lea	1937	The former U.S. Postal Service building is now the Environmental Protection Agency headquarters, renamed the William Jefferson Clinton Federal Building	Yes
William Jefferson Clinton Federal Building	Stage Coach Attacked by Bandits		William C. Palmer	1937	The former U.S. Postal Service building is now the Environmental Protection Agency headquarters, renamed the William Jefferson Clinton Federal Building	Yes
William Jefferson Clinton Federal Building	Covered Wagon Attacked by Indians		William C. Palmer	1937	The former U.S. Postal Service building is now the Environmental Protection Agency headquarters, renamed the William Jefferson Clinton Federal Building	Yes
William Jefferson Clinton Federal Building	Sorting the Mail		Reginald Marsh	1936	The former U.S. Postal Service building is now the Environmental Protection Agency headquarters, renamed the William Jefferson Clinton Federal Building	Yes
William Jefferson Clinton Federal Building	Unloading the Mail		Reginald Marsh	1936	The former U.S. Postal Service building is now the Environmental Protection Agency headquarters, renamed the William Jefferson Clinton Federal Building	Yes
William Jefferson Clinton Federal Building	Transportation of the Mail		Alfredo Crimi	1937	The former U.S. Postal Service building is now the Environmental Protection Agency headquarters, renamed the William Jefferson Clinton Federal Building	Yes
William Jefferson Clinton Federal Building	Post Office Work Room		Alfredo Crimi	1937	The former U.S. Postal Service building is now the Environmental Protection Agency headquarters, renamed the William Jefferson Clinton Federal Building	Yes
William Jefferson Clinton Federal Building	Mail Service in the Arctic		Rockwell Kent	1937	The former U.S. Postal Service building is now the Environmental Protection Agency headquarters, renamed the William Jefferson Clinton Federal Building	Yes
William Jefferson Clinton Federal Building	Mail Service in the Tropics		Rockwell Kent	1937	The former U.S. Postal Service building is now the Environmental Protection Agency headquarters, renamed the William Jefferson Clinton Federal Building	Yes
William Jefferson Clinton Federal Building	General Store and Post Office		Doris Lee	1938	The former U.S. Postal Service building is now the Environmental Protection Agency headquarters, renamed the William Jefferson Clinton Federal Building	Yes
William Jefferson Clinton Federal Building	Country Post		Doris Lee	1938	The former U.S. Postal Service building is now the Environmental Protection Agency headquarters, renamed the William Jefferson Clinton Federal Building	Yes
William Jefferson Clinton Federal Building	Writing the family letter		Alexander Brook	1939	The former U.S. Postal Service building is now the Environmental Protection Agency headquarters, renamed the William Jefferson Clinton Federal Building	Yes
William Jefferson Clinton Federal Building	Reading the family letter		Alexander Brook	1939	The former U.S. Postal Service building is now the Environmental Protection Agency headquarters, renamed the William Jefferson Clinton Federal Building	Yes
William Jefferson Clinton Federal Building	French explorers and Indians		Karl Free	1939	The former U.S. Postal Service building is now the Environmental Protection Agency headquarters, renamed the William Jefferson Clinton Federal Building	Yes
William Jefferson Clinton Federal Building	Arrival of mail in New Amsterdam		Karl Free	1939	The former U.S. Postal Service building is now the Environmental Protection Agency headquarters, renamed the William Jefferson Clinton Federal Building	Yes
