= Dangers of the Mail =

1937 mural by Frank Mechau

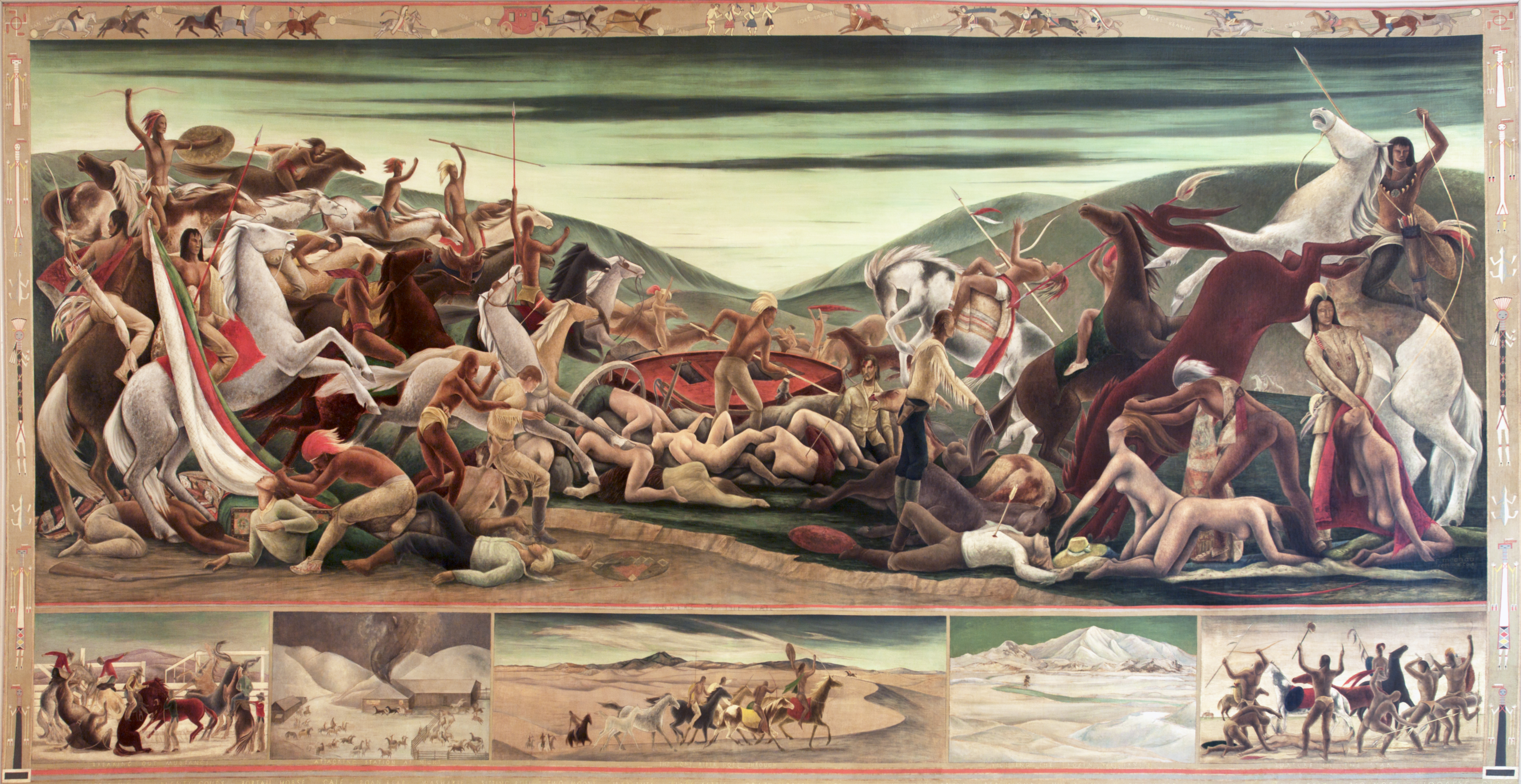
- Mechau's Dangers of the Mail photographed by Carol M. Highsmith
- Artist: Frank Mechau
- Year: 1937
- Subject: Attack on a mail coach
- Dimensions: 210 cm × 550 cm (84 in × 216 in)
- Location: William Jefferson Clinton Federal Building, Washington, D.C.

Dangers of the Mail is a 1937 mural by Frank Mechau installed in the William Jefferson Clinton Federal Building (formerly the Post Office Department Building) in Washington, D.C. Commissioned by Treasury Department Section of Fine Arts, the mural is one of 25 New Deal artworks in the building. Dangers of the Mail faced criticism and objections at the time of its creation for lewdness and in the 21st century for stereotypical portrayals of Native Americans and depictions of sexualized violence causing a hostile workplace environment. Since the early 2000s, the mural has been curtained from public view and is viewable only by appointment.

== History ==
The mural was commissioned through the Section of Fine Arts in 1935 in a New Deal art project designed to incorporate large works of art in the building. The mural was one of several specified to be "Romantic Subject Matter in the History of the Post" commissioned for the newly constructed headquarters of the Post Office Department.

Frank Mechau was recruited for the program by Edward Rowan, then assistant director of the section. Dangers of the Mail was completed in 1937, installed on the fifth floor of the Post Office Department Building, and unveiled in September.

== Description ==
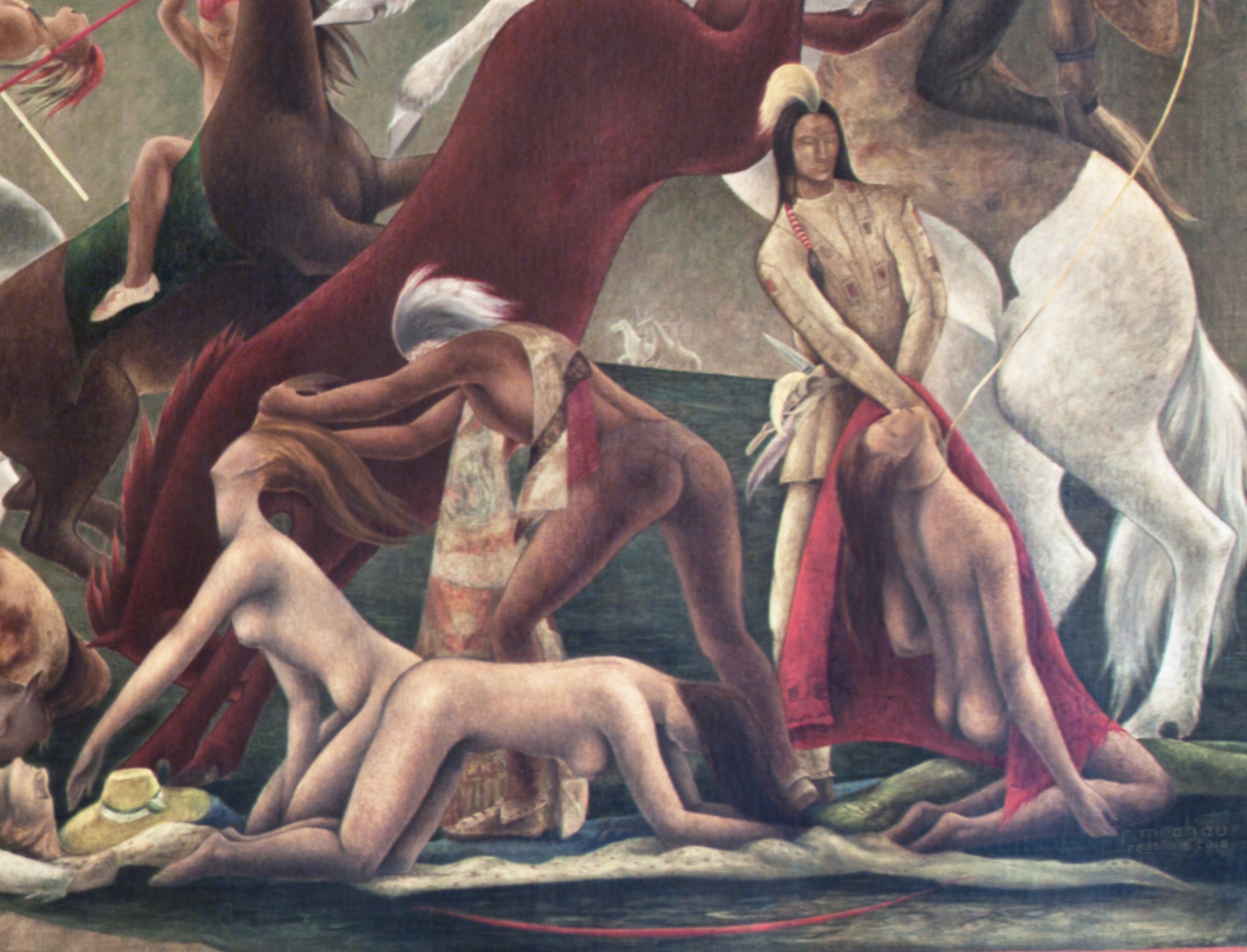
Detail from Dangers of the Mail

Dangers of the Mail portrays the ambush and violent attack by Native Americans on a mail stagecoach and its occupants. Researcher Jessy Ohl describes the central painting as showing three "naked white women (being) scalped in a sexually explicit manner" in the bottom right hand of the artwork, where they are shown kneeling and bent awkwardly toward the sky and ground by three Native Americans. The Washington Post in 2000 reported a critic saying of the scene, "That so much plays into the stereotype of the sexually violent savage. He's going to either rape her or scalp her or both". Art historian Karal Ann Marling describes the figures of the women as "clearly female, to be sure, thanks to volumetric mass".

Along with the main painting, there are five vignettes below the main painting and simpler designs along the top and side borders. The mural is 7 by 18 feet (2.1 by 5.5 m).

== Objections ==
In March 1937, before it had been unveiled, images appeared in a two-page spread in Time, which drew "thousands of letters of protest" of the nudity and criticism for historical inaccuracies. Other critics objected to the portrayal of nude female figures being scalped or strangled; some to government-funded portrayals of female nudity and "lewd content". The controversy over the nude female figures eventually required Rowan and Mechau to defend the work, with Rowan making arguments that the nude figures were small and merely "symbolic motifs" and Mechau arguing that the women were being only "roughly handled". Rowan instructed Mechau to finish the work and get it installed as quickly as possible on the expectation that once the mural was in effect a fait accompli, the objections would eventually blow over. He dismissed suggestions that the figures be painted in clothing as likely to result in renewed negative publicity. He recommended Mechau look for historical evidence that Native Americans "actually tore the clothes from their victims" and told him to avoid the press, postal leadership, and legislators.

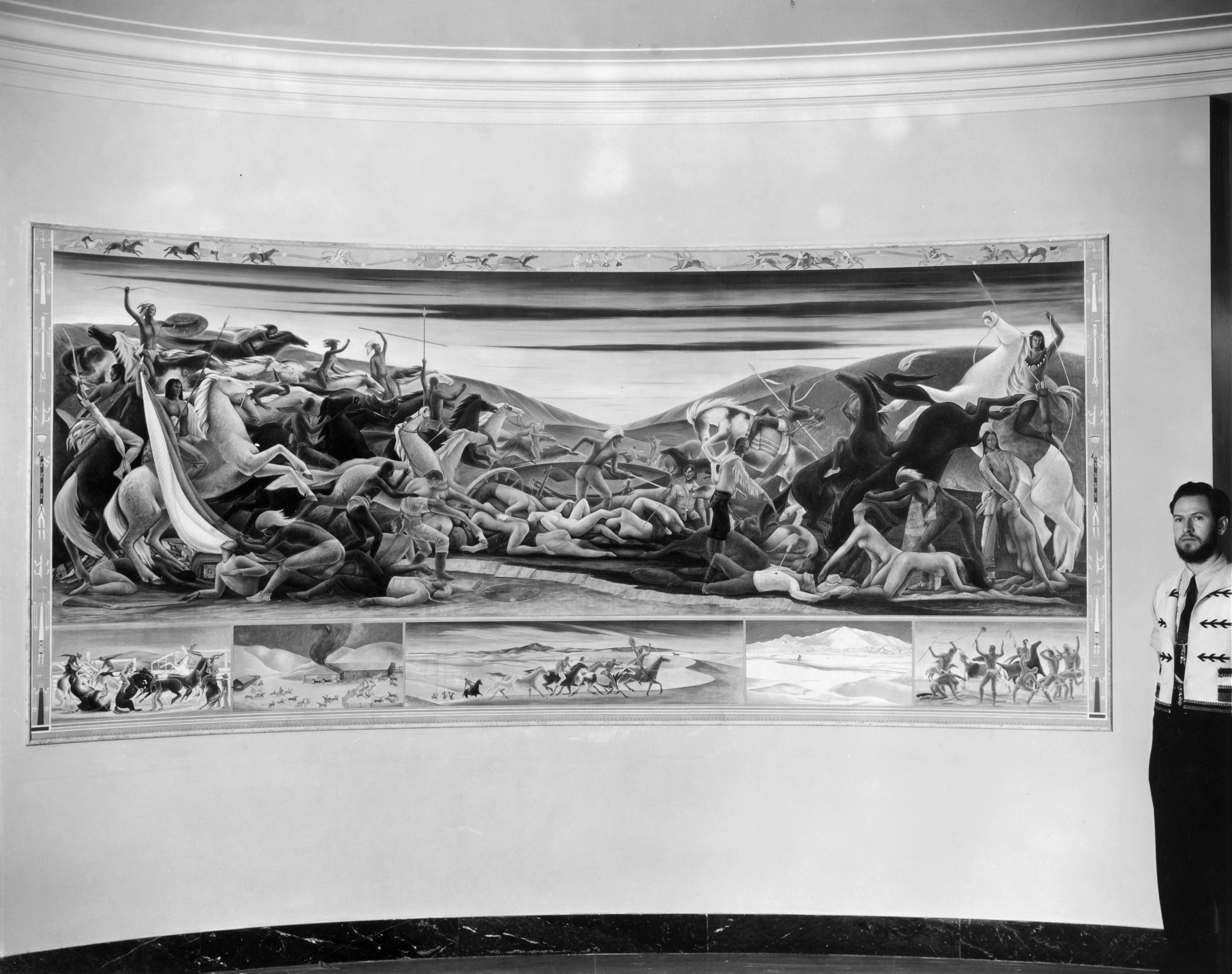
Mechau with the mural

Mechau arrived for the installation with documentation about scalping techniques and, according to art historian Marling, "Indian preferences in the matter of costuming appropriate for victims". The painting was installed in September 1937, after which Bureau of Indian Affairs commissioner John Collier ridiculed Rowan's and Mechau's earlier statements defending the depictions, calling the painting "a slaughter against pioneer women". Washington's Evening Star, without mentioning the nude women, immediately called the mural "Art at its Worst", said it had "shocked all who have seen it", accused "government doles" of "foster[ing]...radicalism in art", and accompanied its review with a recounting of Phoebe Atwood Taylor's Octagon House, a story of a town so scandalized by an offensive post office mural that members of the community broke in after hours and painted over it.

After the early objections to the mural, the Treasury Department Section of Fine Arts developed a new review policy for mural designs that might be controversial.

New objections to the mural arose after 2000 when the U.S. Environmental Protection Agency (EPA) made the building its headquarters. This time, several EPA employees argued that the mural, along with five others in the building, conveyed stereotypical portrayals of women and Native Americans and contributed to a hostile work environment.

A 2005 complaint, filed on behalf of EPA employees regarding six murals in what was then called the Ariel Rios Federal Building, asserted that the various murals depicted Native Americans in a racist manner. As the controversy wore on, Dangers of the Mail became the primary issue (most of the original complaints were about the Dangers of the Mail, another Mechau mural entitled Pony Express, and Ward Lockwood's Opening of the Southwest and Consolidation of the West).

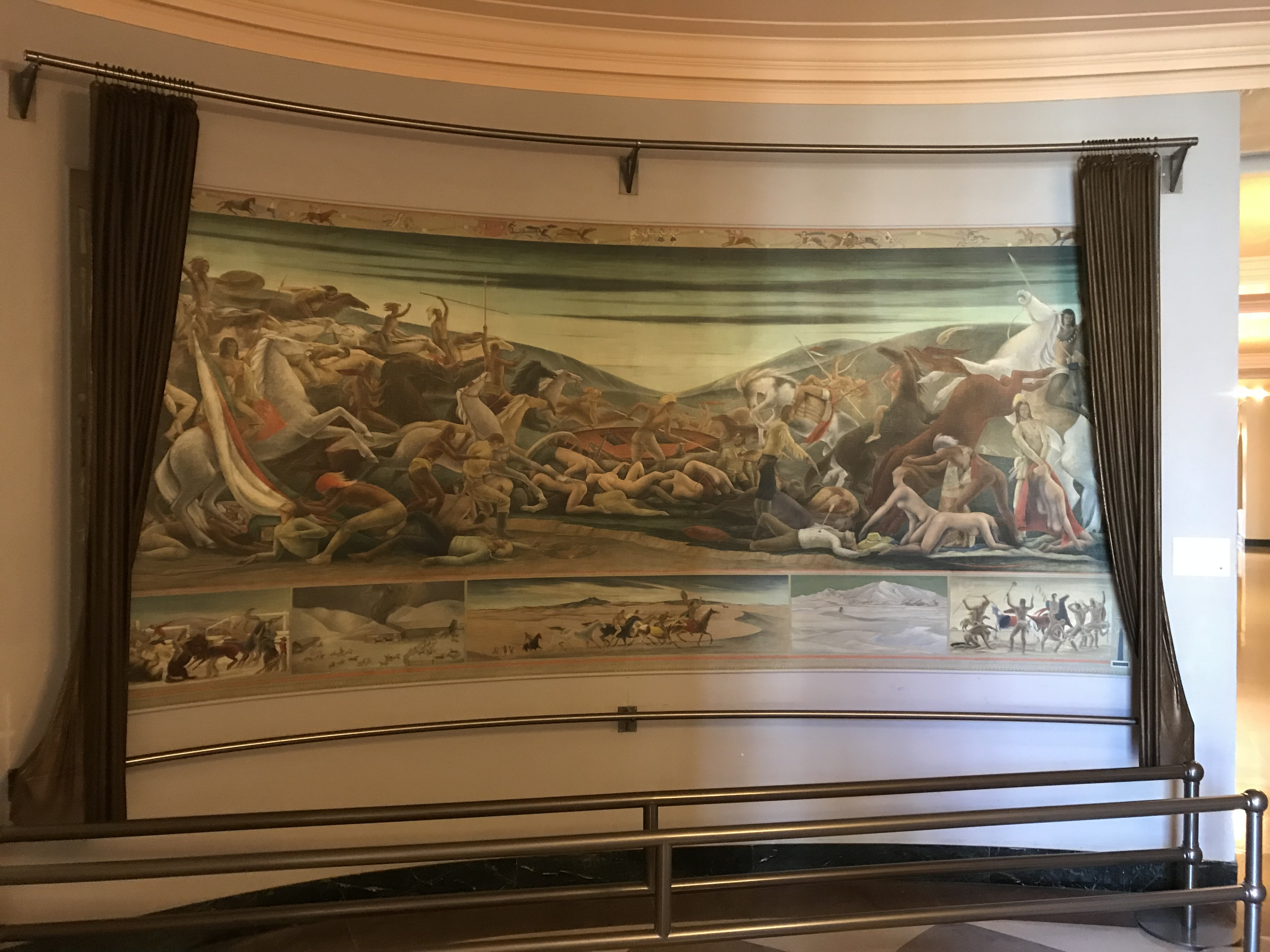
Dangers of the Mail with its curtains open for viewing

In 2007, the General Services Administration, which is responsible for the management of federal buildings in the United States, agreed to install a movable screen in front of Dangers of the Mail and to "incorporate revised interpretative materials to address the history of the art and the controversy associated with the mural". A "comprehensive interpretive program" was developed for all 22 murals in the building, including Mechau's Dangers of the Mail and Pony Express, Lockwood's Opening of the Southwest and Consolidation of the West, William C. Palmer's Covered Wagon Attacked by Indians, and Karl R. Free's French Huguenots in Florida, which were the ones named in the filing.

== Access for viewing ==
Researcher Jessy Ohl recounts learning of the mural's existence through a colleague at the EPA who told of "a ritualistic practice of viewing the painting for new members of the agency". As of 2019, access for viewing requires scheduling an appointment with a General Services Administration employee.

== Critical analysis ==
In 1982 art historian Marling pointed out that the women in the bottom right of the painting were the only figures in the painting without faces or clothing and that they "(existed) solely to be preyed upon and maimed".

In 2015, the Colorado Springs Business Journal called it possibly "the nation's most dangerous painting". In 2010 Sandra Starr, writing in Smithsonian's American Indian magazine, called it "easily the most controversial of all these (images of Native Americans in New Deal commissioned post office art)".

Ohl, in 2019, wrote, "Far from reflecting an impartial or even faintly recorded 'History of the Post', Dangers of the Mail instead condenses titillating imagery of Western expansion epitomized in early American literature, film, television, and theatrical performance."

== See also ==
- List of United States post office murals
