= Karl R. Free =

American painter and museum curator (1903–1947)

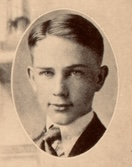
- Karl Free, Blackhawk Annual (1921)
- Born: Karl Rudolph Free; May 16, 1903; Scott County, Iowa, U.S.
- Died: February 16, 1947 (aged 43); New York, New York, U.S.

Karl Rudolph Free (May 16, 1903 – February 16, 1947) was an American artist and museum curator, best known for his New Deal-era post office murals.

Many of his surviving works on paper are circus scenes in watercolor. Early in his career he was recognized for his etchings and prints, often on religious themes. His art is in the collections of the Metropolitan Museum of Art, the Whitney, and MoMA in New York City; the Philadelphia Museum of Art; and the Figge Art Museum in his hometown of Davenport, Iowa.

== Early years ==
Free was born in Scott County, Iowa, in 1903, the second of the five children of mail carrier Henry Rudolph Free and his wife Anna (Eckhardt). He completed four years of high school, graduating from Davenport High in 1921.

In 1923, Free won a scholarship to study at the Art Students League of New York. His teachers included Allen Tucker, Joseph Pennell, Boardman Robinson, and Kenneth Hayes Miller. A newspaper art critic visited Pennell's class in spring 1924 and reported that "Karl Free, in a delicately drawn composition, amusingly caricatures palm trees."

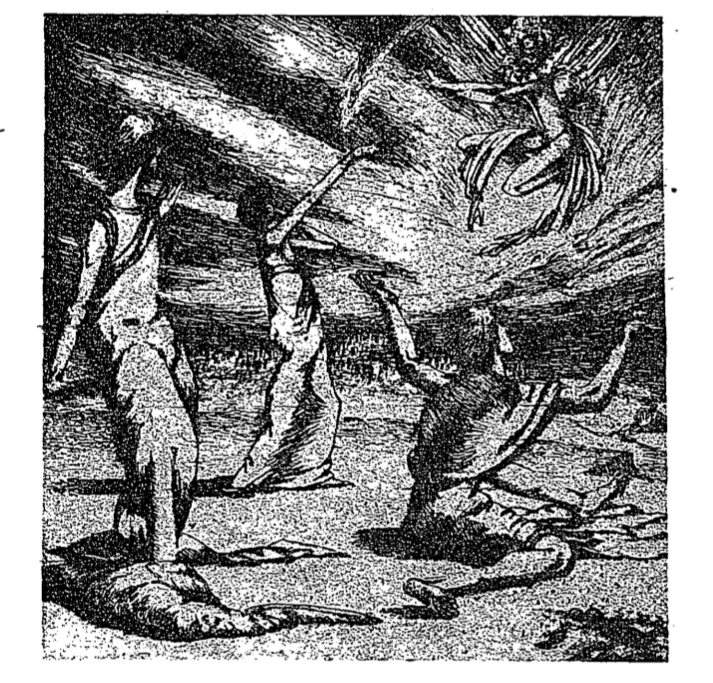
Annunciation to the Shepherds (1924) by Karl Free, Brooklyn Society of Etchers show

Free was positively reviewed in a New York Evening Post article about the 1925 Whitney Studio show. In 1927, he had a painting listed for $150 in a Whitney catalog; the highest priced painting in the catalog was $3,500 for a picture by John Sloan, one of the leaders of the Ashcan School. (This may have been the 12th annual Whitney Studio show.) In 1928, he sold a painting, Landscape with Ponies, for $150, less commission of 20 to 25 percent, at a Whitney Studio Club show hosted by the Arts and Crafts Club of New Orleans.

In January 1929, he had a one-man exhibition of nine of his watercolors and oil paintings at the Whitney Studio Galleries on Eighth Street. There were four one-man shows, each with their own space within the building; the other artists were Henri Burkhard, Max Kuehne, and Joseph Pollet. Edward Alden Jewell, art critic of The New York Times, visited the show and wrote positively of Free's painting: "There is magic in the lane that runs between dense rows of trees and in the Rising Storm. It is the delicate spell about to be cast, the sense of something hovering." Jewell also mentioned paintings called The Hunt and Legend. Rising Storm was reproduced in the "Exhibitions Coming and Going" column of the January 1929 issue of The Arts magazine.

In 1929, Free was included in a Whitney Studios show called the Circus in Paint. (Much of Free's work that remains in the Whitney collection takes the circus as subject matter; these pictures may date from this show.) Free's The Parade was reproduced in a Vogue magazine article by Helen Appleton Read (Note: Read's sister Mary Appleton had worked at the Whitney since its founding.) about this show. She wrote:

Mr. Free is still in his twenties, but he has remained curiously aloof from the stylisms and technical virtuosity that frequently characterize youthful expression in the fine arts. He presents his fantastic themes with disarming directness...It is characteristic of this artist's work that, while adhering to reality, he is apt to seize upon some unusual angle of perspective or emphasize some fantastic episode, which gives the drawings a curiously arresting quality.

(As a counterpoint, in 1991 some of Free's circus paintings were included in a show called Under the Big Top at the Heckscher Museum on Long Island; a critic from The New York Times described them as "stiff, crowded compositions [that] fail to communicate the verve of the three-ring extravaganza.")

Free was included in a show at the Gladys Roosevelt Dick Gallery in summer 1929. Five "mounted watercolors" by Free, $60 each, were included in the Whitney's 1929 Christmas sale.

== Whitney Museum assistant curator ==
Free was hired in 1930 as an assistant or associate curator, responsible for prints, at the newly founded Whitney Museum of American Art. (Avis Berman, who wrote the major biography of Whitney founding director Juliana Force, says he was responsible for watercolors.) The other founding curators were Hermon More, Lloyd Goodrich, and Edmund Archer. At the time of the founding, Free and Goodrich were both noted as students at the National Academy of Design. Archer, More, and Free "lived in studios on the premises," as did Beauford Delaney, who was hired as a museum guard, "with free studio and living space in the basement."

A cast-aluminum "white metal" eagle designed by Free, once prominently displayed above the front door of Whitney Museum's original Eighth Street location, was uncovered in 2015. It had been installed in approximately 1931 when the architects gave the building a "coating of salmon-colored stucco and a modernistic entranceway [of] severe white marble columns [that] support a giant entablature, itself topped by an eagle." The eagle has been described as a "guardian figure...crouched protectively over the door." The eagle was later adapted for the museum's stationery. Free's 1931 design was later "sculpted by Lewis Iselin on a 1954 commission and cast by Roman Bronze Works." (The Whitney moved around Manhattan over the years; this bronze eagle was eventually relocated to Washington, D.C., thanks in part to efforts of First Lady Jacqueline Kennedy.)

Bruce Buttfield primarily designed the interiors of the original Whitney building, but Free was one of four artists said to have contributed additional "decorative detail" of the space.

Free contributed two essays to the catalog for the Whitney's first themed exhibition in 1932, "Provincial Paintings of the 19th Century, Audubon Prints, Colored Lithographs, and Thomas Nast Cartoons from the Permanent Collection," one articulating the artistic merits of scientific illustration represented by Audubon's work, and one on the history of lithography, a low-cost printing process that made art more readily accessible to the masses.

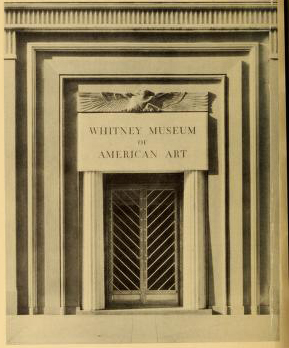
Original Whitney building entrance, photographed in the 1930s

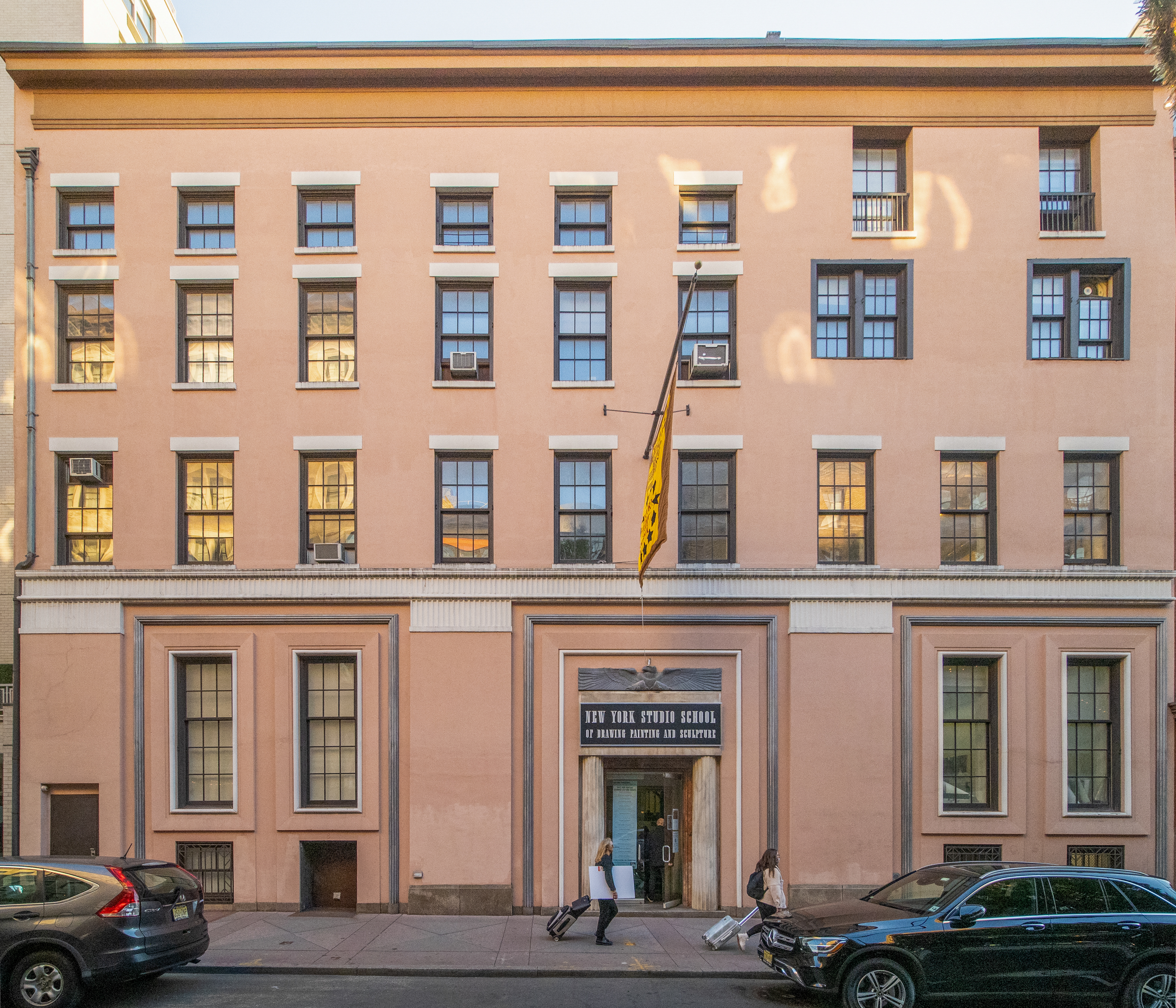
New York Studio School of Drawing, Painting and Sculpture, photographed 2021

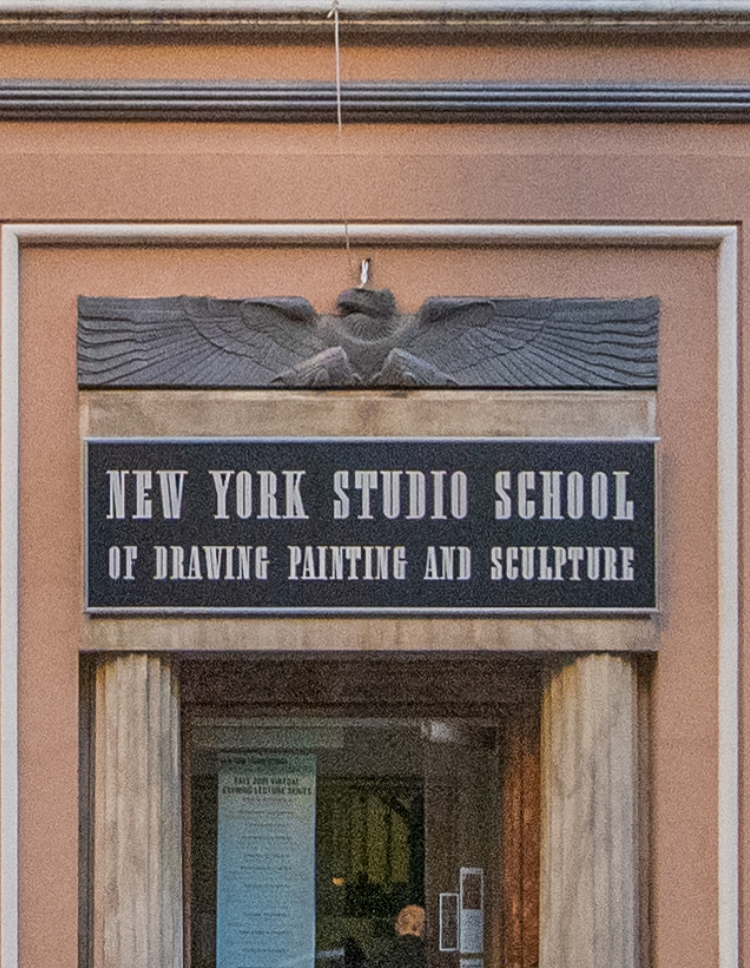
Zoom in on original Whitney Museum eagle reportedly designed by Karl Free

Online passenger manifests and library catalog entries describing Free's sketchbooks indicate that he traveled back and forth to Europe several times in the late 1920s and early 1930s. His 1929 watercolor Souvenir of Brussels was shown in the Art Institute of Chicago's Century of Progress exhibition in 1933.

In a 1970 memoir piece published in American Heritage magazine, Edward Laning recalled that in 1934, with the Great Depression well upon them:

...the plight of all artists was growing desperate. A demonstration was held in front of the Whitney Museum on Eighth Street, complete with placards and chants and shouted imprecations, and was dispersed by the police. My friend Karl Free, a curator of the Whitney and one of the most brilliant artists of the time, leaned out an upper window of the beleaguered museum and called to many of the demonstrators below, 'I know you, So-and-So, and you, Such-and-Such,' implying that he meant to blacklist them forever.

(Whitney Museum director Juliana Force was also regional chairman of the Public Works of Art Project. The artists were protesting at her Whitney office against a government edict that she reduce the number of PWAP-employed artists by half from a maximum of 722 by May 1, 1934.)

In spring 1935, the Whitney put on the first-ever American show of abstract painting, primarily organized by Karl Free and Hermon More. Rebels on Eighth Street, the major published history of the museum's early years, calls this "an act of vision on the part of More and Free...because they...were much more at home with representational art."

On June 19, 1935, Karl R. Free, as "assignor to the Whitney Museum of American Art", was granted U.S. patent number 1,963,124 for an "assembled picture frame".

In 1936, Free had a pair of pictures, Acrobats and Fantasia, included in an exhibit at the Art Institute of Chicago.

In 1937, he designed costumes for the Ballet Caravan production of Pocahontas, composed by Elliott Carter. The designs are held at the Museum of Modern Art in New York. Four pictures from the larger collection of 25 were included the Lincoln Kirstein's Modern show in 2019.

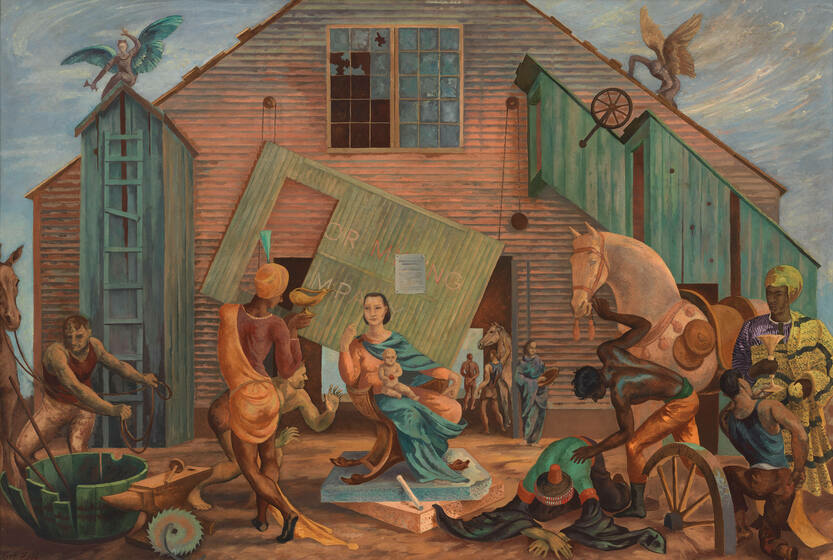
Epiphany (1932), oil on linen

In spring 1938 Free was one of three jurors for the American Institute of Graphic Arts Fifty American Prints show, held at the gallery of the Architectural League on E. 40th Street.

== Post office murals ==
Both of Free's United States post office murals with Native American subjects have been challenged as ethnographically incorrect and offensive; both remain in situ as historically significant exemplars of New Deal-era public artworks. The murals in the federal building are legally protected by the National Historic Preservation Act.

Traditional symbols like halos, scales of justice, or swords are weak not only because few significant painters have chosen, or been commissioned, to use them, but because our understanding of their meaning has changed. They are stale...The social and spiritual beliefs of our democracy are hard enough to express in words. They are much harder to express in visual or plastic symbols.

— Olin Dows, former Section of Fine Arts assistant director, 1963

=== Washington, D.C. ===
Arrival of the mail in New Amsterdam by Karl R. Free

French Huguenots in Florida by Karl R. Free

==== Creation ====
Sometime between 1936 and 1938 (artists had a two-year window within which to produce their commissions), the U.S. Department of the Treasury Section of Fine Arts hired Karl R. Free to paint two murals, Arrival of the Mail at New Amsterdam and French Huguenots in Florida, at what was then the headquarters of the United States Postal Service (now the William Jefferson Clinton Federal Building) in Washington, D.C.

The oil-on-canvas murals, which are 7 ft (2.1 m) tall by 13.5 ft (4.1 m) wide, are located on the seventh floor of the south wing of the building, in a space currently occupied by the Environmental Protection Agency and closed to the general public except during pre-arranged guided tours. French Huguenots in Florida is the title displayed on the placard beside the mural in the building; it is alternately called French Explorers and Indians.

Free was among six painters (the others being Alfred Crimi, George Harding, Ward Lockwood, Frank Mechau, and William C. Palmer) selected to fill 11 remaining mural spaces in the second part of a competition to adorn the Post Office and Justice buildings.

According to Karal Ann Marling's Wall to Wall America: Post Office Murals in the Great Depression, the image of the encounter between the French and Native Americans was rejected by the Treasury federal art department in 1935 because "the composition fails through the center." The same design was later accepted and publicized by the Treasury Department as re-enacting a "picturesque legend."

The French Huguenots in Florida mural is meant to depict the encounter on June 27, 1564, between Timucuan people and French Huguenots led by René Goulaine de Laudonnière. Free used a "1591 engraving by Theodorus de Bry of a sketch by Jacques Le Moyne" and a set of "1585–86 watercolors by John White that depict the [Algonquian-speaking people] of present-day North Carolina" as his visual models, resulting in a "picture that blends his cultural perceptions of the 1930s with the sixteenth-century source material."

==== Reception and objections ====
At the time of their unveiling in February 1938, the "Art Notes" column of The Washington Star wrote of the murals, "These works resemble in general character paintings by Howard Pyle and C. Y. Turner made in the last decade of the 19th century and the first of the 20th. They are reasonably historical and essentially pictorial. They do not, however, mark any progress in art." In 1941, The New York Times called them "conventionally decorative."

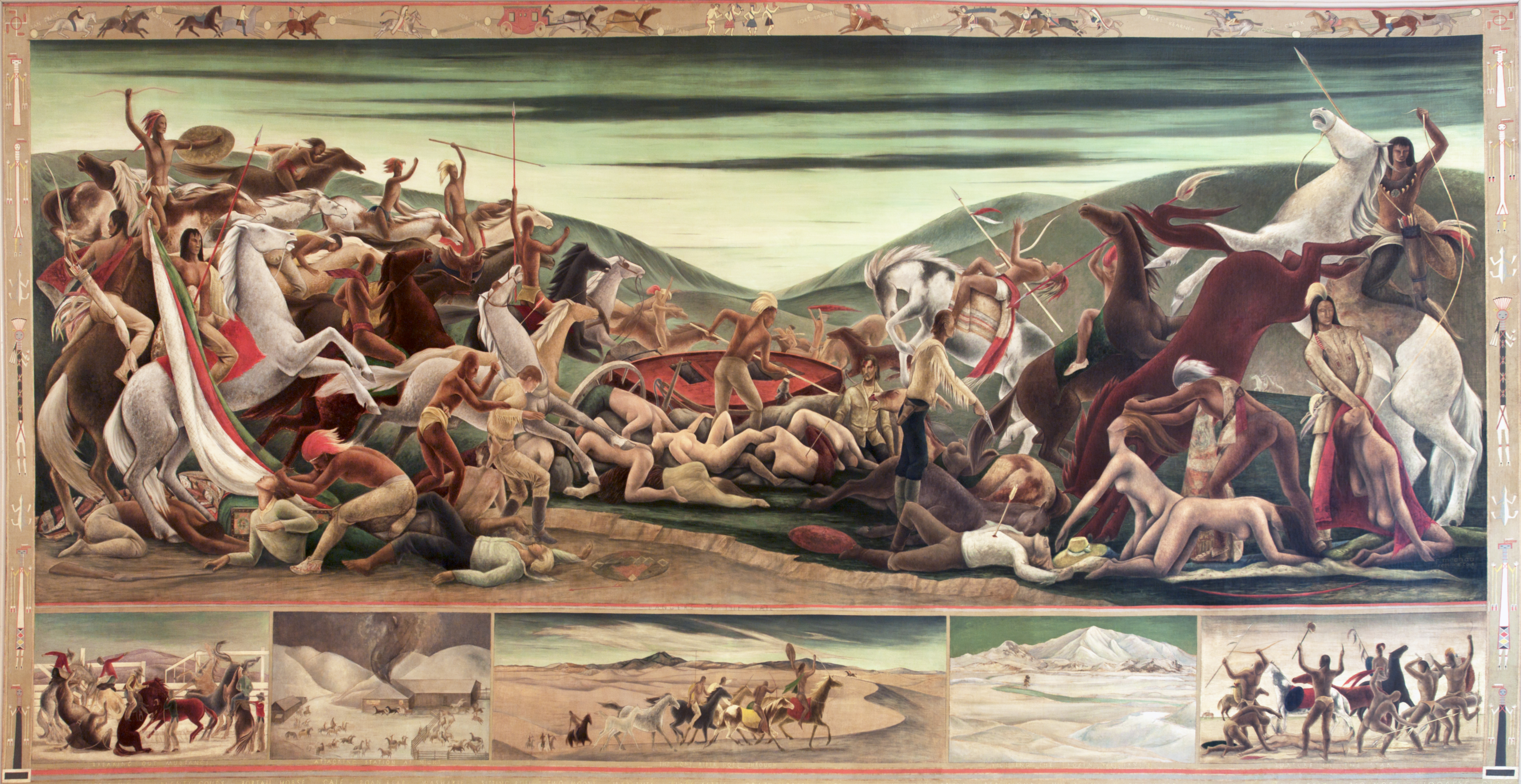
Mechau's Dangers of the Mail

A 2005 complaint (filed on behalf of EPA employees) about six murals with Native American subject matter in what was then called the Ariel Rios Federal Building, asserted that French Huguenots in Florida "depicts passivity and submission toward the French explorers. American Indian men are naked or wearing only a loin cloth, and the American Indian women are bare-breasted." As the controversy wore on, Frank Mechau's mural depicting an ambush of a mail coach by Native Americans, Dangers of the Mail, became the primary issue (most of the original complaints were about the Mechau and Lockwood murals).

In 2007, the General Services Administration, which is responsible for the management of federal buildings in the United States, agreed to install a movable screen in front of Dangers of the Mail, that would "incorporate revised interpretative materials to address the history of the art and the controversy associated with the mural." A "comprehensive interpretive program" was also developed for all 22 murals in the building, including all of those with Native American subject matter: Mechau's Dangers of the Mail and Pony Express, Ward Lockwood's Opening of the Southwest and Consolidation of the West, William C. Palmer's Covered Wagon Attacked by Indians, and Free's French Huguenots in Florida.

=== Princeton, New Jersey ===
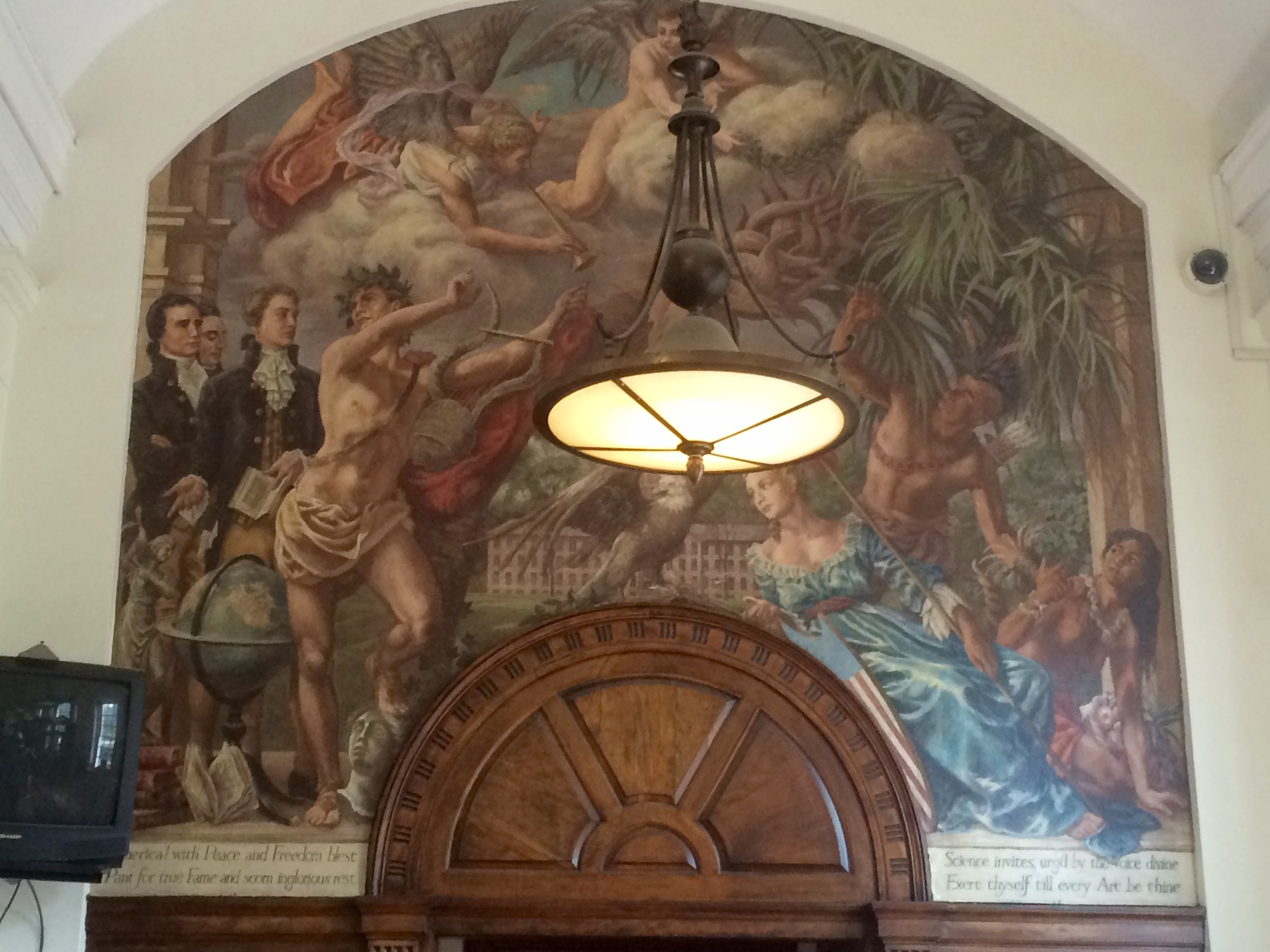
Columbia Under the Palm (1939) mural painted by Karl Free, at the Palmer Square Post Office (photographed 2015)

In 1939, Free painted a third post office mural, a tempera and oil on canvas-adhered-to-plaster piece called Columbia Under the Palm, for the Palmer Square Post Office in what is now the landmarked Princeton Historic District in New Jersey.

Post office muralists hired by the Treasury Section of Fine Arts were encouraged to represent "local industry, scenery, pursuits or history." In this case, nearby Princeton University is represented by the 1756 landmark Nassau Hall and "a clutch of Trumbull founding fathers" who graduated from the colonial College of New Jersey.

==== Creation ====
According to Democratic Vistas: Post Offices and Public Art in the New Deal, academic artist Leon Kroll (who completed two murals for the U.S. Department of Justice building in 1937) turned down the Princeton job in January 1938, writing, "I do not see why an artist of my standing in the profession should do the job under the circumstances...the [post office lobby] area is quite awful...dirty and lacks dignity." (Contemporary observers admire the 1932 Charles Klauder-designed Classical Revival building for its vaulted ceiling, Art Deco brass chandeliers, and extensive wood paneling.)

Free seems to have come onto the scene in May 1938. According to a now-lost typescript that used to hang near the mural, "Mr. Free was awarded his commission as a result of competent work executed for the Treasury Department art projects." On the advice of local postmaster Stephen W. Margerum, Free would seek the guidance of the Princeton art and archaeology department as to the picture's content. The only restriction was a dictate from Washington that there be no war-related subject matter.

The mural was approved by a citizens committee led by Princeton art department chair Charles Rufus Morey. (Little information is available about this Princeton committee but a mural selection committee "delegated by the Procurement Division of the Treasury Department" had been formed in 1935 to find an artist for the nearby Freehold, N.J., post office mural; the chairman was Peter Teigen of Princeton, joined by Morey, Arthur Pope of Harvard, and architect W.S. Holmes. Prof. Teigen died in 1936.)

The mural was installed on Saturday, August 26, 1939. Per that Friday's Princeton Herald:

The subject, "America Under the Palm," was suggested by an allegorical engraving by Trenchard which appeared in the Columbian Magazine, 1789...in the center is the following verse which seems most appropriate today:
America! with Peace and Freedom blest
Pant for true Fame and scorn inglorious rest.
Science invites, urg'd by the Voice divine,
Exert thyself 'til every Art be thine.

The lines in the Free mural are quoted directly from the Columbian Magazine engraving; the Columbian image is itself derivative of an older 1770s engraving from L' Histoire philosophique et politique des établissements et du commerce des Européens dans les deux Indes. A literary historian notes that tropical Caribbean imagery of the Columbian engraving was "the last significant appropriation of the palm tree for national iconography in the publications of the early republic."

==== Reception and objections ====
According to art historian Marling, Free's Princeton mural was "generic classicism" and "reheated leftovers" even by the cautious, nearly anxious, standards of the Treasury's Fine Art Section. She suggests that by the time work was underway on Columbia Under the Palm, the leaders of the Section (Edward Bruce, Edward Rowan, and Forbes Watson) felt that the piece was substandard but that they were helpless to restrain him:

When the Section made a grave error, the Section learned to live with it, and Free was one such mistake...In Columbia Under the Palm, the difference between a sound historian and an academic reactionary disguised as a historian became clear at last...the mural was exactly the kind of obscure allegorical middle Bruce habitually ridiculed...[but] the Section felt honor bound to accept a picture limned with the fine Italian hand of an arch-conservative...The Section's only viable recourse was to strike Karl Free's name from the list of candidates for further commissions.

The first published report of controversy about the mural's content appeared less than a year later, in the university's student newspaper The Daily Princetonian on May 14, 1940:

Bediapered Greek in Post Office Mural Arouses Wrath of Local Anti-Nudists ¶ "Women come in here continually to complain about that naked man," said Postmaster Stephen W. Margerum yesterday concerning the mural which hangs on the south wall of the Princeton Post Office. "I don't have any extra clothes to lend him, I don't know what happened to the artist that painted the picture and I haven't the least idea how that nudist got in there with James Madison and Light Horse Harry Lee. ¶ "A man named Free painted that picture," he continued, "and he went back to New York without telling anybody what it was about. I know that the three Princeton men in the mural, Madison, Lee and Frenau [sic] are the ones wearing the pants—but I can't imagine who that Greek in diapers could be." ¶ "I don't see why women should get excited about the man without a suit—no men have complained to me about that Indian squaw on the right and you notice she isn't very well dressed either." ¶ The postmaster disappeared into his sanctum santorum, still puzzling over the problem.

("Father of the Constitution" James Madison and "Poet of the Revolution" Philip Freneau graduated in 1771 from the College of New Jersey, now Princeton University; Revolutionary War officer and Virginia politician Henry "Light-Horse Harry" Lee III graduated in 1773.)

In November 1979, while researching New Deal art of New Jersey for a forthcoming exhibit in conjunction with City Without Walls, Hildreth York of the Rutgers-Newark art department and Stuart White of Rutgers-Newark's Robeson Center Gallery visited the Princeton mural. At that time they found below the mural a printed description of the piece, a biography of Free, and an explanation of the work of the Section.

The Rutgers team later wrote:

We are pleased to note that this is the original typed note that must have accompanied the installation of the mural, and, indeed, it seems to hang on the original rusty nail...[The mural] is a 'phantasmagorical anomaly,' as we try to explain to our students, hoping they will not ask what that means. We can do no better than repeat the descriptive information hung beneath the mural...'The genius of Foderate [sic] America is represented sitting under a palm tree, the Emblem of Peace. The tree is adorned with a wreath of laurel entwining the Badges of Liberty — the Pole and the Cap. Around the Genius of America are symbols of Commerce, Science, Agriculture, and Plenty. Apollo, having heard the Trumpet of the Goddess of Fame, appears — he points to the Temple and casts a splendor on the path leading to its portal.

The Rutgers researchers identify the Founders pictured as Madison, Freneau and (rather than Lee) Hugh Henry Brackenridge, salutatorian of the College of New Jersey class of 1771.

By the late 1990s, writers in local newspapers were describing Columbia Under the Palm as, alternately, the "charming, if unlikely, get-together of Founding Fathers, Greek Gods, and several angels" or, a picture "unabashed in its racism and assertions of white superiority."

In 2000, as the mural's content was being challenged by students and community members, Village Voice writer Jyoti Thottam (since 2022, opinion-page editor of The New York Times) described it as "an ornate mishmash with neo-Classical pretensions." According to the Courier News of Bridgewater, New Jersey, in a 2004 report about ongoing public objection to the artwork, "The admittedly tacky painting depicts a trio of somber, ornately attired European men being led forward by an Apollonian figure and heralded by trumpeting angels. On the opposite side of the painting, a pair of red-skinned Native Americans rear back as if about to flee. The European men stand surrounded by the trappings of classical learning, while the natives half hide within lush jungle fronds...He even inscribed beneath the painting four lines of vapid doggerel, also open to racist interpretations, which has further incensed some observers."

The picture is sometimes locally called America Under the Palms. The postal-service operation relocated to 259 Nassau Street in 2015, and the building was sold to a private owner. The mural will be preserved as a historic element of the building. It is intended to be the centerpiece of a planned Mural Dining Room at a bar and restaurant.

== 1939 and beyond ==
Days after Free installed Columbia Under the Palm at the Princeton post office, Nazi Germany invaded Poland and a world war was on.

The book Iowa Artists of the First Hundred Years, published for the centenary of Iowa Territory, reported that native son Free had two pictures, Landscape, Oyster Bay, and Entry of the White Horse, in the Whitney collection, and one, Rising Storm, at the Davenport Municipal Art Gallery (now the Figge Museum).

According to an oral-history interview with long-time Whitney curator Lloyd Goodrich, it was around this time, after Europe was embroiled but before the United States joined the shooting war, that Free was laid off from the museum staff.

Edmund Archer and Karl Free were allowed to resign, which was awfully hard for Mrs. Force, I'm sure, and for them certainly. A certain amount of bitterness came out of this, I'm afraid...In any case, we discontinued our print activities...that involved Karl Free, and he retired from the museum. I think that was the late 1930s.

According to Avis Berman's history of the early years of the Whitney, their dismissal was effective June 1, 1940. Archer was let go because of belt-tightening, partially as a result of the Museum having overinvested in the 1939 New York World's Fair bond offering, which ultimately had poor returns.

Free was fired because he intentionally antagonized his boss, Force, who he believed was a "tyrant and a peacock...her feminine frivolities were getting on his nerves." In May 1940, she asked him to make a poster for British war relief, his creation insulted both Force personally and the United Kingdom generally. Free apparently later wrote a friend that his firing was his own fault.

Free has two entries in the 1940 census, indicating he may have moved during the enumeration and thus been counted twice. In both entries his occupation is listed as curator/artist; one address is E. 15th Street and the other is W. 28th Street.

The Souvenir of Brussels (1929) that Free showed in Chicago in 1933 (or a picture with an identical name and date) was lent to the Metropolitan Museum of Art by the C.W. Kraushaar Art Galleries for a show called "A Special Loan Exhibition of Contemporary American Water Colors" held October 16 to November 9, 1941. The museum purchased the picture for their collection that same year. Also in 1941, the Metropolitan Museum of Art purchased Free's watercolor painting called Waiting. The U.S. Department of State sponsored an exhibition called Contemporary Painting in the United States (La pintura contemporánea Norteamericana) that was sent to South America in 1941; it included Free's watercolors Entry of the White Horse and Finale, pulled from the permanent collection of the Whitney.

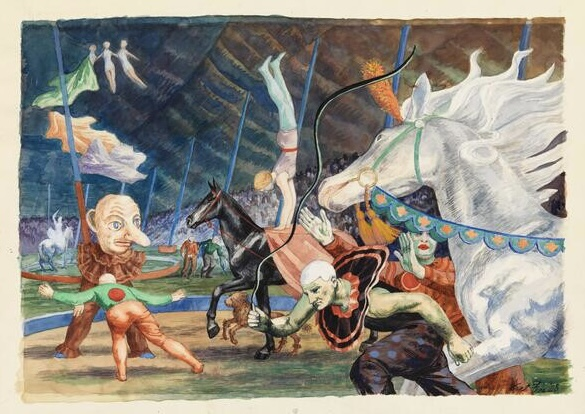
Entry of the White Horse (1928), watercolor

There are no apparent records of Free's activities after 1940 or of any artwork produced after 1941.

Free died by gas-oven suicide in his two-room apartment at 649 2nd Ave. in New York City in 1947. The police were summoned by a neighbor around 9:30 p.m. and broke down the door to the kitchen. Free's body was cremated and his remains were placed alongside those of his parents in the Ferncliff Mausoleum at Ferncliff Cemetery in Westchester County, New York.

Laning mentioned Free's suicide in the 1970 article, writing "Karl was of German extraction and had decidedly Nazi sympathies—during the first year of the Second World War he committed suicide." Francis V. O'Connor, who interviewed Laning and wrote the surrounding background material for the American Heritage article, cut the Nazi sympathizer comment from the Laning chapter of his book The New Deal Art Projects: An Anthology of Memoirs (1972). Berman's Whitney history, however, citing "interview with Laning" expands on the Nazi sympathizer allegations, directly quoting Laning: "He thought the Germans had gotten a terrible deal after World War I, and consequently he was pro-Hitler." According to Berman, Free had "wisely concealed his political views on the job, but he had a self-destructive streak" that ultimately led to his downfall at the museum. (Note: Berman relates that without her knowledge Juliana Force's servants were using her remote country home as a secret meeting site for the German-American Bund pro-Nazi group; FBI investigators found that the house was also being used as a mail drop.)

Laning's recollection about the year of Free's death, as published in the American Heritage article, was mistaken, but he was not incorrect about Free's ancestry. According to the rolls of the 1920 census, Free, his parents, and his siblings were all native-born Americans; his paternal grandparents were Dutch-speaking immigrants from Holland, and his maternal grandparents were German-speaking German immigrants. The Smithsonian Institution catalog record for Free's sketchbooks states, "Portions are in German," from which we can infer that Free was bilingual.

One of Free's younger brothers, Richard Henry Free (1914–2001), had a long military career with the United States Army, ranking as a lieutenant colonel at the time of Free's suicide and retiring as a major general. Maj. Gen. Free is buried in section 11 of Arlington National Cemetery. Free's other younger brother and his brother-in-law were both officers in the United States Navy during WWII.

In the oral history interview conducted 1962–63, Lloyd Goodrich described Free as "quite unworldly."

== See also ==
- List of United States post office murals
- Nazism in the Americas
- Artists Union, group that organized the protests at the Whitney
