= Figure Away =

1937 novel by Phoebe Atwood Taylor

- First edition
- Author: Phoebe Atwood Taylor
- Language: English
- Series: Asey Mayo
- Genre: Mystery, Detective novel
- Publisher: W. W. Norton & Company
- Publication date: 1937
- Publication place: United States
- Media type: Print (Hardback & Paperback)
- Pages: 222 pp (Pyramid paperback edition, 1967)
- OCLC: 1387806
- Preceded by: Out of Order (1936)
- Followed by: Octagon House (1937)

Figure Away, first published in 1937, is a detective story by Phoebe Atwood Taylor which features her series detective Asey Mayo, the "Codfish Sherlock". This novel is a mystery of the type known as a whodunnit. In 1939, the novel was serialised by several newspapers as ‘Old Home Week Murder’.

== Plot summary ==
Cape Cod's resident detective Asey Mayo is asked to take a hand with respect to some mysterious disturbances that threaten the success of Billingsgate's "Old Home Week", a local festival mounted to stave off the small town's bankruptcy. The week of homespun celebrations is soon marred by the murder of an antiques dealer and there is no shortage of suspects, both local and "come-from-awayers"; someone has been sabotaging the festival and occasionally taking the place of one of the mannequins on the lawn of the murdered antiques dealer. Asey Mayo finally tracks down the identity of the murderer and learns who's been moving the "figure away".
