= File for Record =

1943 novel by Phoebe Atwood Taylor

File For Record
- First edition (US)
- Author: Phoebe Atwood Taylor (writing as Alice Tilton)
- Language: English
- Series: Leonidas Witherall mysteries
- Genre: Mystery novel / Whodunnit
- Publisher: Norton (US, 1943); Collins (UK, 1944)
- Publication date: 1943
- Publication place: United States
- Media type: Print; hardcover and paperback
- OCLC: 16937609
- Preceded by: The Hollow Chest
- Followed by: Dead Ernest

File For Record is a novel that was published in 1943 by Phoebe Atwood Taylor writing as Alice Tilton. It is the sixth of the eight Leonidas Witherall mysteries.

== Plot summary ==
It's a rainy day in Dalton (a New England town near Boston) and Leonidas Witherall, "the man who looks like Shakespeare", is off to Haymaker's Department Store to retrieve his umbrella at the Lost and Found. When he enters the Lost and Found department, he's knocked unconscious and awakens in a horse-drawn bakery cart filled with French bread. While answering a call for his services as an air raid warden, he decides to call on Mr. Haymaker himself to complain, only to find Haymaker stabbed with a samurai sword. He enlists the assistance of Constance "Pink" Lately, a housewife clutching a Lady Baltimore cake, Jinx the red-headed Haymaker's elevator girl, and many of the participants in a "Victory Swap Meet" to track down an embezzler, a code thief and a murderer.

== Literary significance and criticism ==
(See Phoebe Atwood Taylor.) This is the sixth Leonidas Witherall mystery novel and it parallels the tone which was maintained in the other seven. A murder occurs under embarrassing circumstances, and Leonidas forms a motley crew of assistants together in order to track down clues, chase around the town, and solve the mystery. There is a strong vein of humor and the plot is fast-moving.

"The Adventures of Leonidas Witherall," was a short-lived radio series at about the time of this novel. In the novels, Witherall is also the author of a radio series and novels about the adventures of stalwart Lieutenant Hazeltine. Some supporting characters continue between novels; there is always a beautiful girl, a handsome former student, and an intrepid housewife.
