= List of United States post office murals in New Jersey =

Following is a list of United States post office murals created in New Jersey between 1934 and 1943.

Location	Mural title	Image	Artist	Date	Notes	NRHPlisted
Atlantic City	Family Recreation		Peppino Mangravite	1939		
Atlantic City	Youth		Peppino Mangravite	1939		
Bordentown	Skating on Bonaparte's Pond		Avery F. Johnson	1940	winner of the 48-State Mural Competition	
Cranford	The Battle of Cranford During the American Revolution		Gerald Foster	1937		
Fort Lee	Indians Trading with the Half Moon		Henry Schnakenberg	1941		
Fort Lee	Washington at Fort Lee		Henry Schnakenberg	1941		
Fort Lee	Moving Pictures at Fort Lee		Henry Schnakenberg	1941		
Fort Lee	The Present Day		Henry Schnakenberg	1941		
Freehold	Molly Pitcher		Gerald Foster	1935	Removed to the Monmouth County Public Library in Manalapan	
Garfield	Transportation of the Mail		Robert Laurent	1937		
Gloucester	The Perils of the Mail		Vincent D'Agostino	1937		
Glen Ridge			James Chapin	1938		
Kearny	The City		Albert Kotin	1938		
Kearny	The Marsh		Albert Kotin	1938		
Millburn	Revolutionary Engagement at Bridge in Millburn—1780		Gerald Foster	1940	destroyed	
Newark			Tanner Clark		on display at the Frank J. Lautenberg Post Office and Courthouse	
New Brunswick	George Washington with DeWitt, Geographer of the Revolutionary Army		George Biddle	1939		
New Brunswick	Howe and Cornwallis Entering New Brunswick		George Biddle	1939		
New Brunswick	Washington Retreating from New Brunswick		George Biddle	1939		
North Bergen	Purchase of Territory of North Bergen from the Indians		Avery F. Johnson	1942		
Nutley	Return of Annie Oakley		Paul C. Chapman	1941		
Plainfield	Folklore		Anton Refregier	1942	tempera	
Plainfield	Quilting Bee		Anton Refregier	1942	tempera	
Princeton	Columbia Under the Palm		Karl Free	1939		
Ridgefield	Washington Bridge		Thomas Donnelly	1937		
Riverside	Town of Progress – 1855		John Poeller	1940	oil on canvas	
South Orange	Outdoor Activities of South Orange		Bernard Perlin	1939		
Trenton Clarkson S. Fisher Federal Building and U.S. Courthouse	Progress of Industry		Charles W. Ward	1934	Public Works of Art Project; possibly the first New Deal post office mural	
Trenton Clarkson S. Fisher Federal Building and U.S. Courthouse	The Second Battle of Trenton		Charles W. Ward	1937	Treasury Relief Art Project	
Trenton Clarkson S. Fisher Federal Building and U.S. Courthouse	Rural Delivery		Charles W. Ward	1937	Treasury Relief Art Project	
Washington	A Raising in Early New Jersey		Frank Shapiro	1940		
Westfield	The New Stagecoach		Roy Hilton	1939		
Westfield	Building of Westfield		Roy Hilton	1939	destroyed during 1964 renovations	
West New York	View from the Palisades – West New York 1939		William Sean Fausett	1939		
Wildwood	Activities of the Fishing Fleet		Dennis Burlingame	1939	two panels	
