= The Cut Direct =

1938 novel by Phoebe Atwood Taylor

- First UK edition
- Author: Phoebe Atwood Taylor (writing as Alice Tilton)
- Language: English
- Series: Leonidas Witherall mysteries
- Genre: mystery, whodunnit
- Publisher: Norton (US); Collins (UK)
- Publication date: 1938
- Publication place: United States
- Media type: Print; hardcover and paperback
- OCLC: 30405116
- Preceded by: Beginning with a Bash
- Followed by: Cold Steal

The Cut Direct is a 1938 novel by American writer Phoebe Atwood Taylor using the pseudonym as Alice Tilton. It is the second of the eight Leonidas Witherall mystery series.

== Plot summary ==
It's a snowy day in Dalton (a New England town near Boston) and someone's trying to run over Leonidas Witherall, "the man who looks like Shakespeare". He's saved by brassy young Margie and her muscular boyfriend Cuff, but he promptly escapes them and is knocked down by another car. When he awakens, he's in the home of Bennington Brett, a former pupil, who is sitting stabbed in front of him. Witherall assembles a crew including the dead man's secretary, the lovely Miss Dallas Tring, two neighbors, Stanton Kaye, and dotty housewife Mrs. Price (who owns the fatal carving knife), whose new maid is Margie. Together, the group races around Dalton in pursuit of clues and suspects, comes dangerously close to the second murder, and resolves matters by delivering the criminals to the police complete with confessions.

== Literary significance and criticism ==
This is the second Leonidas Witherall mystery novel, and it parallels the tone which was maintained in the other seven. A murder occurs under embarrassing circumstances, and Leonidas forms a motley crew of assistants together in order to track down clues, chase around the town, and solve the mystery. There is a strong vein of humor and the plot is fast-moving.

The Adventures of Leonidas Witherall was a short-lived radio series featuring characters from the series.
