= The Hollow Chest =

1941 novel by Phoebe Atwood Taylor

- First edition (US)
- Author: Phoebe Atwood Taylor (writing as Alice Tilton)
- Language: English
- Series: Leonidas Witherall mysteries
- Genre: Mystery novel / Whodunnit
- Publisher: Norton (USA, 1941); Collins (UK, 1942)
- Publication place: United States
- Media type: Print; hardcover and paperback
- OCLC: 18941451
- Preceded by: The Left Leg
- Followed by: File For Record

The Hollow Chest is a novel that was published in 1941 by Phoebe Atwood Taylor writing as Alice Tilton. It is the fifth of the eight Leonidas Witherall mysteries.

== Plot summary ==
It's Egg Day in Dalton (a New England town near Boston) and Leonidas Witherall, "the man who looks like Shakespeare", returns home from shepherding some students on an Egg Day outing to find his house ransacked, his safe open, and a beautiful blonde bound and gagged on his bed. While he's distracted by the police, she escapes. Then a wealthy neighbor asks him to run an unusual errand, promising his school an endowment if he does so—in full evening dress, he meets the blonde on a Dalton corner and relieves her of a hollow chest that looks much heavier than it is. Moments later, he discovers a bludgeoned body in a nearby car. He enlists the assistance of plucky Luzzy Jenkins and oafish soldier Goldie to investigate, among other things, the affairs of Goldie's general, a horse named George, a blonde named George, a bank president and a young student named Threewit. Together they explain all the bizarre coincidences and solve the murder.

== Literary significance and criticism ==
(See Phoebe Atwood Taylor.) This is the fifth Leonidas Witherall mystery novel and it parallels the tone which was maintained in the other seven. A murder occurs under embarrassing circumstances, and Leonidas forms a motley crew of assistants together in order to track down clues, chase around the town, and solve the mystery. There is a strong vein of humor and the plot is fast-moving.

The adventures of Leonidas Witherall were a short-lived radio series at about the time of this novel. In the novels, Witherall is also the author of a radio series and novels about the adventures of stalwart Lieutenant Hazeltine. Some supporting characters continue between novels; there is always a beautiful girl, a handsome former student, and an intrepid housewife.
