= Deathblow Hill =

1935 novel by Phoebe Atwood Taylor

- First edition cover design
- Author: Phoebe Atwood Taylor
- Language: English
- Series: Asey Mayo
- Genre: Mystery, Detective novel
- Publisher: W. W. Norton & Company
- Publication date: 1935
- Publication place: United States
- Media type: Print (Hardback & Paperback)
- Pages: 285 pp (Foul Play Press paperback edition, 1993)
- ISBN: 0-88150-262-6 (Foul Play Press paperback edition, 1993)
- OCLC: 54256714
- Preceded by: The Tinkling Symbol (1935)
- Followed by: The Crimson Patch (1936)

Deathblow Hill, first published in 1935, is a detective story by Phoebe Atwood Taylor which features her series detective Asey Mayo, the "Codfish Sherlock"; it is the 6th book in Taylor's Cape Cod Mystery series. This novel is a mystery of the type known as a whodunnit.

== Plot summary ==
Between two neighboring Cape Cod houses there is a chain link fence topped with barbed wire to signify the feud between the two halves of the Howes family. The disappearance of the fortune left by ancestor Bellamy Howes has divided Suzanne from her eccentric relative Simon. The fence has kept them apart, but now there are mysterious things happening at both homes - unexplained ransackings, unexplained prowlers wearing yellow handkerchiefs, and two near stranglings. When wealthy Benjamin Carson is strangled and left on the doorstep of one of the two houses on Deathblow Hill, Asey Mayo is called in to set to right both little mysteries (such as Bellamy's ships-in-bottles collection) and large mysteries like a tidy murderer.
