= The Iron Clew =

1947 novel by Phoebe Atwood Taylor

The Iron Clew (aka The Iron Hand)
- First edition (US)
- Author: Phoebe Atwood Taylor (writing as Alice Tilton)
- Language: English
- Series: Leonidas Witherall mysteries
- Genre: Mystery novel / Whodunnit
- Publisher: Farrar Straus (US); Collins (UK) as The Iron Hand
- Publication date: 1947
- Publication place: United States
- Media type: Print; hardcover and paperback
- OCLC: 27224110
- LC Class: PS3539.A9635 I76 1992
- Preceded by: Dead Ernest

The Iron Clew is a novel that was published in 1947 by Phoebe Atwood Taylor writing as Alice Tilton. It is the eighth and last of the eight Leonidas Witherall mysteries.

== Plot summary ==
Leonidas Witherall, "the man who looks like Shakespeare", is writing the latest adventure of Lieutenant Hazeltine when his housekeeper Mrs. Mullet interrupts to offer her "candied opinion". He then prepares to leave for a dinner to which he's been invited in his persona as a bank director, held at the home of banker Fenwick Balderston, when he notices that a brown-paper parcel of bank papers has disappeared. Upon arrival at Balderston's, he finds the banker has been bashed with a bronze bust of Shakespeare. Assisted by plucky housewife Liz Copley and gang of other assistants, Witherall races around the town of Dalton and tracks down a missing dinosaur footprint, a copy of Tamerlane, the bank documents and the murderer.

== Reception ==
As with the previous novel in the series, the humour of the work was complemented. A review in the Sun Journal recommended the book, saying that "there was plenty of mystery, plenty of suspense, and best of all plenty of laughs."

== Legacy ==
The adventures of Leonidas Witherall were a short-lived radio series at about the time of this novel. In the novels, Witherall is also the author of a radio series and novels about the adventures of stalwart Lieutenant Hazeltine.
