= Octagon House (novel) =

1937 serialized American novel

Octagon House is a 1937 serialized novel by Phoebe Atwood Taylor that was distributed by the Associated Press and appeared in multiple newspapers in the United States.

== Plot ==
Octagon House tells the story of a New England town so scandalized by the offensive mural installed in their new post office that they paint over it. The novel focuses on government incompetence in general; a large and luxurious post office is built in a Cape Cod town with only 800 year-round residents. The mural, painted on the ceiling by Jack Lorne, a local painter who had stolen the commission through cronyism, is titled The History and Customs of Cape Cod. Asey Mayo, the protagonist, is called in to solve the murder of Lorne's wife Marina. Multiple local prominent citizens are "viciously caricatured" in the painting.

Reactions to the mural take center stage to the solving of the mystery, as the townspeople are aghast at what it depicts:

No living man could describe that mural, and if he could, no one would believe him...Peace, her wings protruding from beach pajamas, was starting a side chancery on a clam digger, who resented it vigorously. Ignoring three heavily armed apes in gas masks who belabored her from virtually every angle, Peace beamed down at a stalwart youth whose full nelson on Capital was definitely getting results...From the clam digger's left knee tottered a leering British Grenadier, and a priest hugging a mussed Red Cross nurse. Near her, two tired women stirred something steaming in a kettle. Out of the steam emerged a Model T Ford driven by a child...Myles Standish sat in a cramped position on the spare tire.

— Phoebe Atwood Taylor

Eventually postal staff misplace a key to the building and the mural is painted over after hours.

== Style ==
The novel was one of a series of Asey Mayo mysteries set in the fictional Cape Cod town of Quanomet; Karal Ann Marling calls the protagonist of the series a "plain-spoken rustic" and the villains various "suave tourists" outwitted by the common-sense hero. In Octagon House, Taylor uses Asey Mayo to comment on the vagaries of government-commissioned art.

== Cultural references ==
At the time the book was written, New Deal programs were funding murals in hundreds of post offices throughout the United States. Art historian Karal Ann Marling wrote:

Popular attitudes toward the mural renaissance were being formed and scandals over the repugnant stuff the government might smear on a wall erected with taxpayers' dollars were limited to breathless wire-service reports.

In 1937, after the unveiling of Dangers of the Mail, a post office mural that attracted widespread objections, Washington's Evening Star immediately called the mural "Art at its Worst", said it had "shocked all who have seen it", accused "government doles" of "foster[ing]...radicalism in art", and accompanied its review with a recounting of the plot of Octagon House.

== Popularity ==
The novel was serialized and distributed by the Associated Press and had, according to art historian Karal Ann Marling, "enjoyed a vast circulation".

== Reception ==
The New York Times said "it is the author's keen sense of humor that is the main attraction".

== See also ==
- Octagon house (eight-sided building fashionable in the 19th century)
