= Dilys Winn =

American bookseller (1939–2016)

Dilys Winn (1939–2016) was an American bookseller who was one of the first to open a bookstore devoted to mystery and detective fiction.

Dilys Barbara Winn was born in Dublin on September 8, 1939, and was brought to the United States one year later. She grew up in Perth Amboy, New Jersey, and graduated from Pembroke College. Winn worked as an advertising copywriter in the late 1960s and then opened her own bookstore, Murder Ink, located on the Upper West Side of Manhattan. In 1972, she appeared on the game show To Tell the Truth. In 1977, she published an anthology, Murder Ink, (Workman Publishers) which won an Edgar Award from the Mystery Writers Association of America. Like Otto Penzler, proprietor of the Mysterious Bookshop, Winn was a bookseller, editor, and anthologist who did much to develop a sense of tradition and self-consciousness in the genre while also giving access to its entertainment value and sense of fun. She was an advocate of the humorous, high-spirited work of Phoebe Atwood Taylor.

Winn transferred the proprietorship of the bookshop to Carol Brener in 1977. The bookshop continued, under various ownerships, until 2006. Winn lived for many years in New Paltz, NY. Winn continued to be active in the field as an editor, anthologist, and organizer. In the 1990s, she operated a mystery bookshop in Key West. After 2000, she moved to Asheville, North Carolina, where she died in 2016. The Dilys Award is named after her.
