= Beginning with a Bash =

1937 novel by Phoebe Atwood Taylor

Beginning With A Bash
- First edition (UK)
- Author: Phoebe Atwood Taylor (writing as Alice Tilton)
- Language: English
- Series: Leonidas Witherall mysteries
- Genre: Mystery / Whodunnit
- Publisher: Collins Crime Club (UK, 1937); Norton (US, 1972);
- Publication date: 1937
- Publication place: United States
- Media type: Print
- Followed by: The Cut Direct

Beginning With a Bash is a novel that was published in 1937 by Phoebe Atwood Taylor writing as Alice Tilton. It is the first of the Leonidas Witherall mysteries.

== Plot summary ==
It's a cold winter in Boston, and Peters's secondhand bookstore has a sign that says "Come in and browse -- it's warm inside". The sign attracts the attention of Martin Jones, who's not only chilly but being chased by the police because his former boss, Professor North, has accused him of stealing $50,000 from the Anthropology Society. Inside the bookstore, he meets a former teacher from his days at Meredith Academy; Leonidas Witherall, "the man who looks like Shakespeare", who had lost all his money in the stock market crash of 1929, and become the bookstore's janitor. The bookstore's new owner is a pretty young redhead of Jones's acquaintance. After the departure of a book thief and a car accident outside, Professor North's body is discovered in the religion section. Witherall and company—which soon includes a wealthy Boston dowager, North's sassy maid Gert, and Gert's mobster boyfriend Freddy—spend the evening tracking down clues to the murderer's identity and trying to stay out of the clutches of Freddy's rival gang. Under Witherall's supervision, the group solves the murder and forces a confession from the murderer just in time to save Jones from the police.

== Literary significance and criticism ==
(See Phoebe Atwood Taylor.) This is the first Leonidas Witherall mystery novel and it sets the tone which was continued in the other seven. A murder occurs under embarrassing circumstances, and Leonidas forms a motley crew of assistants together in order to track down clues, chase around the town, and solve the mystery. There is a strong vein of humor and the plot is fast-moving.

Mystery writer and critic H. R. F. Keating said: "This book is a splended example of marvellously brisk American writing ... [It] is more a how-will-he-get-out-of-it than a who-done-it. This, too, is a type of story that puts a premium on the sheer skill of the writing, and quick and wonderfully well-timed Alice Tilton's writing is. Yet she finds moments in the course of the whole hectic scramble for some instantly evocative descriptions of Boston's bone-chilling winter and ... for neat social comment."
