= The Left Leg =

1940 novel by Phoebe Atwood Taylor

- First edition (US)
- Author: Phoebe Atwood Taylor (writing as Alice Tilton)
- Language: English
- Series: Leonidas Witherall mysteries
- Genre: Mystery novel / Whodunnit
- Publisher: Norton (US, 1940); Collins (UK, 1941)
- Publication date: 1940
- Publication place: United States
- Media type: Print; hardcover and paperback
- OCLC: 19772168
- Preceded by: Cold Steal
- Followed by: The Hollow Chest

The Left Leg is a novel that was published in 1940 by Phoebe Atwood Taylor writing as Alice Tilton. It is the fourth of the eight Leonidas Witherall mysteries.

== Plot summary ==
It's a winter day in Dalton (a New England town near Boston) and Leonidas Witherall, "the man who looks like Shakespeare", is stepping off a bus after having been accused of bothering a beautiful young woman in a scarlet wimple (who promptly becomes known as the Scarlet Wimpernel). He takes refuge in a hardware store run by a former student, Lincoln Potter. Potter is inclined to be helpful, until the Wimpernel's purse is discovered in Witherall's pocket and Witherall is incautious enough to admit that he saw Potter's cash register being emptied by a man in a green satin suit carrying a small harp. He heads for the home of a former teaching colleague, Marcus Meredith, and finds him murdered—and missing his artificial left leg. Potter is enlisted by Witherall for help in solving the murder, along with intrepid housewife Topsey Beaton. Together they deceive an entire rummage sale, enlist the Scarlet Wimpernel to play a role, find the man in green satin, locate the left leg, and solve the murder.

== Reception ==
A review in The Baltimore Sun thought it was "Perfectly preposterous" and "perfectly uproarious". Will Cuppy, writing in the Star Tribune, called it the "funniest mystery in years".
