= The Crimson Patch =

1936 novel by Phoebe Atwood Taylor

- First edition
- Author: Phoebe Atwood Taylor
- Language: English
- Series: Asey Mayo
- Genre: Mystery, Detective novel
- Publisher: W.W. Norton & Company
- Publication date: 1936
- Publication place: United States
- Media type: Print (Hardback & Paperback)
- Pages: 239 pp (Foul Play Press paperback edition, 1986)
- ISBN: 0-88150-064-X (Foul Play Press paperback edition, 1986)
- OCLC: 14103048
- Preceded by: Deathblow Hill (1935)
- Followed by: Out of Order (1936)

The Crimson Patch, first published in 1936, is a whodunit detective novel by Phoebe Atwood Taylor which features her series detective Asey Mayo, the "Codfish Sherlock".

== Plot summary ==
Mr. Myles Witherall, retired New Englander, decides on a whim to take an inexpensive tourist bus to the little town of Skaket, and thereby gets involved in the movements of an escaped killer. Meanwhile, a young married couple of artistic antecedents find that Skaket's inhabitants have turned violently against them, just before they find the body of Rosalie Ray, radio personality, dead in her bed, murdered with a whale lance. It takes Asey Mayo's knowledge of Skaket mores, a session of bric-a-brac destruction with wilful ingenue Laurie Lee, and the breaking of a clever alibi before Asey can pinpoint the killer and administer justice personally.
