= The Mystery of the Cape Cod Tavern =

1934 novel by Phoebe Atwood Taylor

- Reprint edition
- Author: Phoebe Atwood Taylor
- Language: English
- Series: Asey Mayo
- Genre: Mystery, Detective novel
- Publisher: W.W. Norton & Co
- Publication date: 1934
- Publication place: United States
- Media type: Print (Hardback & Paperback)
- Pages: 283 pp
- OCLC: 12655032
- Preceded by: The Mystery of the Cape Cod Players (1933)
- Followed by: Sandbar Sinister (1934)

The Mystery of the Cape Cod Tavern, first published in 1934 by W. W. Norton & Co., is a detective story by Phoebe Atwood Taylor which features her series detective Asey Mayo, the "Codfish Sherlock". This novel is a mystery of the type known as a whodunnit.

== Plot summary ==
Eve Prence is the glamorous and publicity-seeking owner of the famous Cape Cod Tavern, and uses her publicity to keep the Tavern filled with famous and/or wealthy guests. She has a house-full the night she's found at the bottom of the grand staircase, claiming somebody had tried to kill her. The following day, she is found with a knife in her ribs. Asey Mayo must work out the meaning of clues like a pair of antique pistols that contain a pair of antique daggers, and what exactly the blind boy on the scene of the crime heard, and a pair of dirty indentations on a windowsill before bringing home the crime to a surprising figure.
