= The Tinkling Symbol =

1935 novel by Phoebe Atwood Taylor

- First edition
- Author: Phoebe Atwood Taylor
- Language: English
- Series: Asey Mayo
- Genre: Mystery, Detective novel
- Publisher: W. W. Norton & Company
- Publication date: 1935
- Publication place: USA
- Media type: Print (Hardback & Paperback)
- Pages: 288 pp
- OCLC: 28564135
- Dewey Decimal: 813/.52 20
- LC Class: PS3539.A9635 T56 1993
- Preceded by: Sandbar Sinister (1934)
- Followed by: Deathblow Hill (1935)

The Tinkling Symbol, first published in 1935, is a detective story by Phoebe Atwood Taylor which features her series detective Asey Mayo, the "Codfish Sherlock". This novel is a whodunnit mystery.

== Plot summary ==
The little Cape Cod town of West Weesit has been rocked by four suicides from the same location, now known as "Suicide Cliff". Kay Truman was the found at the foot of the cliff a month prior. Her father, Dave, had already been depressed because his business had failed and his wife had left him. When a number of witnesses in a neighboring house see him come out of his house and aim a gun at himself, they assume the resulting shot is another suicide. But when it is learned that Dave had in fact been stabbed in the back, Asey Mayo is called to investigate, soon becoming a target for a determined shooter. Meanwhile, he sorts out some local Cape Cod entanglements and learns the meaning of a dying clue left by Dave Truman— "ink"—and what the tinkling bell around the neck of Sully the cat has to do with anything.
