= Out of Order (novel) =

1936 novel by Phoebe Atwood Taylor

- First edition
- Author: Phoebe Atwood Taylor
- Language: English
- Series: Asey Mayo
- Genre: Mystery, Detective novel
- Publisher: W. W. Norton & Company
- Publication date: 1936
- Publication place: United States
- Media type: Print (Hardback & Paperback)
- Pages: 280 pp
- OCLC: 18274312
- Preceded by: The Crimson Patch (1936)
- Followed by: Figure Away (1937)

Out of Order, first published in 1936, is a detective story by Phoebe Atwood Taylor which features her series detective Asey Mayo, the "Codfish Sherlock". This novel is a mystery of the type known as a whodunnit.

== Plot summary ==
Cape Cod's resident detective Asey Mayo has a long history with millionaire Bill Porter, owner of Potter Motors. Bill's men's club, the Hybrid, has a long history of funny bets on the night of the big football game, but when Bill Porter's enemy Harper Dixon bets Bill $50,000 that Asey Mayo couldn't "solve his Aunt Eugenia's grocery order", Asey must take a hand on behalf of his old friend, and returns from Jamaica to a New England blizzard. While approaching the Dixon home, he collects an assorted gang of characters and takes them to the Dixons' for safety. After they arrive, the group is locked in a powder room by a mysterious figure with a bright-red manicure. Upon their release, they discover Aunt Charlotte Dixon, drowned in her washbasin while in the process of shampooing her hair. When Asey Mayo learns that Aunt Eugenia's grocery order is the last thing she wrote before her death, he realizes that there is more at stake here than a bet.
