= Sandbar Sinister =

1934 novel by Phoebe Atwood Taylor

- First edition
- Author: Phoebe Atwood Taylor
- Language: English
- Series: Asey Mayo
- Genre: Mystery, Detective novel
- Publisher: W. W. Norton & Company
- Publication date: 1934
- Publication place: USA
- Media type: Print (Hardback & Paperback)
- Pages: 294
- Preceded by: The Mystery of the Cape Cod Tavern (1934)
- Followed by: The Tinkling Symbol (1935)

Sandbar Sinister, first published in 1934, is a detective story by Phoebe Atwood Taylor which features her series detective Asey Mayo, the "Codfish Sherlock". This novel is a mystery of the type known as a whodunnit.

== Plot summary ==
The picturesque village of East Pochet in Cape Cod is not its usual self when Elizabeth Colton drives into it; the previous evening, a bootlegger dumped two hundred cases of liquor offshore, and the whole town reaped the windfall. At some point during the boozy celebrations, however, a bearded mystery writer ended up dead in the boat house at the Sandbar estate. Asey Mayo must figure out the comings and goings of a number of interested parties before he puts together the meaning of a mysterious fire in the living room and a tube of salve and solves the crime.
