= Murder at the New York World's Fair =

1938 novel by Phoebe Atwood Taylor

- First edition
- Author: Phoebe Atwood Taylor (writing as Freeman Dana)
- Language: English
- Genre: Mystery novel / Whodunnit
- Publisher: Random House
- Publication date: 1938
- Publication place: United States
- Media type: Print; hardcover and paperback
- OCLC: 15485682
- Dewey Decimal: 813/.52 19
- LC Class: PS3539.A9635 M8 1987

Murder at the New York World's Fair is a novel that was published in 1938 by Phoebe Atwood Taylor writing as Freeman Dana. It is the only mystery she wrote under that name.

== Plot summary ==
Mrs. Daisy Tower is 67, the widow of a former governor, and for the last year has undergone the untender attentions of her nephew Egleston and his overbearing wife Elfrida during her convalescence from pneumonia and a broken hip. That might explain why she stows away in a laundry truck headed for Boston, but it doesn't really explain how she finds herself confronting a dead body aboard the private train of art collector Conrad Cassell, en route to the New York World's Fair. She and her fellow passengers find themselves in a screwball comedy fix, set against the pageantry of opening day under the shadow of the Fair's spectacular trylon. Daisy must not only identify the corpse and the murderer, but save the Fair from destruction by a maniac—and find a way to get Egleston and Elfrida out of her hair.

== Literary significance and criticism ==
(See Phoebe Atwood Taylor.) Bennett Cerf, publisher of Random House, commissioned Phoebe Atwood Taylor to write this mystery as part of the festivities surrounding the 1938 New York World's Fair. "Westinghouse decided to inter a time capsule in its pavillon courtyard, and Mr. Cerf decided that among the 10,000,000 words going down in it on September 23, 1938, 60,000 or so would belong to one of his authors, namely, Phoebe Atwood Taylor."
