= The Cape Cod Mystery =

1931 novel by Phoebe Atwood Taylor

- First edition
- Author: Phoebe Atwood Taylor
- Language: English
- Series: Asey Mayo
- Genre: Mystery, Detective novel
- Publisher: Bobbs-Merrill
- Publication date: 1931
- Publication place: USA
- Media type: Print (Hardback & Paperback)
- Pages: 189 pp (Pyramid paperback edition, 1985)
- Followed by: Death Lights a Candle (1932)

The Cape Cod Mystery, first published in 1931, is a detective story by Phoebe Atwood Taylor, the first to feature her series detective Asey Mayo, the "Codfish Sherlock". This novel is a mystery of the type known as a whodunnit.

According to The New York Times, "Phoebe Atwood Taylor can get more fun into a detective story than any writer at present producing, and with all the fun there is a mystery that is baffling for its own sake."

== Plot summary ==
Dale Sanborn has made a lot of enemies in his career as a muckraking author, philanderer and occasional blackmailer. When he vacations at a cabin in Cape Cod, any of his many visitors—an old girl friend, his fiancée, an outraged husband, a long-lost brother and a few more—the night he died could have killed him, and all of them wanted to. When a Boston matron is involved in the crime, local character Asey Mayo takes a hand and brings the case to an unexpected conclusion.

Storytel summarized the book as such: "When a famous author turns up dead, it's up to Asey Mayo to find the killer."
