= Cold Steal =

1939 novel by Phoebe Atwood Taylor

- First edition (US)
- Author: Phoebe Atwood Taylor (writing as Alice Tilton)
- Language: English
- Series: Leonidas Witherall mysteries
- Genre: Mystery, whodunnit
- Publisher: Norton (US, 1939); Collins (UK, 1940)
- Publication date: 1939
- Publication place: United States
- Media type: Print (hardback & paperback)
- OCLC: 31943269
- Preceded by: The Cut Direct
- Followed by: The Left Leg

Cold Steal is a novel that was published in 1939 by Phoebe Atwood Taylor writing as Alice Tilton. It is the third of the eight Leonidas Witherall mysteries.

== Plot summary ==
It's a winter day in Dalton (a New England town near Boston) and Leonidas Witherall, "the man who looks like Shakespeare", is returning to his new house, which he's never seen. He's inherited money from an uncle and toured the world, and left plans for his home to be built while on his travels, but now he must return home and produce the next volume of the adventures of Lieutenant Haseltine. On the train to Dalton, he meets a mousy woman named Miss Chard (known to all as Swiss Chard) and a beautiful young woman with a brown paper package and a secret. His new home proves a delight, and it includes a kitchen filled with red appliances, a library with ladders, and a garage complete with the pickaxed corpse of Medora, the crabby next-door neighbor. Leonidas assembles a gang of assistants, including dotty housewife Cassie Price and former car thief Cuff (who has reformed and joined the police force). Together, they defend Witherall's new red refrigerator against thieves, track down the missing envelope of money and bring the murderer to justice.

== Literary significance and criticism ==
(See Phoebe Atwood Taylor.) This is the third Leonidas Witherall mystery novel and it parallels the humorous tone which was maintained in the other seven.

The adventures of Leonidas Witherall were a short-lived radio series at about the time of this novel. In the novels, Witherall is also the author of a radio series and novels about the adventures of stalwart Lieutenant Hazeltine. Some supporting characters, such as Mrs. Price and Sergeant Cuff from this novel, are found in others as well.
