= Frank Mechau =

American painter

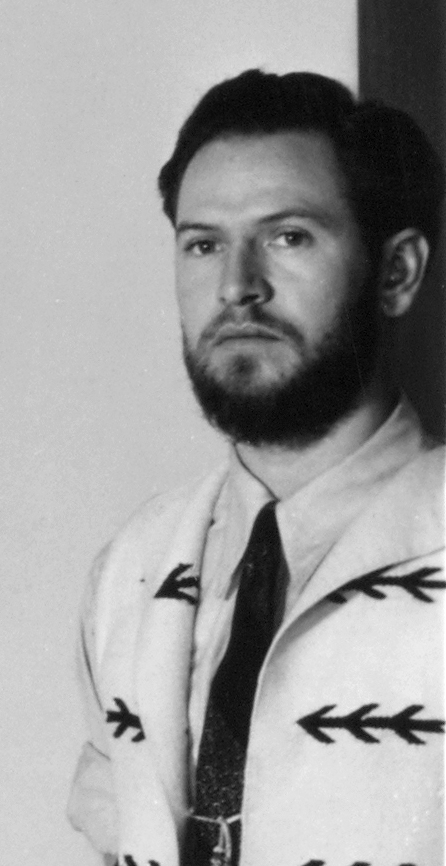
Frank Mechau in 1937

Frank Albert Mechau Jr. (January 1904–1946) was an American artist and muralist. His work has been featured in many national and international exhibitions. Many of his paintings are currently in private collections and museums around the U.S., and his murals are on the walls of public buildings in Colorado, Nebraska, Texas, and Washington, D.C.

== Early life ==
Mechau's grandfather August emigrated from Mechau, Germany, via New Orleans, eventually settling in Missouri. He married Helena Breuer and the couple moved to Brown County, Kansas, where they had seven children, including Mechau's father Frank Albert (b. 1874).

Mechau was born January 1904 in Wakeeney, Kansas, to Frank Albert Mechau and Alice Livingston Mechau, who married in 1892. The family moved to Glenwood Springs, Colorado, when Mechau was a young boy. He was one of four children of the couple. Mechau Senior operated a livery yard.

Mechau studied at the University of Denver and the Art Institute of Chicago. While at the Art Institute, he worked at Marshall Field's in the book department. He spent time studying in New York and in 1929 moved with his wife, Paula, to Europe to study there.

== Artistic career ==
In 1931 five works by Mechau were exhibited in the Parc des Expositions exhibit Les Surindependents.

== Murals ==
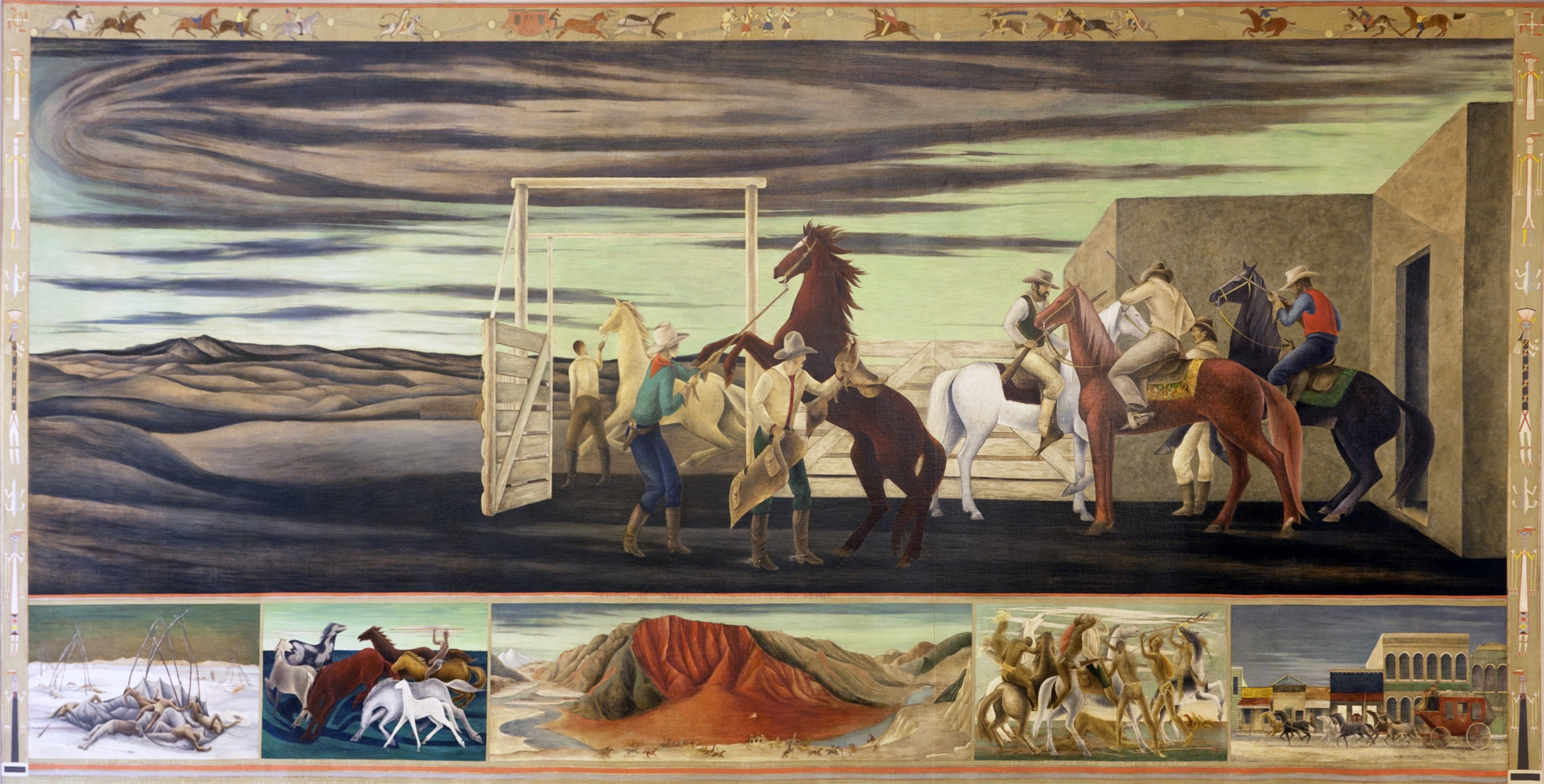
Pony Express (1937), commissioned by the Section of Painting and Sculpture for the Post Office Department Building in Washington, D.C.

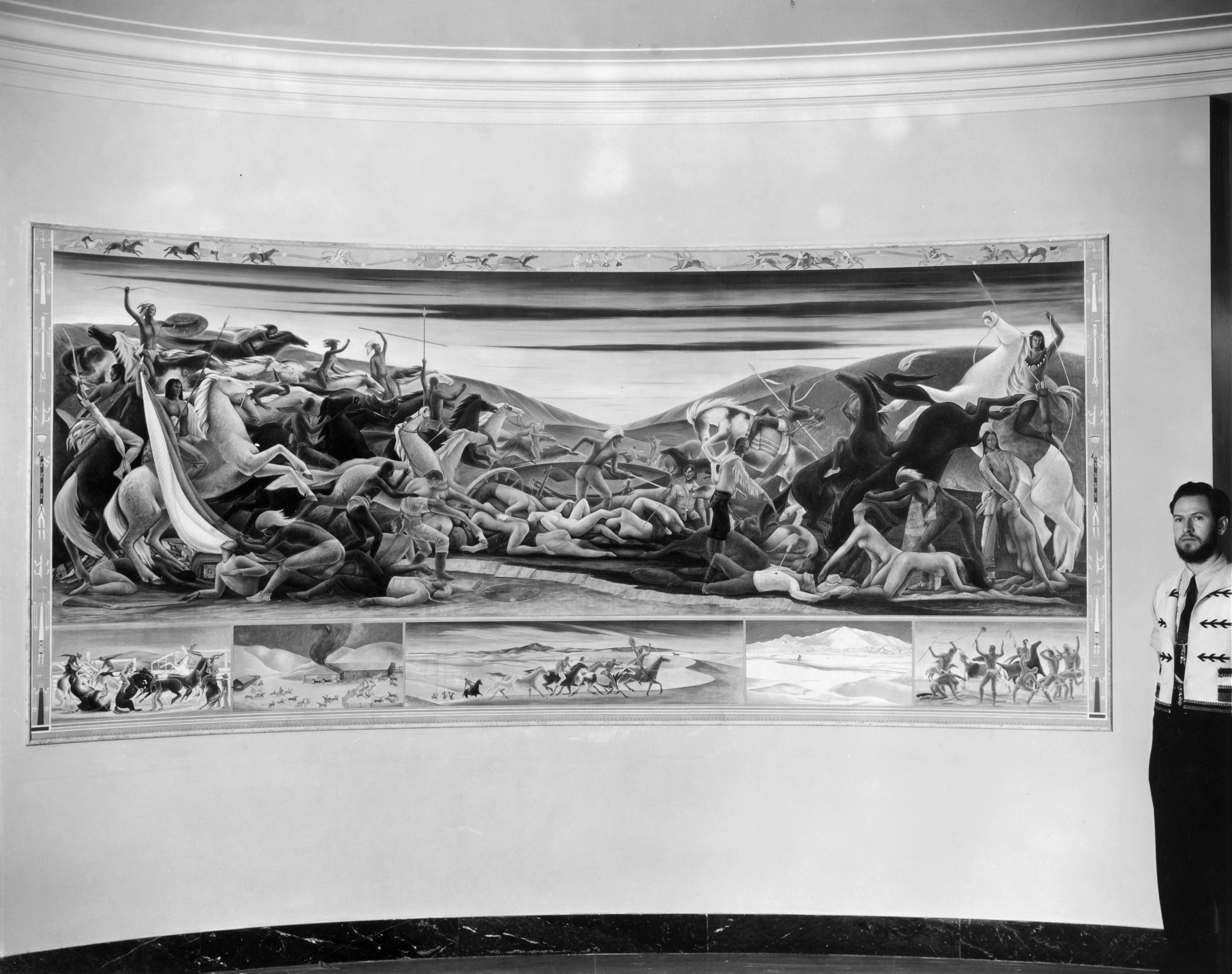
Mechau with Dangers of the Mail, after the mural's 1937 installation at the Post Office Department Building in Washington, D.C.

Between 1934 and 1940, Mechau was awarded 11 mural commissions through New Deal art projects. Horses at Night was followed in 1935 by two Mechau murals that were selected for placement in the new Post Office Department Building designed to incorporate large works of art. Each of the competition winners created a pair of murals. Mechau's depicted aspects of mail delivery during years of U.S. westward expansion. Pony Express features riders and their horses at a checkpoint along the Pony Express route.

Dangers of the Mail portrays the ambush and violent attack by Native Americans on a mail stagecoach and its occupants. Researcher Jessy Ohl describes the main painting as showing three "naked white women (being) scalped in a sexually explicit manner" in the bottom right hand of the painting, where they are shown kneeling and bent awkwardly toward the sky and ground by three Native Americans. The Washington Post in 2000 reported a critic saying of the scene, "That so much plays into the stereotype of the sexually violent savage. He's going to either rape her or scalp her or both". Art historian Karal Ann Marling describes the figures of the women as "clearly female, to be sure, thanks to volumetric mass". The mural received widespread objections at the time for historical inaccuracy and government-funded lewdness and renewed objections in the 2000s for creating a hostile work environment for employees of the Environmental Protection Agency, which had made the building its headquarters. The Government Services Agency eventually blocked the mural from view.

Fighting a Prairie Fire, also completed in 1938, was commissioned for the post office in Brownfield, Texas—now sheltered at the Brownfield Police Station. A historical marker has been placed in front of the building.

Mechau's last New Deal murals were three oil-on-canvas panels commissioned for the Eldon B. Mahon United States Courthouse building located in Fort Worth, Texas. The Taking of Sam Bass, Two Texas Rangers, and Flags Over Texas were the only New Deal art commissions sponsored in Fort Worth.

=== Ogallala Post Office Mural ===
Mechau painted a mural for the Ogallala, Nebraska, post office, entitled Long Horns. This scene shows longhorn cattle being herded across the plains, and the foreground of the scene is dominated by the livestock. There is a figure riding a horse in front of some of the cattle, herding them, and farther into the distance the landscape starts to fade out, though hills can still be seen. This cattle herding scene was the subject of a previous mural Mechau made for an entry in the Dallas post office competition, but it was unsuccessful, and because he was attached to the concept due to his fascination with the American West, he opted to use it in the Ogallala mural instead.

== Personal life ==
Mechau married Paula Ralska, who at the time worked in the advertising department of Lord & Taylor. The couple lived in Greenwich Village before moving to Europe in 1929. In 1930 they were living in Montrouge. The couple had four children.
