= Dead Ernest (novel) =

1944 novel by Phoebe Atwood Taylor

- First edition (US)
- Author: Phoebe Atwood Taylor (writing as Alice Tilton)
- Language: English
- Series: Leonidas Witherall mysteries
- Genre: Mystery novel / Whodunnit
- Publisher: Norton (US); Collins (UK, 1945)
- Publication date: 1944
- Publication place: United States
- Media type: Print; hardcover and paperback
- OCLC: 27109050
- Dewey Decimal: 813/.52 20
- LC Class: PS3539.A9635 D35 1992
- Followed by: The Iron Clew

Dead Ernest is a novel that was published in 1944 by Phoebe Atwood Taylor writing as Alice Tilton. It is the seventh of the eight Leonidas Witherall mysteries.

== Plot summary ==
Leonidas Witherall, "the man who looks like Shakespeare", is writing the final words of the latest adventure of Lieutenant Hazeltine when his housekeeper Mrs. Mullet interrupts to offer her "candied opinion". The next interruption is two men who deliver an unwanted deep freeze and leave, followed by a blonde in an evening gown and an orchid corsage who mistakenly serenades him with "Happy Birthday". The deep freeze proves to contain the dead body of Ernest Finger, the French teacher at Meredith's Academy, which Witherall has recently inherited. Witherall musters an unlikely gang of associates, including Sonia Mullet, her boyfriend and half the Finger family, to trace the trail of the moving Finger corpse and identify the murderer.

== Literary significance and criticism ==
This is the seventh Leonidas Witherall mystery novel and it parallels the tone which was maintained in the other seven. A murder occurs under embarrassing circumstances, and Leonidas forms a motley crew of assistants together in order to track down clues, chase around the town, and solve the mystery. There is a strong vein of humor and the plot is fast-moving.

The adventures of Leonidas Witherall were a short-lived radio series at about the time of this novel. In the novels, Witherall is also the author of a radio series and novels about the adventures of stalwart Lieutenant Hazeltine. Some supporting characters continue between novels; there is always a beautiful girl, a handsome former student, and an intrepid housewife.
