= Phoebe Atwood Taylor =

American writer

Phoebe Atwood Taylor (18 May 1909 – 9 January 1976) was an American writer of mystery novels, who was born and died in Boston. She graduated from Barnard College in 1930 and married surgeon Grantley Walder Taylor in December 1951.

Phoebe Atwood Taylor wrote mystery novels under her own name, and as Freeman Dana and Alice Tilton. Her first novel, The Cape Cod Mystery, introduced the "Codfish Sherlock", Asey Mayo, who became a series character appearing in 24 novels. According to critic Dilys Winn, "Mrs. Taylor is the mystery equivalent to Buster Keaton." She borrowed heavily on her own background (being born in Boston, and very familiar with Cape Cod) to produce books full of local color. "As a whole the Asey Mayo books are a treasure trove of humor and local culture of the Cape in the 1930s and '40s." Taylor adopted the pseudonyms of Freeman Dana and Alice Tilton for her other books because her publisher did not want her known as a writer of potboilers. Like many who lived through the Great Depression, she was in constant need of money, and one of her letters to her publisher was printed in a recent edition of one of her books as an explanation of why she adopted the pen name of Alice Tilton for the popular Leonidas Witherall novel series.

== Asey Mayo ==
Asey (a nickname for his given name, Asa) Mayo is a down-to-earth Cape Cod resident who has had numerous adventures around the world during his former sailing career, but now works as a kind of general assistant to the heir to "Porter Motors." He has an immense amount of knowledge of local geography and the doings of the inhabitants of Cape Cod, and uses his knowledge, his physical stamina, his very fast car and a great deal of intelligence to solve local murders at breakneck speed. His cousin Jennie Mayo, a repository of local gossip, plays a role in many of the novels, and her husband Syl often assists Asey. Jennie's charitable and civic activities in the community often provide the starting point for Asey's cases, but another constant theme is the interference of "folks from away" in local affairs.

The earliest Asey Mayo titles are rather dark, perhaps reflecting the Depression background. As the series went on, the tone lightened and approached the screwball towards the end of the series. All the books have a strong sense of the Cape Cod background, and many have a strong sense of time as well. In the novels written during World War II, for example, Mayo is hindered by fuel and rubber rationing, military maneuvers, Fifth column activity, civilian defense groups, blackouts and First Aid training.

== Leonidas Witherall ==
Leonidas Witherall ("the man who looks like Shakespeare"), once an instructor at a private boys' school, has lost all of his money due to the Wall Street crash of 1929, and takes to anonymously writing books and, later, a radio show about the adventures of "Lieutenant Hazeltine" as a means of survival, while solving murders as a sideline. In the eight novels chronicling his adventures, Witherall is confronted with a corpse under unusual and maximally embarrassing circumstances that suggest his own guilt, requiring him to enlist a motley crew of assistants, use disguise and impersonation to escape discovery, and engage in at least one scavenger-hunt-like chase before solving the crime. Once in every novel, Witherall references the radio program's constant repetition of "Cannae"—an ancient battle from which Hazeltine draws inspiration so that his smaller force defeats his larger mass of enemies. This mention of Cannae means that Witherall is about to marshal his assistants as part of a clever scheme to deliver the murderer to justice. Hazeltine is also subject to the machinations of the "octopus of fate", by which an incredible coincidence is explained at least once in every Witherall novel. In 1944, the character was adapted into a Mutual radio mystery program, The Adventures of Leonidas Witherall.

Mystery critic Dilys Winn had this to say about the Witherall novels: "These books don't make all that much sense, but they go a long way in proving that making sense is immaterial – a guffaw is more vital. Tilton books are so busy, so complicated, so Marx Brothers ... that makes them sound as if they might have a plot, doesn't it? Bad assumption. They drift from incident to incident with the style of the crash 'em cars at a carnival." Mystery writer and critic H. R. F. Keating wrote, in an introduction to a 1987 reissue of the first Witherall novel, "If a writer can keep in play an interest in a crime of some sort, preferably indeed murder, and at the same time induce the reader to take the hither-and-thither balloon flight of farce, then the entertainment provided will be not doubled but tripled. But it is difficult. I suspect that the only recipe for success is sheer deftness in writing, coupled perhaps with establishing a firm basis in fact before the hilarious fantasy is allowed to take off. Both these elements Alice Tilton has at her disposal."

== The Crime Club ==
Taylor's 'Alice Tilton' books were published in the United Kingdom in the Collins Crime Club series; most of the Asey Mayo stories were as well.

== Bibliography ==
=== Asey Mayo novels and novellas ===
- The Cape Cod Mystery, 1931
- Death Lights a Candle, 1932
- The Mystery of the Cape Cod Players, 1933
- The Mystery of the Cape Cod Tavern, 1934
- Sandbar Sinister, 1934
- The Tinkling Symbol, 1935
- Deathblow Hill, 1935
- The Crimson Patch, 1936
- Out of Order, 1936
- Figure Away, 1937. Serialised in US newspapers as ‘’The Old Home Week Murder’’
- Octagon House, 1937
- The Annulet of Gilt, 1938
- Banbury Bog, 1938
- Spring Harrowing, 1939
- The Criminal C.O.D., 1940
- The Deadly Sunshade, 1940
- The Perennial Boarder, 1941. Serialised in US newspapers as ‘’The Phone Booth Murder’’.
- The Six Iron Spiders, 1942
- Three Plots for Asey Mayo, 1942. Three novellas from The American Magazine: "The Wander Bird Plot" (1939); "The Headacre Plot" (1941); "The Swan Boat Plot" (1942)
- Going, Going, Gone, 1943
- Proof of the Pudding, 1945
- The Asey Mayo Trio, 1946. Three novellas from The American Magazine: "The Stars Spell Death" (1943); "The Third Murderer" (1945); "Murder Rides the Gale" (1944)
- Punch with Care, 1946
- Diplomatic Corpse, 1951

=== Writing as Freeman Dana ===
- Murder at the New York World's Fair, 1938

=== Writing as Alice Tilton ===
All feature Leonidas Witherall.

- Beginning with a Bash, 1937 (Originally published as "The Riddle of Volume Four" by Phoebe Atwood Taylor in Mystery League, November 1933)
- The Cut Direct, 1938
- Cold Steal, 1939
- The Left Leg, 1940
- The Hollow Chest, 1941
- File For Record, 1943
- Dead Ernest, 1944
- The Iron Clew, 1947
