= The Adventures of Leonidas Witherall =

American radio mystery series (1944–1945)

The Adventures of Leonidas Witherall is a radio mystery series broadcast on Mutual from June 4, 1944, through May 6, 1945.

Based on the novels of Phoebe Atwood Taylor (writing as Alice Tilton), the 30-minute dramas were produced by Roger Bower and starred Walter Hampden as Leonidas Witherall, a British professor of criminology at the Meredith School for Boys in Dalton, Massachusetts, a fictional Boston suburb. Witherall, who resembled William Shakespeare, is an amateur detective and the accomplished author of the "popular Lieutenant Hazeltine stories."

His housekeeper Mrs. Mollett, who in the novels is constantly offering her "candied opinion", was played first by Ethel Remey and then Agnes Moorehead, and Jack MacBryde appeared as Police Sgt. McCloud. The announcer was Carl Caruso. Milton Kane supplied the music.

The program was heard on Sundays in "various evening timeslots".

== Listen to ==
- http://oldtimeradiolover.com/the-adventures-of-leonidas-witherall/
