= Alfred D. Crimi =

20th-century Italian-American painter

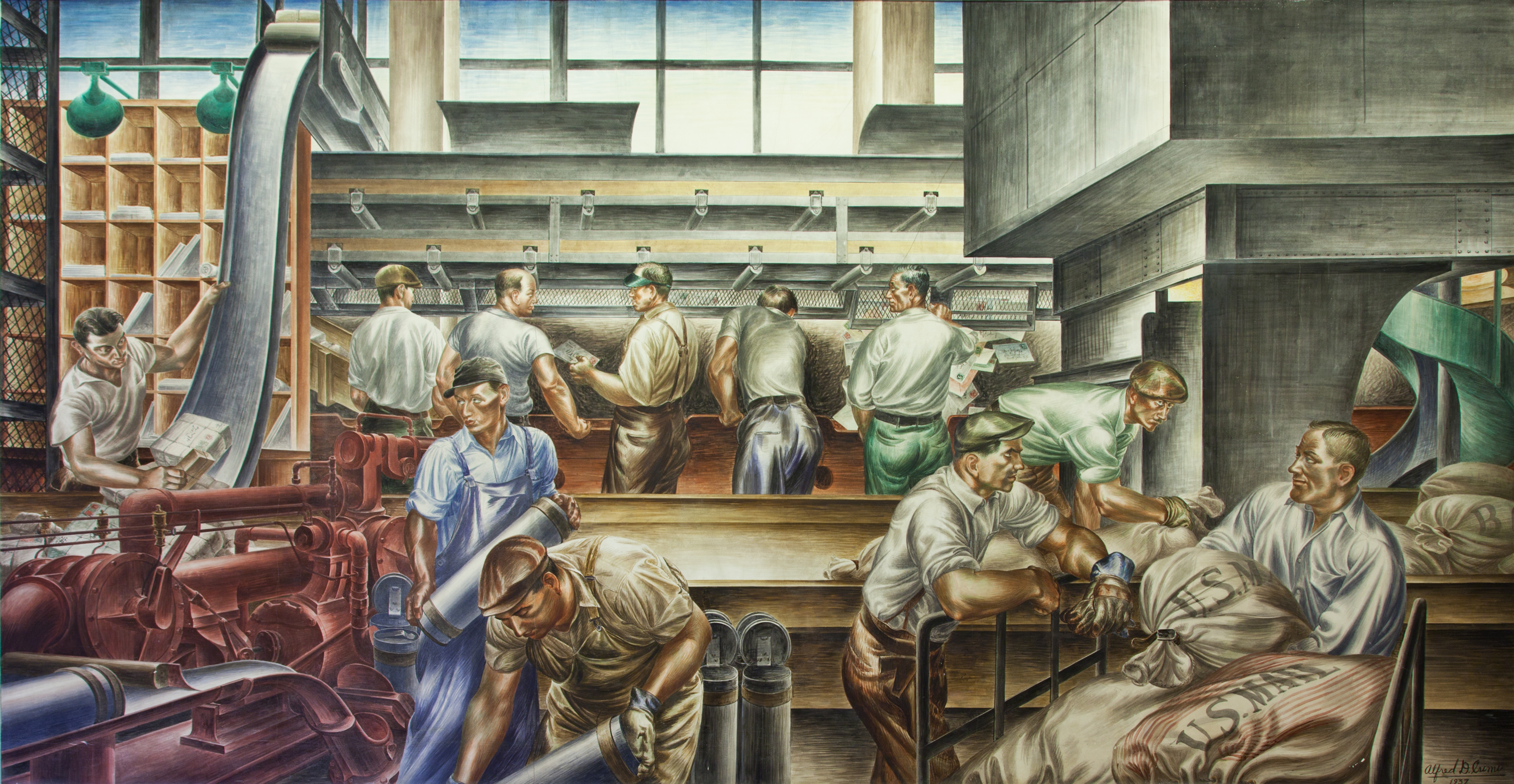
"Post Office work room" by Alfred Crimi, 1937

Alfred D. Crimi, also known as Alfredo Crimi, (San Fratello, Italy 1900–New York City 1994), was an Italian-American painter.

== Early life and education ==
Crimi was born in San Fratello, Sicily, on December 1, 1900. He emigrated to the United States in 1910 and became a US citizen in 1924. He attended the National Academy of Design in New York from 1916 to 1924, and the Beaux-Arts Institute of Design in New York from 1920 to 1921. In 1929, he went to Italy to study fresco and encaustic painting.

== Career ==
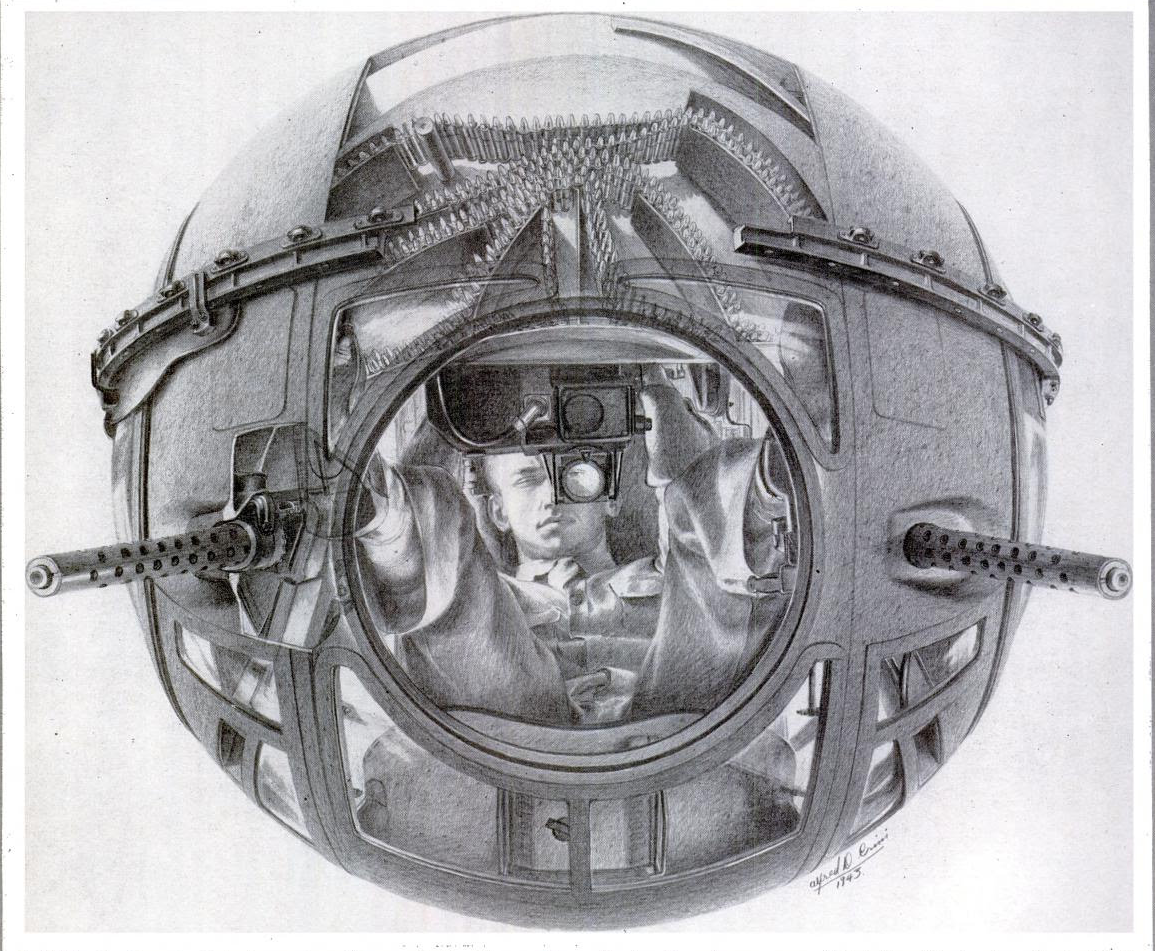
Crimi illustration at Sperry Gyroscope for the U.S.Army, 1943

During World War II, Crimi went to work for Sperry Gyroscope making drawings of weapons and instruments for military training manuals.

After the war, Crimi worked as a painter and watercolorist. His style evolved into abstractionism, including his painting "Metropolis", which "uses rectangular and abstract geometrical forms to represent a modern city." He held numerous shows and was credited with having nine solo shows by 1963 when Francis Quirk organized an exhibit at Lehigh University.

Crimi painted a number of murals. Notably, he was hired by the Federal Art Project of the Works Progress Administration (WPA) for the Harlem Hospitals murals project. He also worked for the Public Works of Art Project in Key West, Florida.

Significant murals include:

- Hampshire County Courthouse mural, Northampton, Massachusetts (1940)
- Harlem Hospital, New York NY (1940)
- Post Office Mural, Wayne, Pennsylvania (1941)
- Clinton Federal Building, Washington DC (1937)

== Awards and exhibitions ==
- 1923 Louis Comfort Tiffany Foundation Fellowship
- 1931 Portland Museum, Oregon
- 1932 De Young Museum, San Francisco
- 1956 Emily Lowe Prize
- 1962 Holyoke Museum
- 1963 Lehigh University Art Galleries
- 1966 Fordham University
- 1971 Ringwood Manor Museum
- Ulrich Museum, Wichita State University

== Collections ==
- Butler Museum of American Art, Youngstown, Ohio
- Brush Art Gallery, St. Lawrence University
- Chrysler Museum, Norfolk, Virginia
- Columbia Museum, South Carolina
- Evansvilee Museum of Arts and Science, Evansville, Indiana
- Forbes Library Collection, Northhampton, Massachusetts
- Holyoke Museum, Massachusetts
- Museum of the City of New York
- Magoichire Chatani - Pres Yamatene International Inc., Tokyo, Japan
- Museum of Fine Arts, Springfield, Massachusetts
- Wisteriahurst Museum
- Ulrich Museum, Wichita State University
- Portland Museum of Art, Portland, Oregon
- Rose Art Museum, Brandeis University, Waltham, Massachusetts
- Slater Memorial Museum, Norwich Academy, Norwich, Connecticut
- Smithsonian American Art Museum
- Springfield Art Museum, Springfield, Missouri
- University of Syracuse
- University of Maryland
- Wichita State University Museum, Kansas
- Whitney Museum of American Art
