= Karal Ann Marling =

American cultural historian (1943–2026)

Karal Ann Marling (November 5, 1943 – September 18, 2026) was an American cultural historian and writer. A professor emerita of the University of Minnesota, she was an American studies scholar with a special focus on the visual arts. The New York Times described her as a "keen-eyed critic of American popular culture." One book reviewer described her as a stylistic and intellectual heir to both Erma Bombeck and Tom Wolfe.

Originally from the East Coast, she earned a Ph.D. at Bryn Mawr College before she came to Minnesota in 1977 to teach. She became an acknowledged expert on her adopted home state, including on the cultural significance of state fairs (including the Minnesota State Fair) and shopping malls (including the Mall of America).

Over the course of her career, Marling wrote 19 full-length non-fiction books. She died on September 18, 2026, at the age of 82.

== Selected works ==
- Wall-to-wall America: a cultural history of post-office murals in the Great Depression
- Designing Disney's theme parks: the architecture of reassurance
- Designs on the heart: the homemade art of Grandma Moses
- Graceland: going home with Elvis
- As Seen on TV: The Visual Culture of Everyday Life in the 1950s
- Merry Christmas: Celebrating America's greatest holiday
- Debutante: rites and regalia of American debdom
- Norman Rockwell (1894-1978): America's most beloved painter
- Ice: great moments in the history of hard, cold water
- Minnesota, hail to thee!: a sesquicentennial history
- Blue Ribbon: A Social and Pictorial History of the Minnesota State Fair
