= William C. Palmer =

American painter

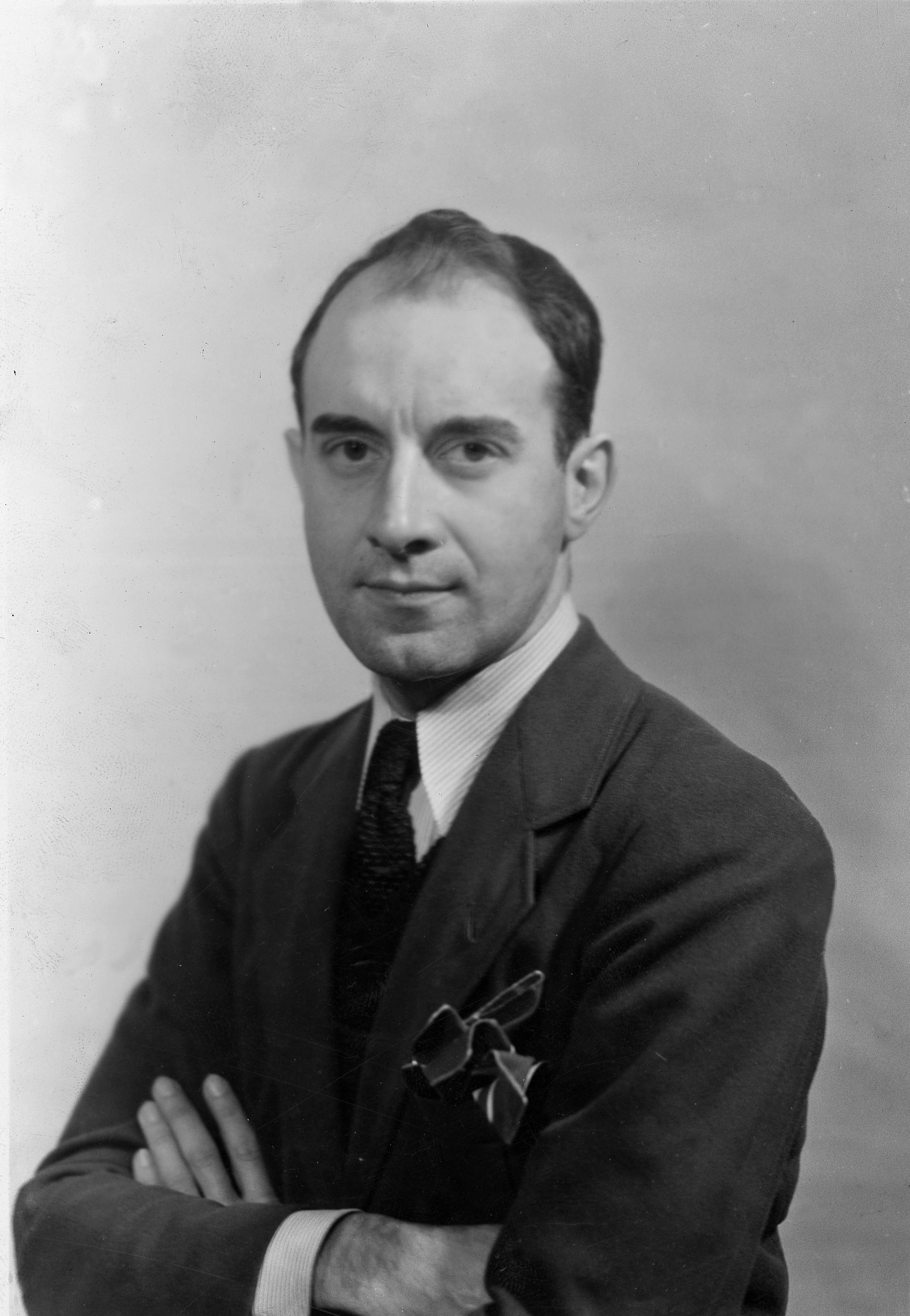
- Palmer in April 1937
- Born: 1906; Des Moines, Iowa
- Died: 1987 (aged 80–81); New York
- Known for: murals
- Spouse: Catherine Wechsler.

William C. Palmer (1906–1987) was an American painter who created public murals.

== Biography ==
William Charles Palmer was born in 1906, in Des Moines, Iowa. He studied at the Art Students League under Boardman Robinson, Thomas Hart Benton, and Kenneth Hayes Miller, and studied fresco painting at the Ecole des Beaux-Arts, Fontainebleau, France. During the depression he was taken on at 24 dollars a week to paint murals funded by the Public Works of Art Project. He was a member of the American Society of Painters, Sculptors and Gravers, and the Audubon Society. He was also a vice-president of the National Society of Mural Painters. He was director emeritus of the Munson-Williams-Proctor Arts Institute in Utica, New York.

Palmer retired in 1971 from the Utica school which he had founded thirty years before. He died at his home in 1987 in Clinton, New York.

== Paintings ==
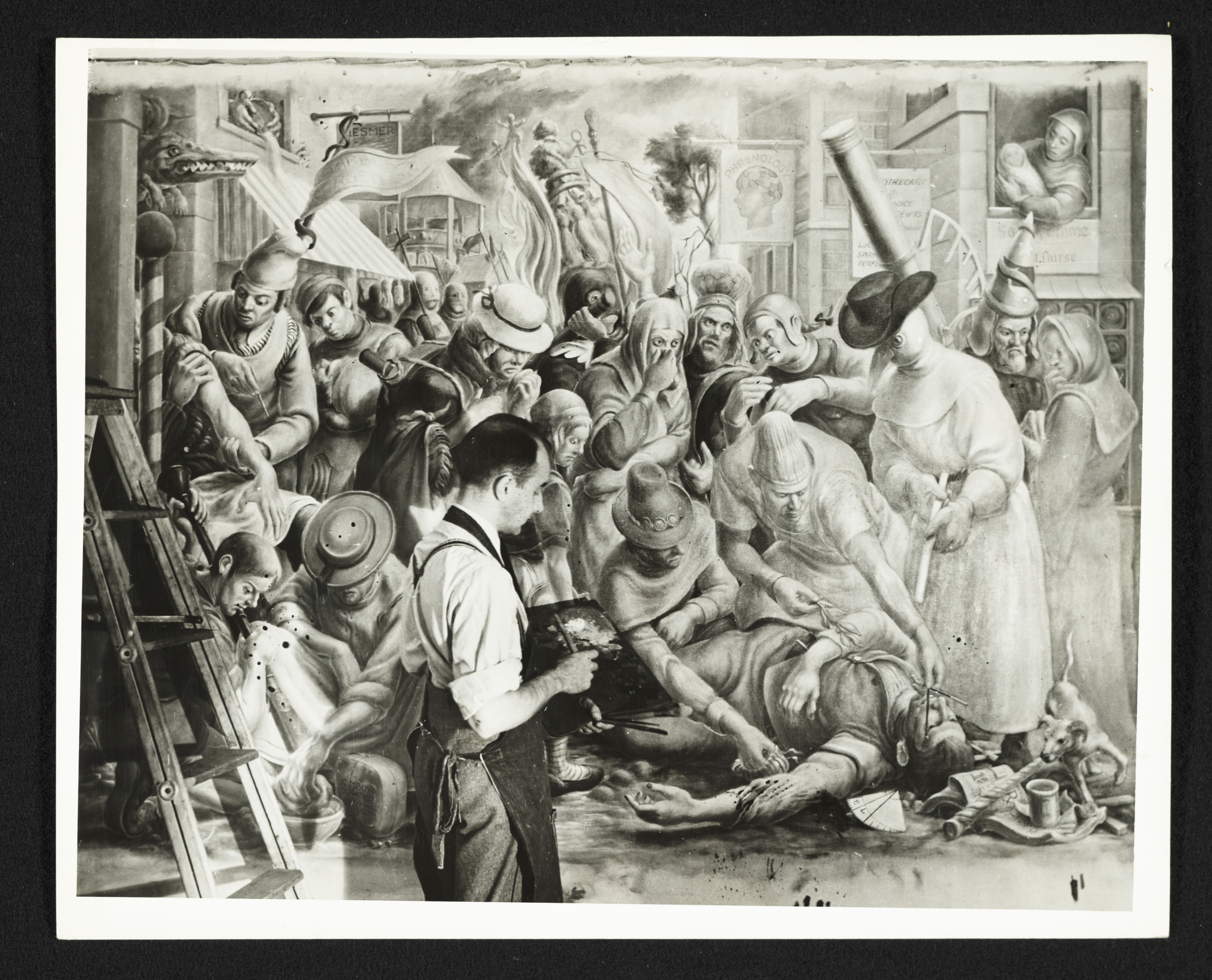
Palmer at work

His work has been displayed worldwide including at the Paris Salon (1937), National Academy of Design (1946), Art Institute of Chicago, Museum of Modern Art in New York City, and the Kansas City Art Institute. His works are included in the collections of the Whitney Museum of American Art, the Munson-Williams-Proctor Arts Institute, the White House, Cranbrook Academy of Art, the National Gallery in Washington and the Metropolitan Museum of Art. His paintings are also on display at the U.S. Post Offices in Arlington, Massachusetts and Monticello, Iowa and at the William Jefferson Clinton Federal Building in Washington, D.C.. The mural based on Pasteur at the Queens General Hospital in Jamaica, New York has been said to be used to teach doctors and nurses.

Palmer was said to have made a sketch every day. After his wife's death, his paintings and papers were left to Hamilton College. An exhibition of his work was created in 2009.

== Gallery ==
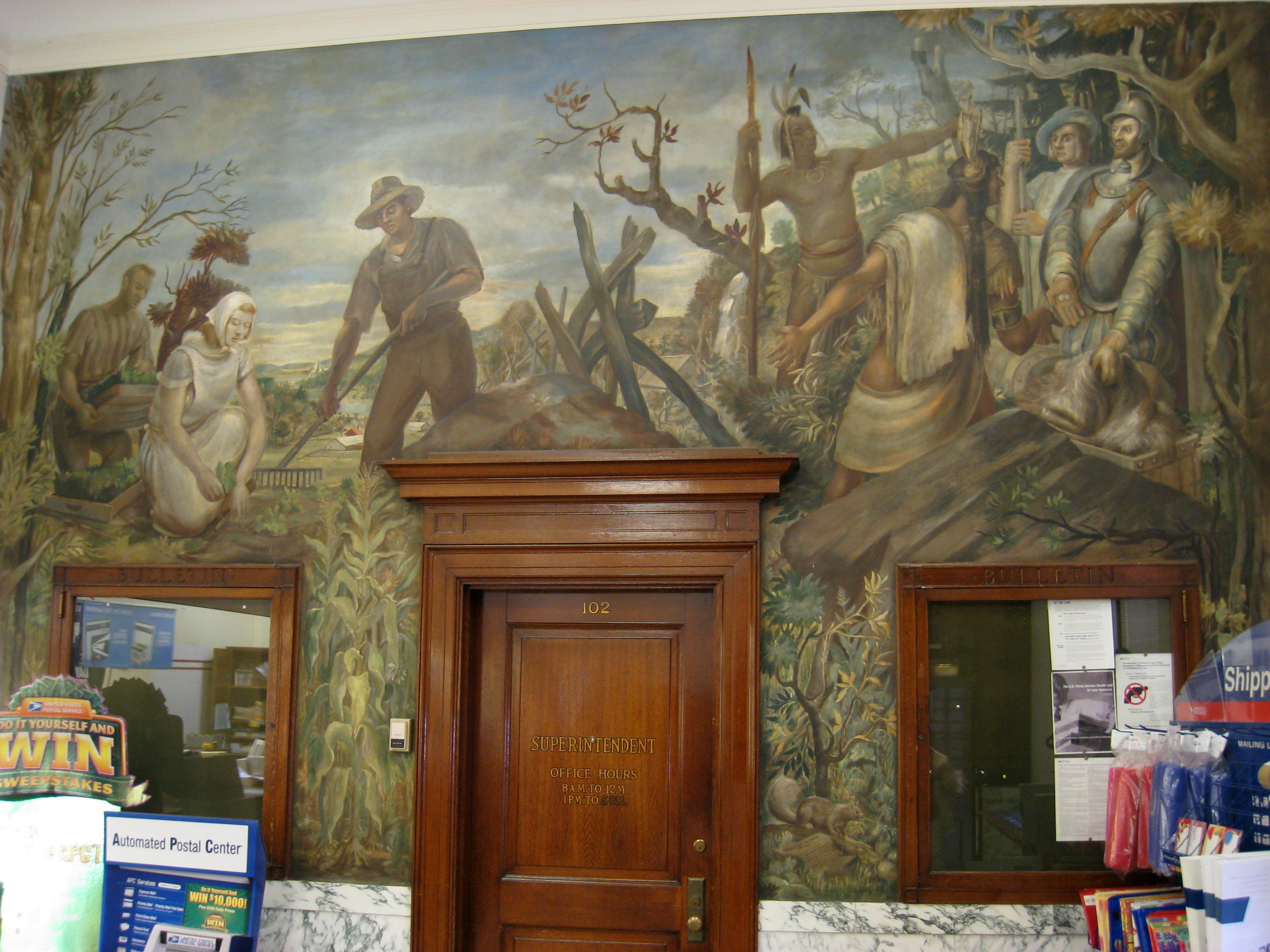
Purchase of Land and Modern Tilling of the Soil, Arlington, Massachusetts, 1938
