= List of United States post office murals in Illinois =

Following is a list of United States post office murals created in Illinois between 1934 and 1943.

Location	Mural title	Image	Artist	Date	Notes	NRHP listed
Berwyn	The Picnic		Richard Haines	1942	oil on canvas	
Bushnell	Pioneer Home in Bushnell		Reva Jackman	1938	oil on canvas	
Cairo	Sandbagging the Bulkheads		Wendell Jones	1944	Completed, but refused. Returned to government custody, but after being shown in an international mural exhibition at the end of World War II	
Carmi	Service to the Farmer		Davenport Griffen	1939	oil on canvas	
Carthage	Pioneers Tilling Soil and Building Log Cabin		Karl Kelpe	1939	oil on canvas	1989
Chicago Loop Station, 211 S. Clark St.	Advent of the Pioneers, 1851		Frances Foy	1938	oil on canvas, was on display at Cardiss Collins Post Office; moved to Loop Station, 211 S. Clark St.	
Chicago Loop Station, 211 S. Clark St.	The Great Indian Council – 1833		Gustaf Dalstrom	1934	oil on canvas, installed at the Chestnut St. Station; moved to Loop Station, 211 S. Clark St.	
Chicago Lakeview Station	Chicago: Epoch of a Great City		Harry Sternberg	1938	oil on canvas; self-portrait of the artist as a scientist in the lower left corner	
Chicago Main Post Office	Mural Maps		Charles Turzak	1937	oil on canvas, 27 panel; painted over but restored in 2000; in the many upper-floor offices of General McCoy, head of the Sixth Army Corpsl	2001
Chicago Morgan Park Station	Father Jacques Marquette, 1674		Theodore Johnson	1937	oil on canvas	
Chillicothe	Railroading		Arthur Lidov	1942	tempera on board	
Clinton	Clinton in Winter		Aaron Bohrod	1939	oil on canvas	
Decatur	The Fusion of Agriculture and Industry		Mitchell Siporin	1938	fresco	
Decatur	Early Pioneers		Edward Millman	1938	three murals and a fresco	
Decatur	Social Consciousness		Edward Millman	1938	three murals and a fresco	
Decatur	Growth of Democracy		Edward Millman	1938	three murals and a fresco	
Decatur	Frank Lloyd Wright		Edgar Britton	1938	fresco	
Decatur	Carl Sandburg		Edgar Britton	1938	fresco	
Decatur	Natural Resources of Illinois		Edgar Britton	1938	fresco	
Decatur	John Deere		Edgar Britton	1938	fresco	
Decatur	Colonel Francis Parker		Edgar Britton	1938	fresco	
Decatur	Development of Illinois		Edgar Britton	1938	fresco	
Des Plaines	Father Marquette		James M. Newell	1945	two murals	
Downers Grove	Chicago, Railroad Center of the World		Elizabeth Tracy	1940	oil on canvas	
Dwight	Stage at Dawn		Carlos Lopez	1937	fresco	
East Alton	The Letter		Frances Foy	1936	oil on canvas	
East Moline	Early Settlers of Moline Along the Mississippi		Edgar Britton	1936	oil on canvas	
Eldorado	Mining in Illinois		William Schwartz	1937	oil on canvas	
Elmhurst	There Was a Vision		George Melville Smith	1938	oil on canvas	
Fairfield	Old Settlers		William Schwartz	1936	oil on canvas	
Flora	Good News and Bad	Davenport Griffen		1937	oil on canvas	
Forest Park	The White Fawn		Miriam McKinnie	1940	damaged during removal; in storage at Forest Park Public Library	
Galesburg	Breaking the Prairie, Log City 1837		Aaron Bohrod	1938	oil on canvas	
Geneva	Fish Fry in the Park		Manuel Bromberg	1941	tempera	
Gibson City	Hiawatha Returning with Minnehaha		Frances Foy	1940	oil on canvas	
Gillespie	Illinois Farm		Gustaf Dalstrom	1935	oil on canvas	
Glen Ellyn	Settlers		Daniel Rhodes	1937	oil on canvas	
Hamilton	On the River		Edmund Lewandowski	1942	oil on canvas	
Herrin	George Rogers Clark Conferring with Indians near Herrin, Illinois		Gustaf Dalstrom	1940	oil on canvas; destroyed	
Lemont	Canal Boats		Charles Turzak	1938	oil on canvas	
Lewistown	Lewistown Milestones		Ida Abelman	1941	tempera	
Madison	Assimilation and Immigration into Industrial Life of Madison		A. Raymond Katz	1940	oil and tempera on canvas	
Marseilles	Industrial Marseilles		Avery F. Johnson	1938	oil on canvas, restored in 2005	
Marshall	Harvest		Miriam McKinnie	1938	oil on canvas	
McLeansboro	The First Mail Flight		Dorothea Mierisch	1941	oil on canvas	
Melrose Park	Airmail		Edwin Boyd Johnson	1937	fresco	
Moline	Ploughshare Manufacturing		Edward Millman	1937	egg tempera on gesso	
Mount Carroll	Rural Scene – Wakarusa Valley		Irene Bianucci	1941	oil on canvas	
Mount Morris	The Growth of Mount Morris		Dale Nichols	1939	oil on canvas	
Mount Sterling	The Covered Bridge		Henry Bernstein	1941	tempera	
Naperville	George Martin's Home Overlooking Old Naper Hill		Rainey Bennett	1941	oil on canvas	
Nashville	Barnyard		Zoltan Seeshy	1942	tempera on wallboard	
Normal	Development of the State Normal School		Albert Pels	1938	oil on canvas	
Oak Park	The Founding of Fort Crevecoeur		J. Theodore Johnson	1939	oil on canvas	
Oak Park	La Salle's Search for Tonti, 1680		J. Theodore Johnson	1939	oil on canvas	
Oak Park	The Pioneer of 1848		J. Theodore Johnson	1939	oil on canvas	
Oak Park	The Osceola – The First Shipment of Wheat from Chicago, 1839		J. Theodore Johnson	1939	oil on canvas	
O'Fallon	John Mason Peck, First Postmaster, Handing Out Mail, 1830		Merlin F. Pollack	1939	oil on canvas	
Oglesby	The Illini and Potawatomies Struggle at Starved Rock		Fay E. Davis	1942	oil on canvas	
Oregon	Pioneer and Democracy		David Cheskin	1940	tempera	
Petersburg	Lincoln at New Salem, Illinois		John Winters	1938	oil on canvas	
Pittsfield	Riverboat and Bridge		William Schwartz (artist)	1938	oil on canvas	
Rushville	Hart Fellows – Builder of Rushville		Rainey Bennett	1940	oil on canvas	
Salem	Lincoln as Postmaster in New Salem		Vladimir Rousseff	1938	oil on canvas	
Shelbyville	Shelby County Fair-1900		Lucia Wiley	1941	fresco	
Staunton	Going to Work		Ralf Hendricksen	1941	oil on canvas	
Tuscola	The Old Days		Edwin Boyd Johnson	1941	oil on canvas	
Vandalia	Old State Capitol Building		Aaron Bohrod	1936	oil on canvas	
Virden	Illinois Pastoral		James Daugherty	1939	tempera and oil	
Wilmette	In the Soil is Our Wealth		Raymond Breinin	1938	oil on canvas	
Wood River	Stagecoach and Mail		Archibald Motley, Jr.	1937	oil on canvas	
