= Ruth Ford (disambiguation) =

Ruth Ford may refer to:

- Ruth Ford (1911–2009), American model and actress
- Ruth VanSickle Ford (1897–1989), American painter and art teacher
- Ruth Atkinson Ford (1918–1997), American cartoonist
