= Reva Jackman =

American painter

- Born: January 16, 1886; Topeka, Kansas, U.S.
- Died: November 1985
- Occupation: Painter
- Years active: Art Institute of Chicago

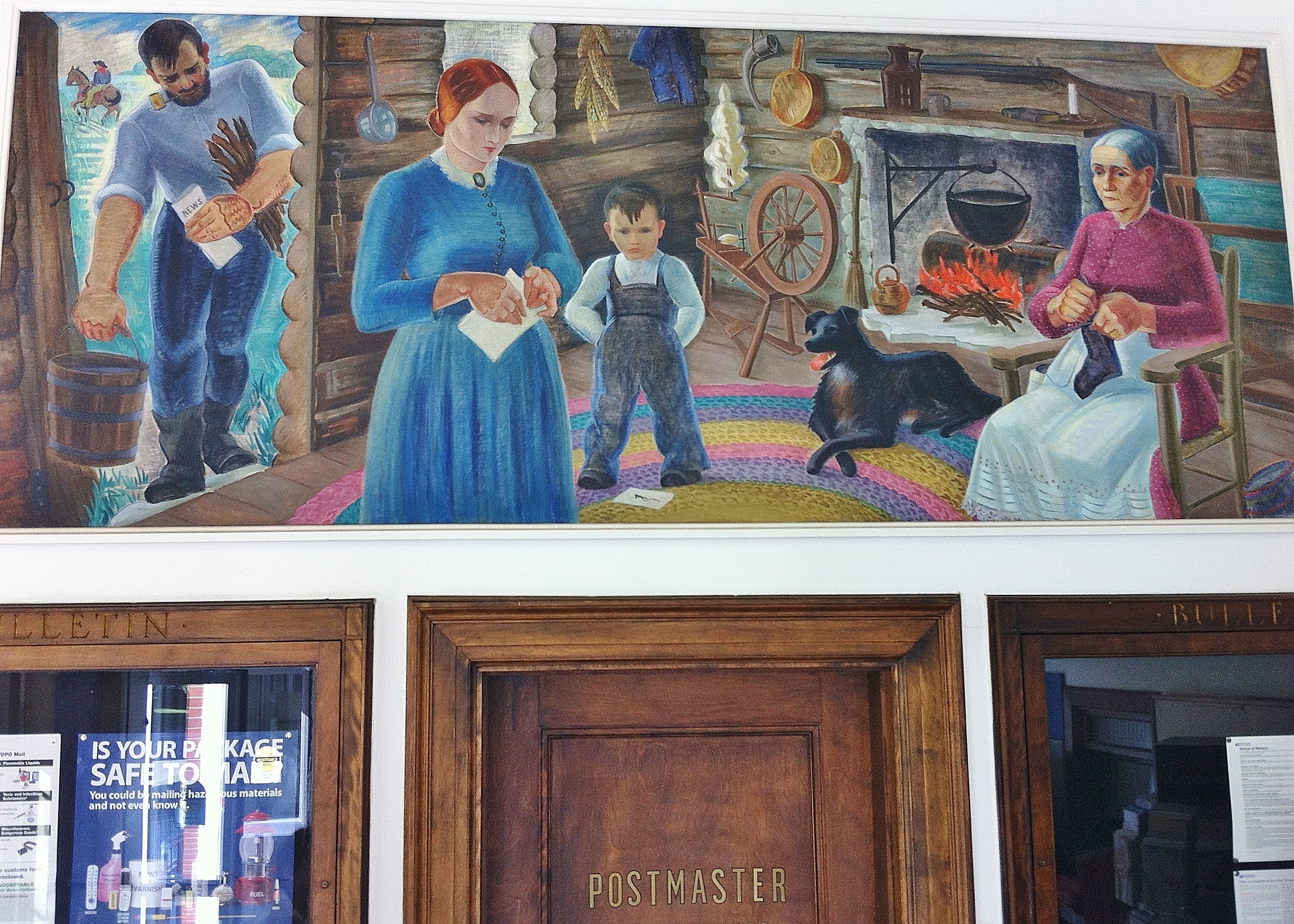
1939, oil on canvas by Jackman

Reva Jackman (January 16, 1886 – November 1985) was an American painter, muralist, printmaker, designer and illustrator born in Wichita, Kansas. She studied at the School of the Art Institute of Chicago with Wellington J. Reynolds and in Paris with André Lhote and Frank Armington

She was an artist with the Federal Art Project and painted post office murals; notable works include Trek of the Covered Wagon to Indiana in the post office in Attica, Indiana and Pioneer Home in Bushnell in Bushnell, Illinois.
