= Carl Werntz =

American artist

Carl Newland Werntz (July 9, 1874 - October 7, 1944) was an American painter, fine arts photographer, illustrator, cartoonist and educator who founded the Chicago Academy of Fine Arts. Werntz was a world traveler who was a proponent of Asian art and Japonisme. Through his own sketching and photographic expeditions to the American Southwest and his influence, he played an important role in the development of painting in the Southwest region in the early 20th century.

== Youth and education ==
Carl Werntz was born in Sterling, Illinois. He moved to Chicago about 1900. Werntz studied at the Chicago Art Institute with the legendary anatomist John Vanderpoel, Frederick Freer, Lawton S. Parker, Jeanette Pratt, Orson Lowell and the great Art Nouveau master Alphonse Mucha who was then in Chicago. He left for Paris where he studied with the American Impressionist painter Richard E. Miller and Onorato Carlandi in Rome. He also studied at the Académie Colarossi in Paris. In Paris, Werntz came under the influence of Japonisme and he became so interested in Japanese art that he traveled to Japan where he studied with Mizuno Toshikata and Kaho Kawakita.

== In Chicago ==
After the conclusion of his studies, Werntz settled back in Chicago and opened a home and studio at 18 South Michigan Avenue. He was a cartoonist with the Chicago Record and did illustrations for Midwestern publications as well as National publications such as "Life", "Redbook", "Century", and "Art and Archeology". He also was a newspaper illustrator who did work for the London News and the New York Times. Werntz exhibited his paintings at the Chicago Art Institute and was a member of the Palette and Chisel Club. His work was also exhibited at the Pennsylvania Academy of Fine Arts and the Society of Western Artists. He was one of the main illustrators for the high-brow Chicago literary publication The Four O'Clock. Werntz also illustrated columns by the famous Chicago writer George Ade along with Charles Sarka and Clyde Newman. The artist was married to Millicent Mary Wetmore Werntz (born, November 4, 1886) who survived him and later lived in Reno, Nevada.

=== The Chicago Academy of Fine Arts ===
Werntz founded the Chicago Academy of Fine Arts in 1902. This is not to be confused with the previous Academy of Fine Arts that turned into the Art Institute of Chicago, which has since become the School of the Art Institute of Chicago. The goal of the Chicago Academy was to give students a practical career. Emma M. Church and E.M. Ashcroft Jr. were also directors in the early years of the school. The Academy played a complementary role to the Art Institute of Chicago, which was a much larger school that had a fine arts program based on French atelier teaching. In contrast, Werntz designed the school he founded to offer commercial and applied art courses as well as fine arts instruction. He offered cartooning and illustration courses as well as fashion design and fashion illustration. In 1910, the school was located at 81 East Madsion Street. It advertised "Sunshine Painting and Illustrating Classes - wonderful effects, day and night. This enabled students to learn the principles of painting out of doors scenes in indoor settings. In 1937, during the Great Depression, the school was sold to the artist Ruth VanSickle Ford (1897–1989), who had studied at the Academy under Werntz from 1915-1918. Many prominent artists studied at the Academy including the California painter Theodore Lukits (1897–1992), the Taos painter Dale Nichols (1904–1995) and the cartoonist, animator and entrepreneur Walt Disney.

==== Southwest ====
Because of Werntz' passionate interest in the American Southwest, a number of his students ventured there to paint and live. William Victor Higgins (1884–1949) who later became famous as a member of the Taos Ten, the Taos Society of Artists was employed by Werntz as a teacher at the academy as was the well known Chicago society portrait painter Wellington J. Reynolds.

William Penhallow Henderson (1877–1943), another painter active in Taos with Werntz, taught at the school from 1904 to 1910.

== Photography career ==
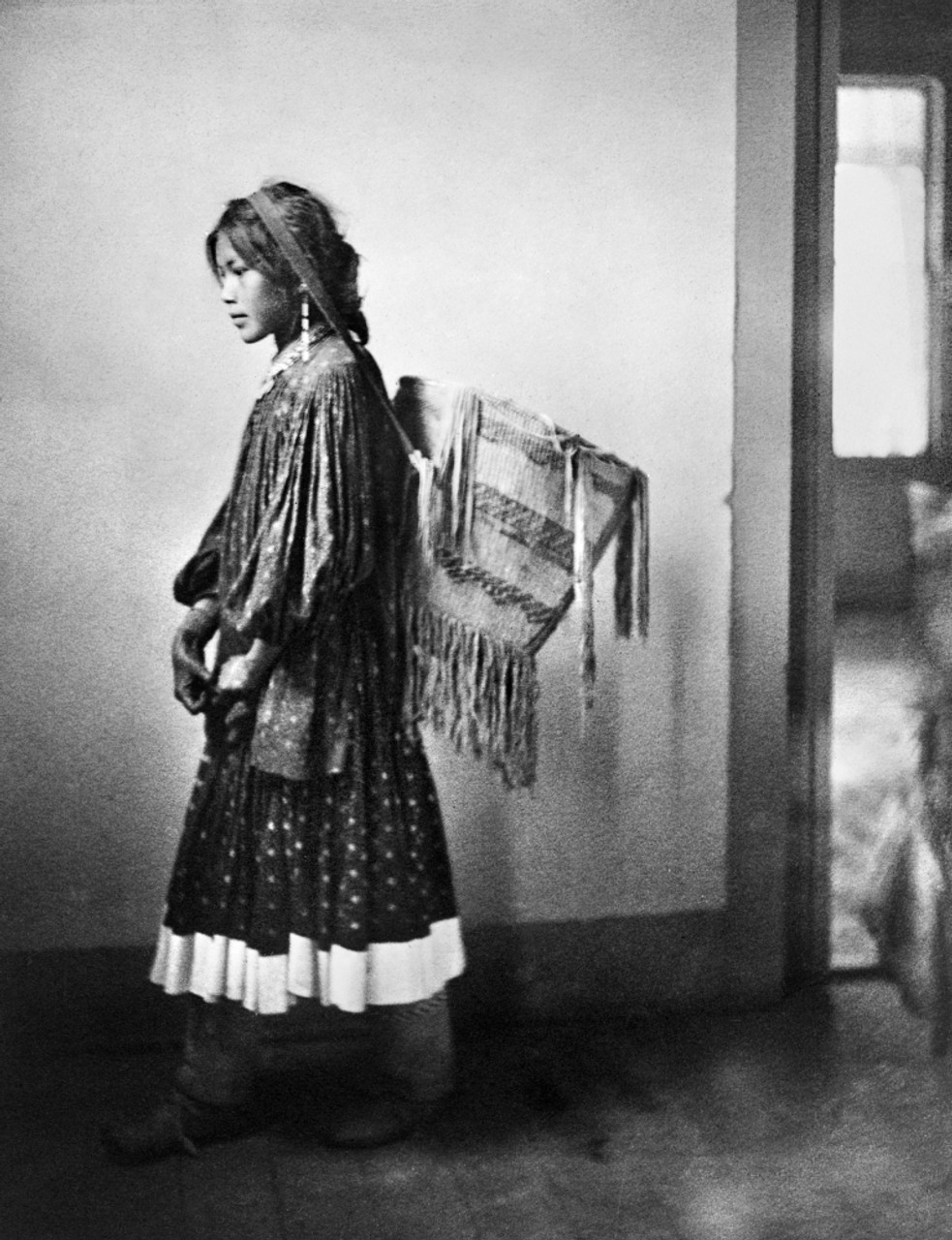
Apache girl with basket (gelatin silver print) ca. 1902

Carl Werntz was a 'Camera Pictorialist' photographer. He ventured to the Southwestern United States to record Native American life in Arizona and New Mexico. He visited the Pueblos, and the historic Hubbell Trading Post in Arizona in the early 1900s. The Hubbell Trading Post is now a National Historic Site. Werntz was photographed by the famous Parisian photographer Man Ray and copies of these images are in the collection of the Archives of American Art.

== Prolific travels ==
Carl Werntz may have been the best traveled artist of his era. While the New York and then California-based marine scenes painter Paul Dougherty also made many extended painting trips, Werntz traveled even more extensively and to more exotic lands. He made countless trips to Europe and extended trips to China and Japan. For about thirty years he and his wife Millicent - who seemed to thrive on lengthy trips as much as her husband did and accompanied him on every one - usually made at least one extended trip abroad each year.

He and Millicent left for Europe in the fall of 1911 and returned in January 1912. He returned to Europe in 1914, just before the outbreak of World War I. During the First World War, when Europe was in flames, he went to Japan and China in 1916 and Japan in 1917. At the conclusion of the war he and his wife went to the Caribbean - to Jamaica and Puerto Rico. They were back in Japan in 1923, then back in Europe in 1924, 1925, 1928 and 1930. In 1935, he and Millicent were back in Asia, then in Europe a few months later. With war clouds gathering again, they were back in Europe in 1937 and in England after the outbreak of war in 1939. In 1940, they were in South America, where it was still safe to travel, the last records of their travels that are currently available. In 1944, Werntz died in Mexico City, while he and his wife were making one final trip south during World War II where travel to Europe or Asia was impossible.

== Memberships and affiliations ==
- American Artists Professional League
- American Federation of Artists
- Chicago Art Club
- Chicago Artists Guild
- Palette and Chisel Club

== See also ==
- American Impressionism
- Palette and Chisel Academy of Fine Art
