= Frances Foy =

American painter

Frances Foy (April 11, 1890 – 1963) was an American painter, muralist, illustrator, and etcher born in Chicago, Illinois.

== Career ==
Foy began studying art with Wellington J. Reynolds at the Chicago Academy of Fine Arts and later attended the School of the Art Institute of Chicago, where she continued studying with Reynolds as well as with George Bellows and Fred Schook. Foy completed commercial work and began to exhibit her work in many venues in the 1920s, including the Chicago No-Jury Society of Artists, Chicago Woman's Aid, the Romany Club, and the Art Institute of Chicago. She and her classmates were active in Chicago's progressive movement in the 1920s and 1930s. In 1928, she and her husband, Gustaf Dalstrom, traveled with other artists to Europe, where she was directly exposed to European modernists. She was a member of the Chicago Society of Artists and served on the technical committee of the Federal Public Works of Art Project.

== Family life ==
She married fellow artist and her mentor, Gustaf Dalstrom, in 1923. They settled in the Lincoln Park area of Chicago and often painted scenes of community life, including the Lincoln Park Zoo and neighborhood schoolchildren.

== Murals ==
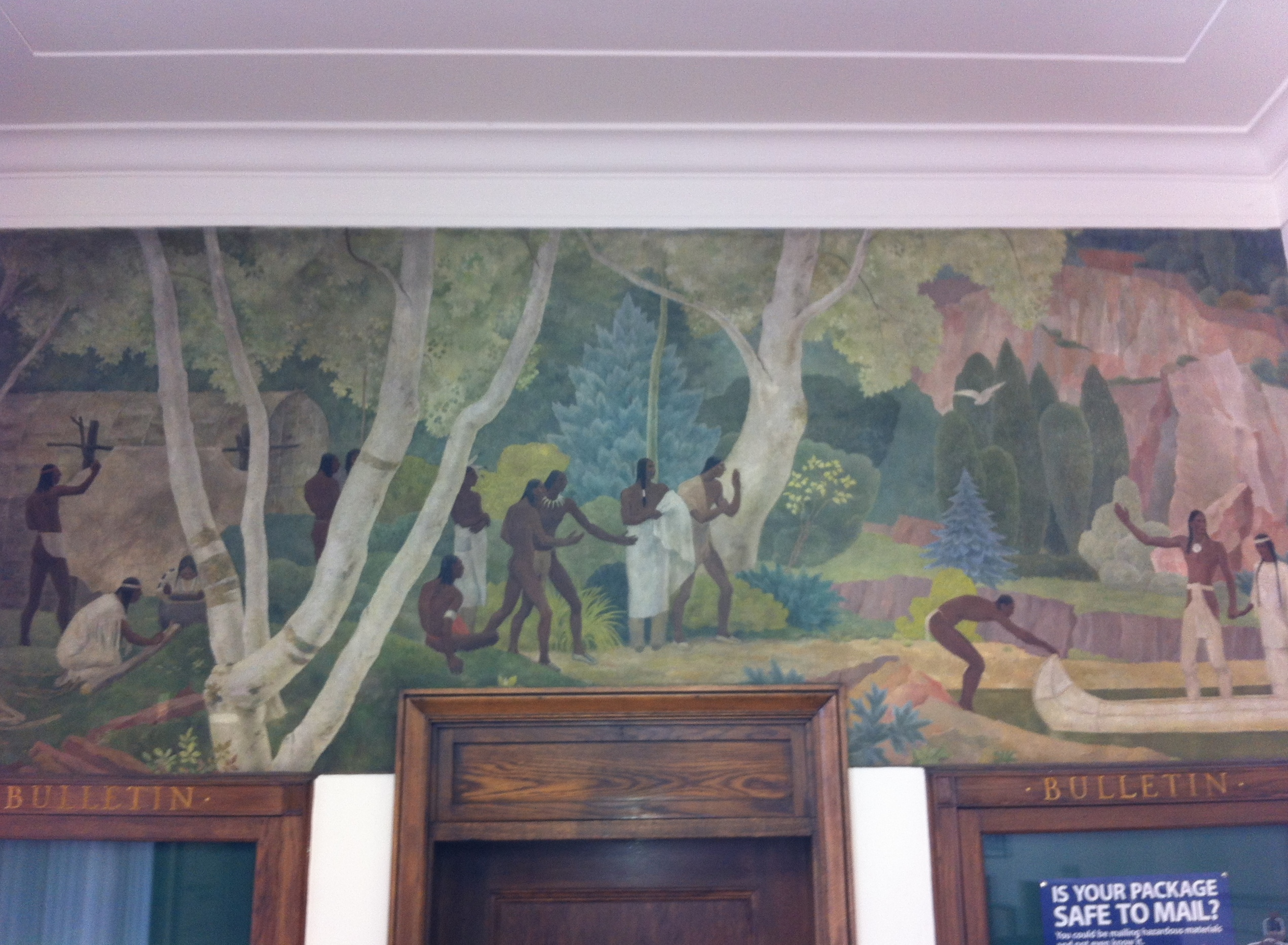
Hiawatha Returning with Minnehaha

Foy received commissions for murals through the Section of Painting and Sculpture, later called the Section of Fine Arts, of the United States Treasury Department. In 1943, Foy painted two murals in the West Allis, Wisconsin post office, Wisconsin Wild Flowers – Spring and Wisconsin Wild Flowers – Autumn.
