= Ruth VanSickle Ford =

American painter (1897–1989)

Ruth Van Sickle Ford
- Born: Ruth Van Sickle; August 8, 1897; Aurora, Illinois
- Died: April 18, 1989 (aged 91); Aurora, Illinois
- Education: Chicago Academy of Fine Arts, Carl Newland Werntz, John F. Carlson, George Bellows
- Known for: Painting, educator
- Movement: Realism
- Spouse: Albert (Sam) Ford

Ruth Van Sickle Ford (August 8, 1897 – April 18, 1989) was an American painter, art teacher, and owner of the Chicago Academy of Fine Arts. She credited artists George Bellows, who influenced her interest in social realism, and John Carlson, who founded the School of Landscape Painting in Woodstock, New York, with helping her to develop her talent. She traveled and made paintings in the United States, Caribbean and South America. An award-winner, her works are in many permanent public and private collections. A book has been written about her entitled Warm Light, Cool Shadows: The Life and Art of Ruth Van Sickle Ford.

== Personal life and education ==
Ruth Van Sickle was born August 8, 1897 in Aurora, Illinois to Charles P. Van Sickle and Anna Miller, who had immigrated from Germany in 1879. The Van Sickles, who owned the restaurant The Rookery, were married about 1891. She was an only child and grew up on the west side of Aurora, Illinois. She attended West Aurora High School. After high school graduation in 1915, she enrolled at the Chicago Academy of Fine Arts, where she studied under Carl Newland Werntz and graduated in 1918. Van Sickle was a classmate of Walt Disney, with whom she stayed in contact after school. She continued studying art and credited the influences of teachers John Carlson, founder of the School of Landscape Painting in Woodstock, New York, and social realist George Bellows. She also studied at the Art Students League, Chicago and the New York Art Students League summer school.

She married civil engineer Albert (Sam) Ford in 1918 in a military ceremony in Houston, Texas. After the wedding he departed for service in the First World War. In 1918 Ruth traveled while pregnant to visit a relative in Utah and gave birth while on the trip to their only child, Barbara. After the war, the Fords settled in Aurora. Barbara graduated from West Aurora High School in 1936 and attended Wellesley College.

Ford did not consider herself a feminist, but believed that "if a woman has the desire to do something, she should do it." She used the name Ruth Van Sickle Ford, when it was unusual to maintain the maiden surname, because she would often get notes intended for Ruth Ford, a local strip-tease artist.

Round House, Aurora

Ford herself recounted how people would peer in the windows at the most inopportune moments, such as the day she stepped out from a bath only to find several ladies observing her through the glass. She famously went to the front door and asked the ladies if they, too, would like a bath in her house.

— Mary Clark Ormond, Aurora Historical Society

In 1949, the Fords hired architect Bruce Goff, an instructor at the Chicago Academy of Fine Arts, to design and construct a house generally known as "Round House" at 404 South Edgelawn Avenue on Aurora's west side. Said to be modeled after a Tibetan nomad tent, it was also known as the Umbrella House, Mushroom House and Coal House, and attracted curiosity-seekers. It was a balloon-like structure with walls made of coal and chunks of colored glass that had an open interior floor plan. In April 1951 it was described as a "Hollywood fantasy" and a "fine spangling lustrous toy" by the Architectural Forum magazine.

Tired of the attention that their home received, in 1961 they sold it and moved to a conventional ranch house a few blocks away.

Sam Ford died in 1984. Ruth Van Sickle Ford died April 18, 1989, aged 91. A collection of her papers, photographs, letters, and other archived material was donated by her daughter, Barbara Turner, and is held at the Archives of American Art.

== Career ==
=== Artist ===
Ruth VanSickle Ford, The Little Traveler, oil, 1930s, Aurora Public Library Collection

Ford worked first as a commercial artist. She was chosen to exhibit in the 1921 American Show at the Art Institute of Chicago. She exhibited her work throughout the United States and the Caribbean islands, garnering numerous awards, including some very prestigious gold and silver medals. Her watercolors and oils are to be found in many museums and private collections, including the Smithsonian Institution in Washington, D.C. Her works were exhibited in 1933 to 1934 at the Art Institute of Chicago's "Century of Progress" show.

Ford traveled to particularly colorful places like Bermuda, Haiti, Mexico and places within the United States to make some of her favorite paintings. Since her husband did not enjoy traveling, she went by herself or with her daughter. In Haiti her work was exhibited at the National Museum of Art, Haiti; She was the first person outside of the country to exhibit there.

She made portraits of adults and children, still lifes, cityscapes, landscapes and paintings of everyday country and urban life. Ford had studio space at Tree Studios in Chicago, as did John W. Norton and Albin Polasek. In 1947 an exhibition was held at the Grand Central Art Galleries entitled Watercolors of Mexico by Ruth Van Sickle Ford.

=== Educator ===
Some students came in wanting encouragement and a pat on the shoulder; she was not that kind of teacher. Not until they'd earned it. What they got until that time was criticism and instruction, usually in the form of some biting pet phrase: Where'd you get that color? You need glasses! Let me sit down here; I'll show you how it's done.

— Benjie Hughes, The best Aurora had to offer.

In 1921 and again in 1930 Ruth began teaching at the Chicago Academy of Fine Arts. In 1937 she purchased the school with money borrowed from friends during the Great Depression and became its president and Director. She continued to teach watercolor and oil painting. She commuted from Aurora to Chicago every weekday, working from early morning and into the evening. For many years the school was located on the 12th floor of 18 South Michigan Avenue. She wrote at length about her theories of art education, including her statement that an art school graduate "should certainly be able to forge ahead with confidence, enthusiasm and a business-like application of his art training." One of her most famous Chicago students was political cartoonist Bill Mauldin. She lived her intention to make art and art education affordable.

In 1961 she sold the academy and began teaching classes at the local YMCA. From 1964 to 1973 taught at Aurora College, now Aurora University. The college awarded her an honorary doctorate in 1974.

During her life she was also an instructor at Beloit College in Wisconsin.

=== Awards ===
- 1931 - Fine Arts Building Prize, Annual Exhibition of Works by Chicago and Vicinity Artists, AIC
- 1934 - Connecticut Academy of Fine Arts, 1934
- 1935 - Chicago Woman's Aid Club Prize, Annual Exhibition of Works by Chicago and Vicinity Artists, AIC
- 1964 - Women's Gold Medallion, Palette and Chisel Academy of Fine Art
- 2002 - Fox Valley Arts Hall of Fame, Illinois, charter inductee

=== Professional organizations ===
She became the first woman member from Illinois of the American Watercolor Society in 1954 and the first woman member of the Palette and Chisel Academy of Fine Art in 1960. She was also a member of the American Artist Professional League, the Chicago Painters and Sculptors Association, the National Association of Women Artists, the Philadelphia Watercolor Club and the Chicago Society of Artists, Inc.

She helped found the Chicago Women's Salon.

=== Collections ===
Her work is in the collections of the:

- Aurora Public Library, Illinois
- Aurora University, Illinois
- Barbara and Powell Bridges Collection, Chicago
- Brauer Museum of Art, Valparaiso University, Valparaiso, Indiana
- Plum Landing, Aurora, Illinois
- West Aurora High School, Voris Library, Illinois
