= Harry Sternberg =

American painter

- Born: July 19, 1904; New York City, New York, U.S.
- Died: November 27, 2001 (aged 97); Escondido, California, U.S.
- Education: Art Students League of New York
- Employer: Art Students League of New York
- Known for: painting, muralist, educator
- Spouse: Mary Gosney (m. 1939–2001)
- Awards: Guggenheim Fellowship (1936)

Harry Sternberg (1904–2001), was an American painter, printmaker and educator. He taught at the Art Students League of New York, from 1933 to c. 1966.

== Biography ==
=== Childhood, family life, and education ===
Sternberg's parents had immigrated from Russia and Hungary. He was born in New York City on July 19, 1904. Harry, the youngest of eight children, was born in his family's tenement apartment on the Lower East Side of New York. The family moved to Brooklyn in 1910 and Harry began orthodox Jewish religious training. At the age of nine he began to take art classes at the Brooklyn Museum of Art. From 1922 until 1926, he trained at the Art Students League of New York. He rented his first studio in Greenwich Village in 1926 and began his career in etching, printmaking and painting.

=== Early career ===
In 1931, his work was exhibited at the Whitney Museum of American Art for the first time. He was appointed in 1933 to the staff of the Art Students League of New York where he would remain an instructor for the next 35 years. Among his students were Sigmund Abeles, Isabel Bishop, Minna Citron, Riva Helfond, Itshak Holtz, Charles Keller, Knox Martin, Karl Schrag, Mavis Pusey, and Charles White.

After meeting Diego Rivera, the prominent Mexican muralist, and his wife Frida Kahlo in 1934 Sternberg became more politically active in union and socialist causes. In 1935, he was appointed a technical advisor to the Graphic Art Division, Federal Art Project (FAP) of the Works Progress Administration.

As a result of the experimentation in screen printing at the FAP, by a team led by Anthony Velonis, interest in silkscreen printing, as an accessible and flexible means of artistic expression, was growing. The process was re-named 'Serigraphy'. Carl Zigrosser, then Curator of Prints, Drawings, and Rare books at the Philadelphia Museum of Art, wrote in 1941: “Harry Sternberg has done much to spread an interest in silk screen. He was one of the first to see its implications both social and aesthetic. In addition to his own production he has added serigraphy to his graphic arts curriculum at the Art Students League and has written a most stimulating handbook on the subject."

In The Early History of the Screenprint by Reba Williams and Dave Williams, the authors note that the efforts of many printmakers to achieve a 'painterly' effect in their prints has been subject to criticism for the use of conspicuous brushstrokes and overlapping or blurring colors, rather than flat planes of color which are so suited to the medium. They wrote in their 1986 article in Print Quarterly that: "Sternberg's Riveter is perhaps the most daring and successful of the painterly screen prints. It draws heavily on German Expressionism in color, composition, subject and style. A powerful workman, standing on a steel beam, constructing a New York skyscraper, wielding a heavy riveting gun, attached to a curling, treacherous air hose, surrounded by dizzying high towers -- a perfect subject for Expressionism! Here Sternberg plays on the potential for 'crudeness' in screen printing: rough edges between color planes and contrasting tonal effects. . .Overall, the colors, composition and drawing style convey power and tension, harmonious in theme and medium."

Sternberg was awarded a Guggenheim Fellowship in 1936, and spent the year studying the conditions of workers in coal mines and steel mills. His drawings, etchings and paintings depicting life in industrial America influenced his subsequent post office mural designs.

=== New Deal art ===
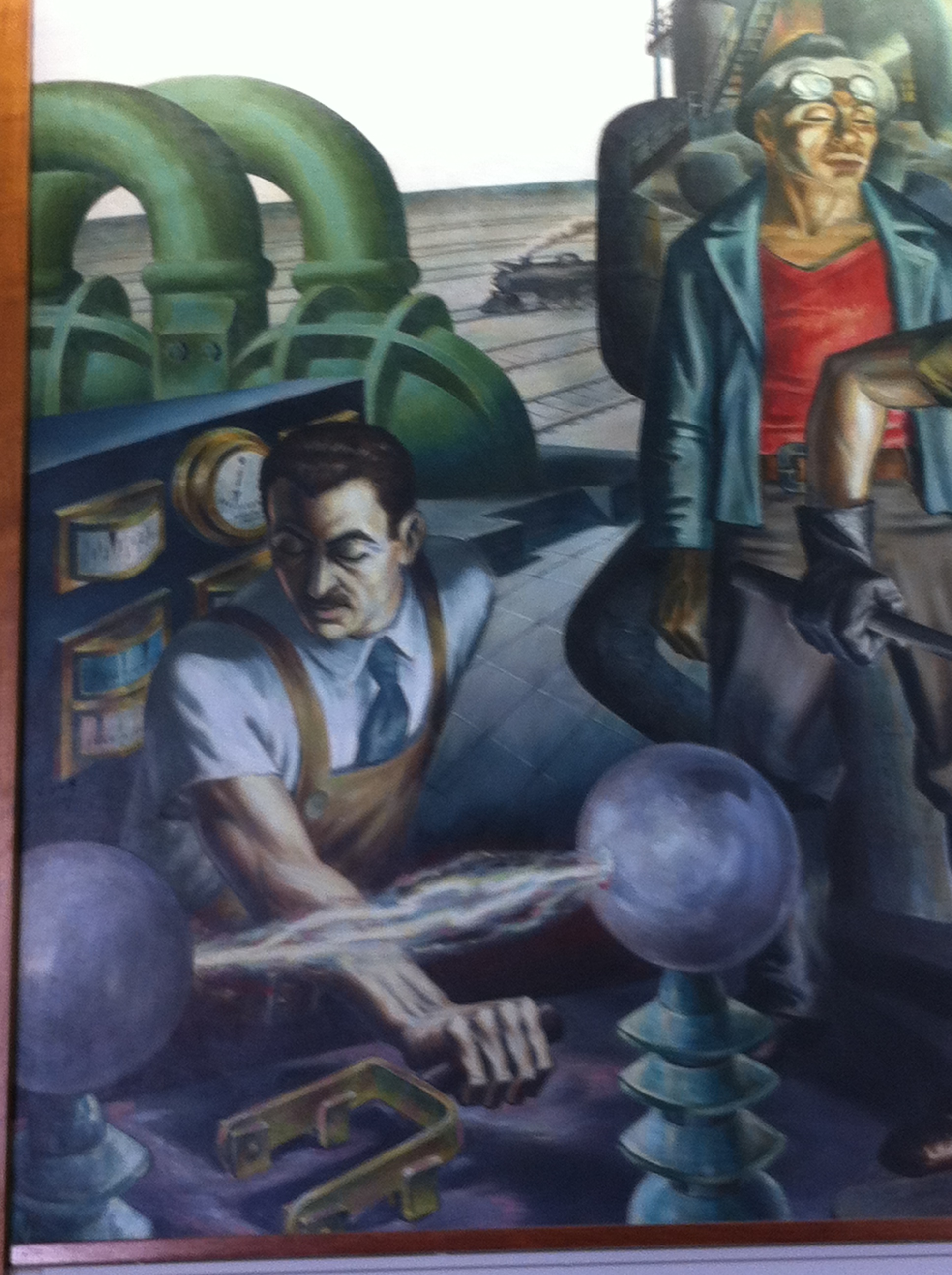
Muralist, Harry Sternberg, depicting a scientist in his mural "Chicago:Epoch of a Great City"

In 1937, Sternberg painted his first post office mural, Carrying the Mail in Sellersville, Pennsylvania. The mural was commissioned by the former United States Department of the Treasury Section of Painting and Sculpture, later known as the Section of Fine Arts. Sternberg traveled to Chicago, where he studied the city's history, architecture, industry, and workers which resulted in his mural Chicago: Epoch of a Great City, for the Lakeview post office in Chicago. It depicts the history of the city from its first settlement of Fort Dearborn to the Great Fire to the life in the stock yards and the steel mills. In 1906, Upton Sinclair's novel, The Jungle, had graphically described life for workers in Chicago's stockyards and steel mills and Sternberg strived to captured their struggle. In June 2001, a non-profit community organization, Friends of the Lakeview Post Office, was founded to facilitate a restoration of the mural. Parma Conservation of Chicago completed the work in 2003.

In participating in the WPA, I felt that I was part of one of the most vital and important cultural movements in America

He married Mary Gosney in 1939 and their family, including their baby daughter, are depicted in the Ambler, Pennsylvania post office mural, The Family, Industry and Agriculture. He was fond of self-portraits and painted his likeness into the scientist figure in his mural for the Lakeview post office.

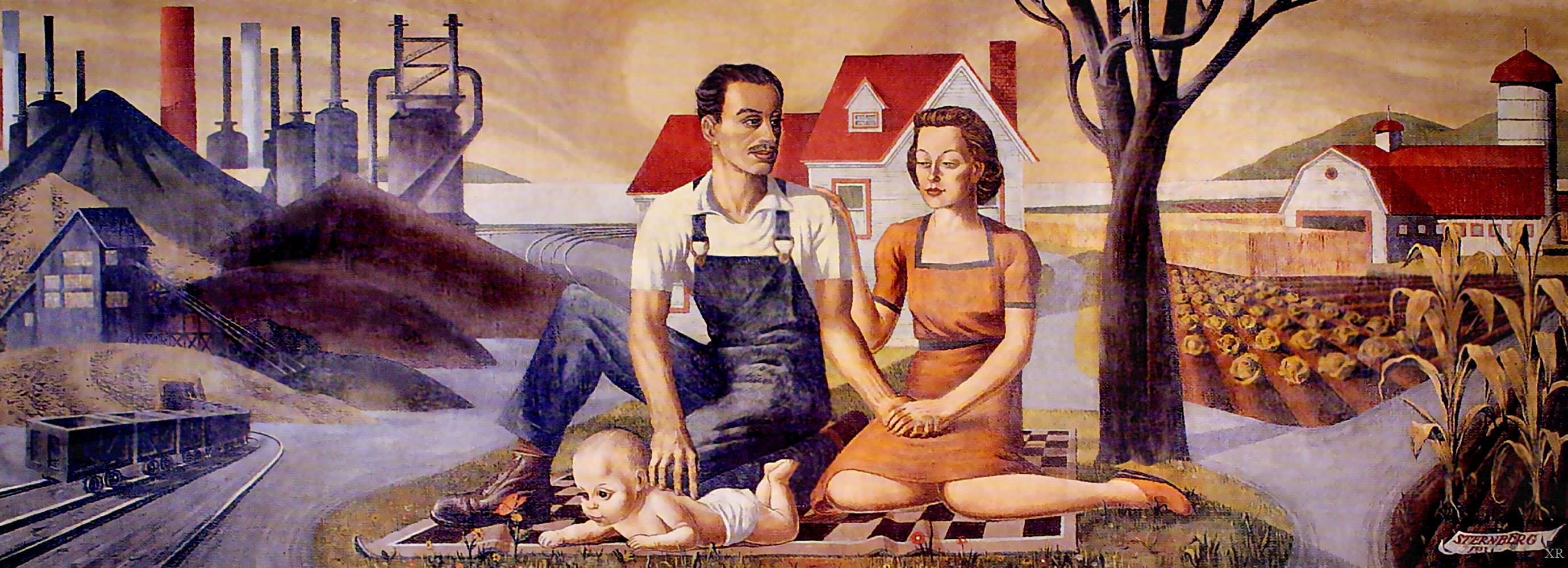
The Family, Industry and Agriculture, 1939, WPA mural by Harry Sternberg, in the old Ambler, Pennsylvania post office

=== Later career ===
In 1966, he retired from the Art Students League of New York and the Sternbergs moved to Escondido, California, where he established a studio and continued to work as an artist and an educator for 35 more years, his paintings and woodcuts capturing the beauty of the southern California desert and culture. For many summers, he taught painting at the Idyllwild School of Music and the Arts (ISOMATA) in Idyllwild, California.

Between 1969 and 1978, he participated in The Orme School Fine Arts Festival, known as the dean of the festival, exposing high school students to the work and instruction of professional artists. In 1990 he published a collection of prints: Sternberg: A Life in Woodcuts, one of which depicts his painting of the Lakeview post office mural.

In 2000, his life and work were celebrated by a major retrospective exhibition: No Sun Without Shadow: The Art of Harry Sternberg at the Museum–California Center for the Arts, Escondido, California. The catalog of this exhibition was researched and written by Ellen Fleurov, the museum director. Harry Sternberg died on November 27, 2001, in Escondido. He had previously written and published two books: a book on composition called Composition: The Anatomy of Picture Making, and a book on woodblock cutting and printing called Woodcut.

He died in Escondido, California, on November 27, 2001.

== Publications ==
- Sternberg, Harry (1958). Composition: The Anatomy of Picture Making. Pitman Publishing. ISBN 978-0273408130.
- Sternberg, Harry (1942). Silk Screen Color Printing: presenting a new addition to the graphic arts--serigraphy : a demonstration and explanation of the process of making "multiple original" color prints. London, UK: McGraw-Hill Book Company, Inc. OCLC 519230.

== See also ==
- Art Students League of New York
- New Masses
- Federal Art Project
- Works Progress Administration
