= Edward Millman =

American painter

- Born: January 1, 1907; Chicago, Illinois, U.S.
- Died: February 11, 1964 (aged 57); Woodstock, New York, U.S.
- Education: School of the Art Institute of Chicago
- Occupation: Painter

Edward Millman (January 1, 1907 – February 11, 1964) was an American painter. His work is in the permanent collections of the Museum of Modern Art, the Smithsonian American Art Museum, and the Whitney Museum of American Art.
