= Airmail (fresco) =

1937 painting by Edwin Boyd Johnson

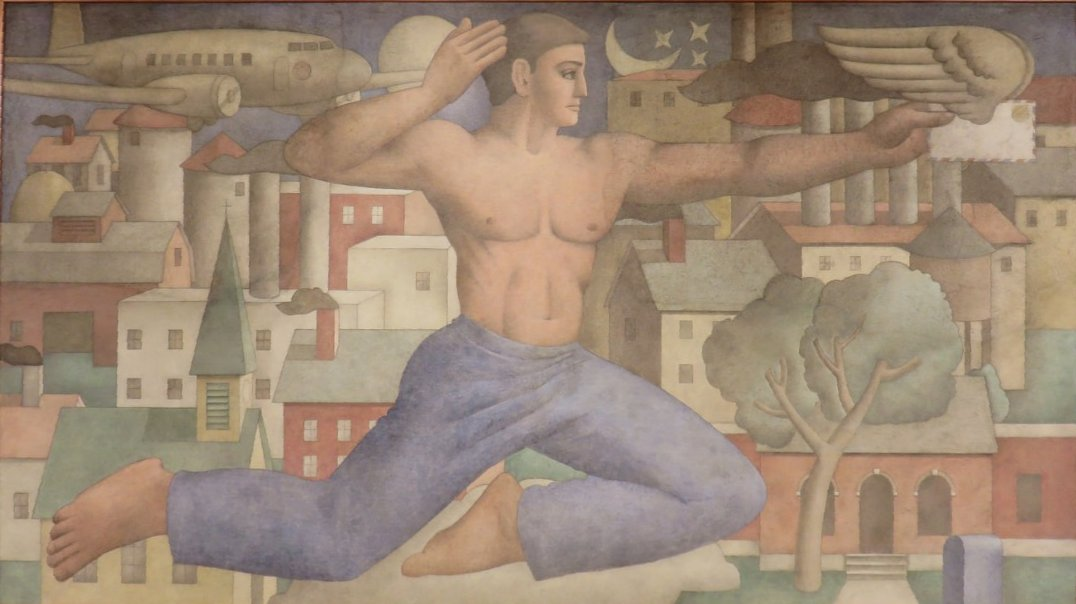
- Artist: Edwin Boyd Johnson
- Year: 1937
- Medium: Fresco
- Location: Melrose Park, Illinois, United States

Airmail is a 4-by-8-foot (1.2 × 2.4 m) fresco painting by American artist Edwin Boyd Johnson. Located in Melrose Park, Illinois, it was painted in 1937, in what was then the village's post office, and has since become its public library.

The fresco features a giant barefoot and bare-chested male mailman flying over a town scene whilst holding a winged letter. An airplane is seen in the skies behind him. This was chosen as Melrose Park was one of the first airmail facilities used by the United States Post Service and the fresco was painted to commemorate it.

== History ==
Airmail was created as part of a New Deal program to help unemployed artists. The United States Post Office commissioned around 100 pieces of art in Illinois under this scheme. Edwin Boyd Johnson painted Airmail, finishing it in 1937. Between 1937 and 1971, it was located in the postmaster's office. When the post office closed, it was renovated to become the public library, during which time the fresco was lost and presumed destroyed.

The mural was rediscovered in 2007 following a man named Richard Grunt investigating Johnson's work after remembering seeing Airmail at the post office when he was a child. When he contacted the library about it, the librarian explored behind a drop ceiling and rediscovered it. Airmail was in bad condition, with the center piece being "punched out", and the top and bottom of the fresco being chipped. It is believed to have been damaged following removal to install new air ducts during the transformation from post office to library. Appeals were made to cover the $50,000 bill for restoration. The money was raised by a combination of local societies and Fifth Third Bank in 2010. After a six-month restoration, it was unveiled at Melrose Park Historical Center before being returned to the library for permanent display.

== See also ==
- Cincinnati Union Terminal § Artwork – numerous large murals in a similar style
