= John Fabian Carlson =

Swedish-American landscape painter, teacher and author

John F. Carlson
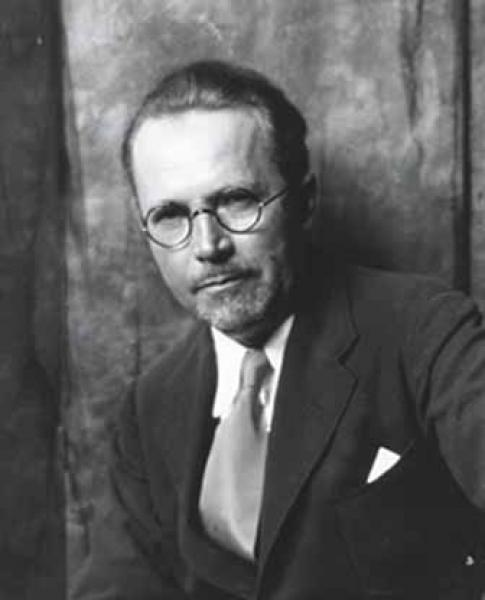
- Born: Johan Fabian Carlsson; May 5, 1875; Ukna, Västerviks kommun, Kalmar län, Sweden
- Died: March 20, 1945 (aged 69); New York City, New York, USA
- Years active: 1906-1945
- Known for: Landscape painting
- Awards: National Academy of Design Andrew Carnegie Prize

John Fabian Carlson (1875–1945) was a 20th-century Swedish-American landscape painter, teacher and author. He was known for his meditative winter scenes rendered in the tonalist tradition. He was co-founder of the Woodstock School of Landscape Painting and founder of the John Fabian Carlson School of Landscape Painting in Woodstock, NY. In 1928 he wrote Elementary Principles of Landscape Painting which was later reissued as Carlson's Guide to Landscape Painting.

== Early life and education ==
Carlson was born on May 5, 1875, in Västervik, Småland, Sweden, the son of Carl Vilhelm Theodor Carlsson and Clara Mathilda Larsdotter Carlsson. In 1889 he moved to Buffalo, NY with his family where he lived until 1901. His formal training began at the Albright School of Art. He studied painting at the Art Students League of Buffalo under Lucius Wolcott Hitchcock, where he won many prizes and a scholarship to the Art Students League of New York. At the Art Students League of New York he studied under Birge Harrison and Frank Vincent DuMond. In 1904, Carlson received a scholarship to study landscape painting at Byrdcliffe Colony with Birge Harrison.

== Career ==
In 1906 Carlson joined Harrison as his assistant in Woodstock.

In April 1911 he was elected associate member of the National Academy of Design, becoming a full member in 1925. In June 1911 he began his seven-year tenure as director of the Art Students League Summer School program in landscape at Woodstock, NY, succeeding Birge Harrison.

He headed the Broadmoor School of Art in Colorado Springs from 1921 to 1922.

In 1923 he returned to Woodstock, NY and founded the John F. Carlson School of Landscape Painting which he led until 1938. He continued to teach at the School of Landscape Painting until his death in 1945.

== Selected works ==
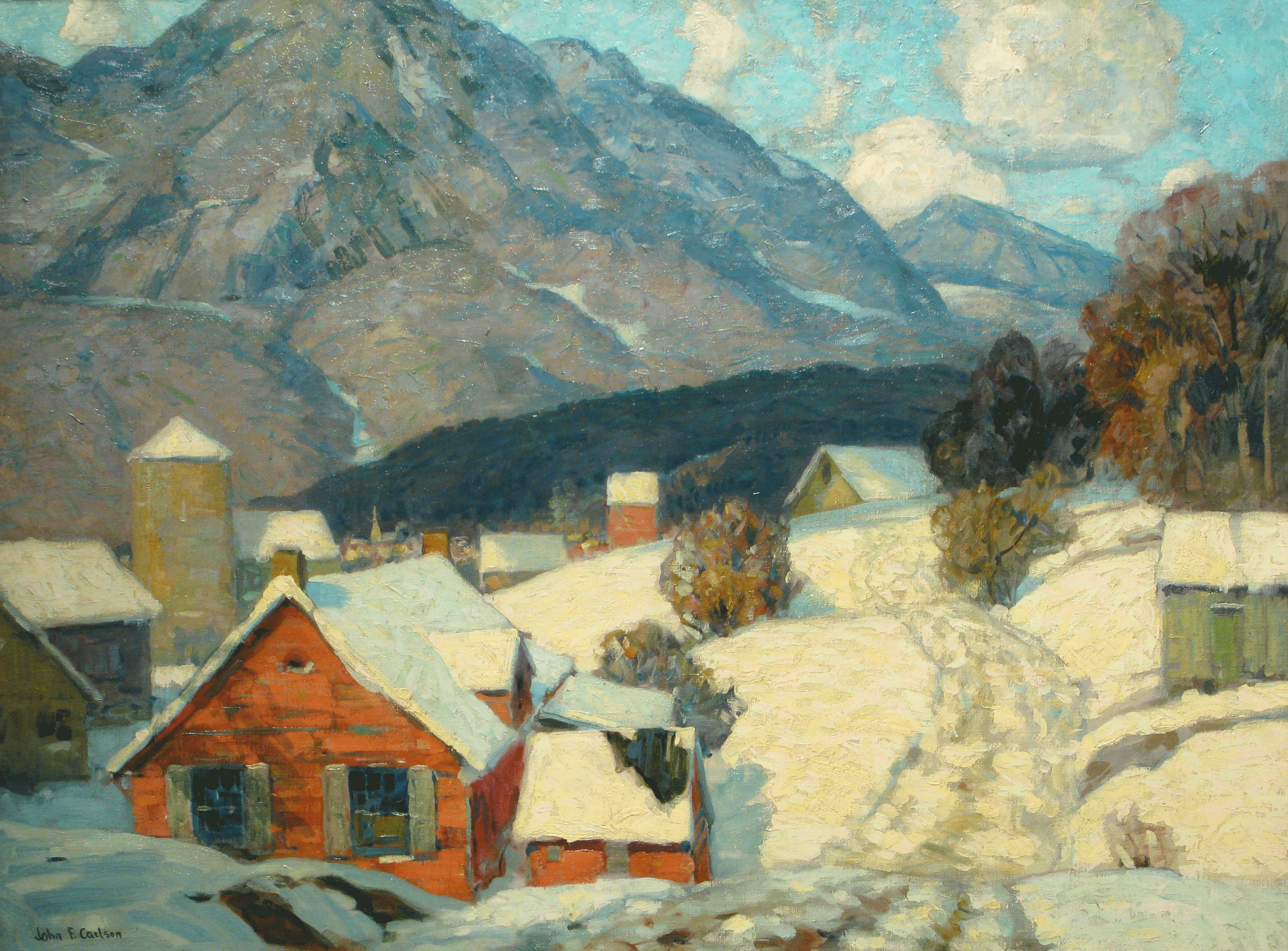
'Mountain Hamlet' by John Fabian Carlson

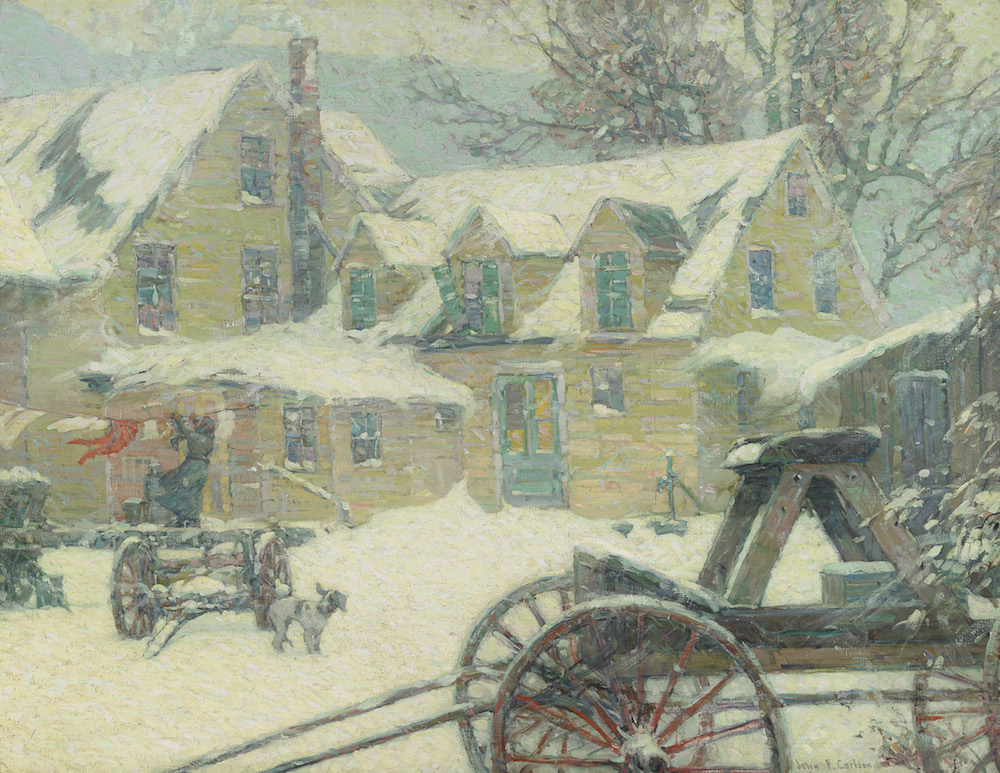
'Winter Caprice' by John Fabian Carlson

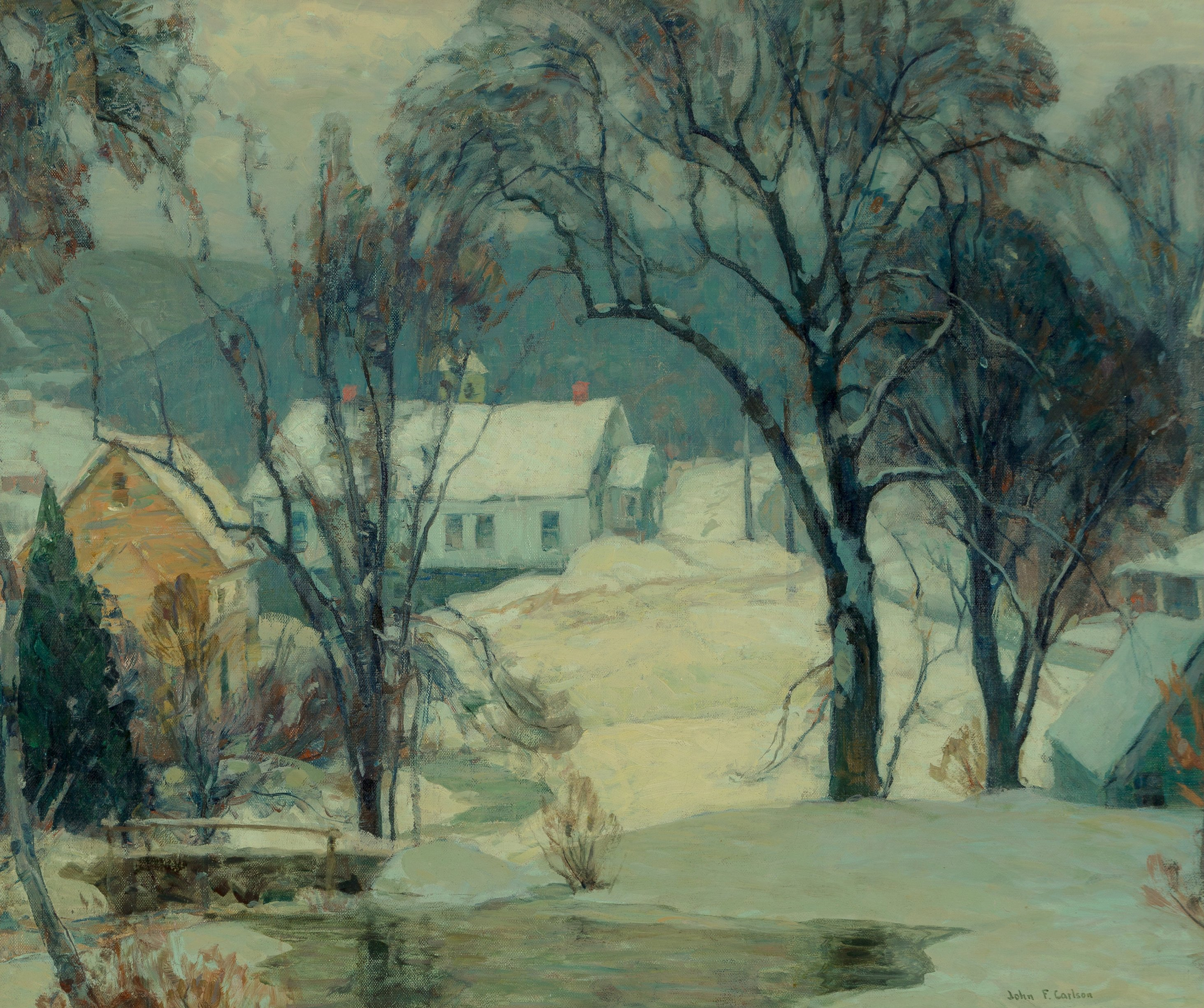
Backyard Lyric by John Fabian Carlson

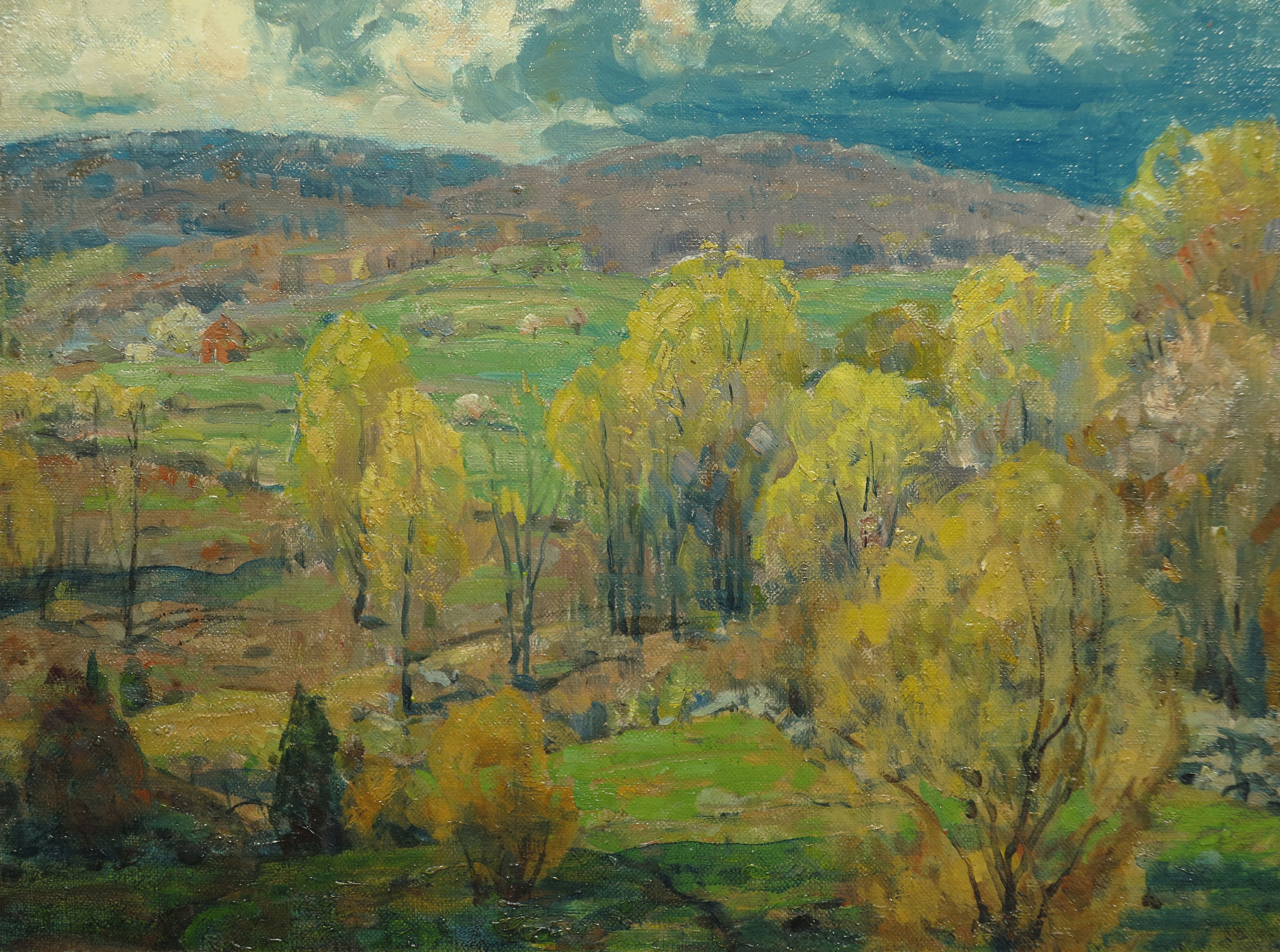
Budding Maples by John Fabian Carlson

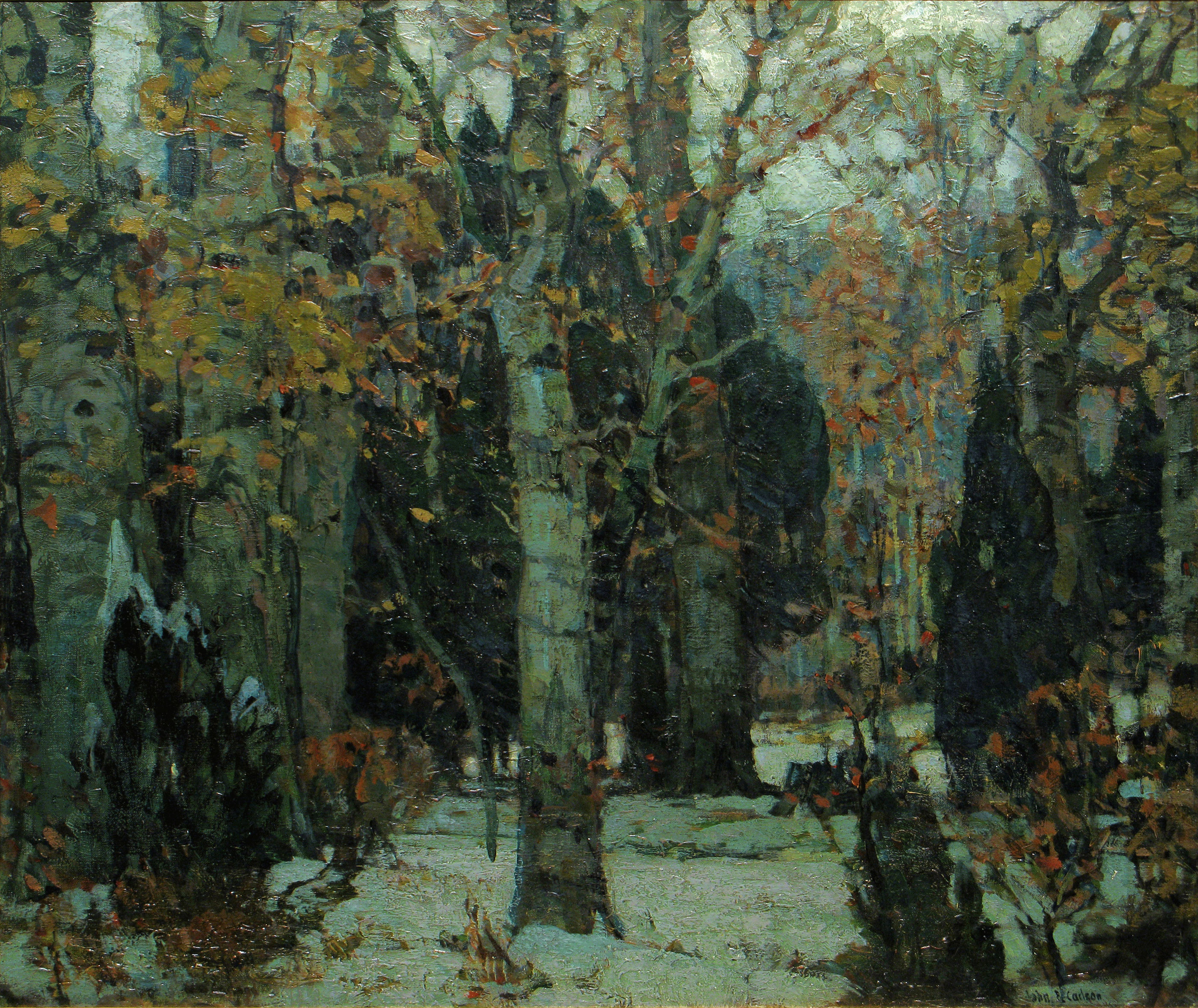
December Woods, Woodstock, New York by John Fabian Carlson

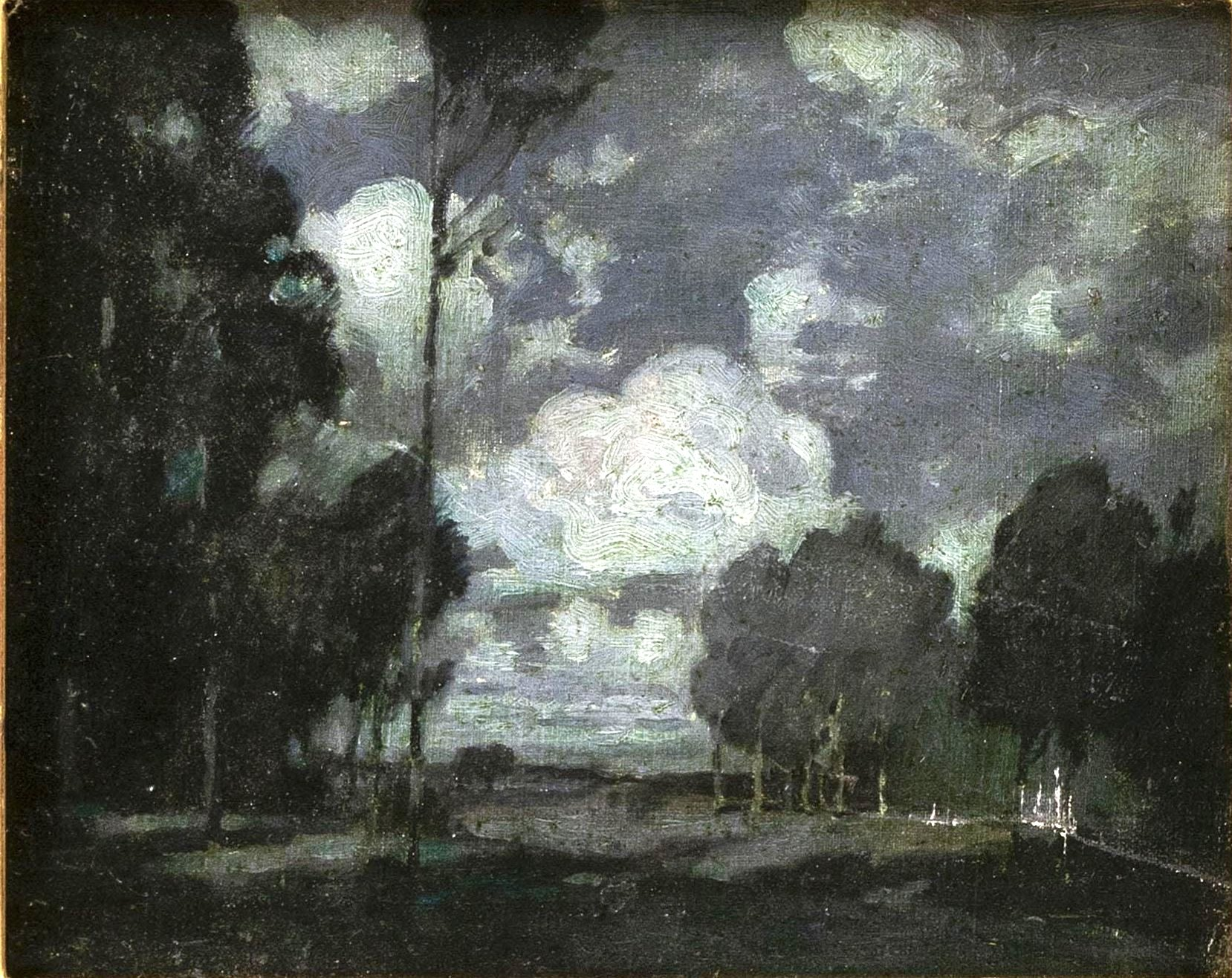
Evening Poetry by John Fabian Carlson

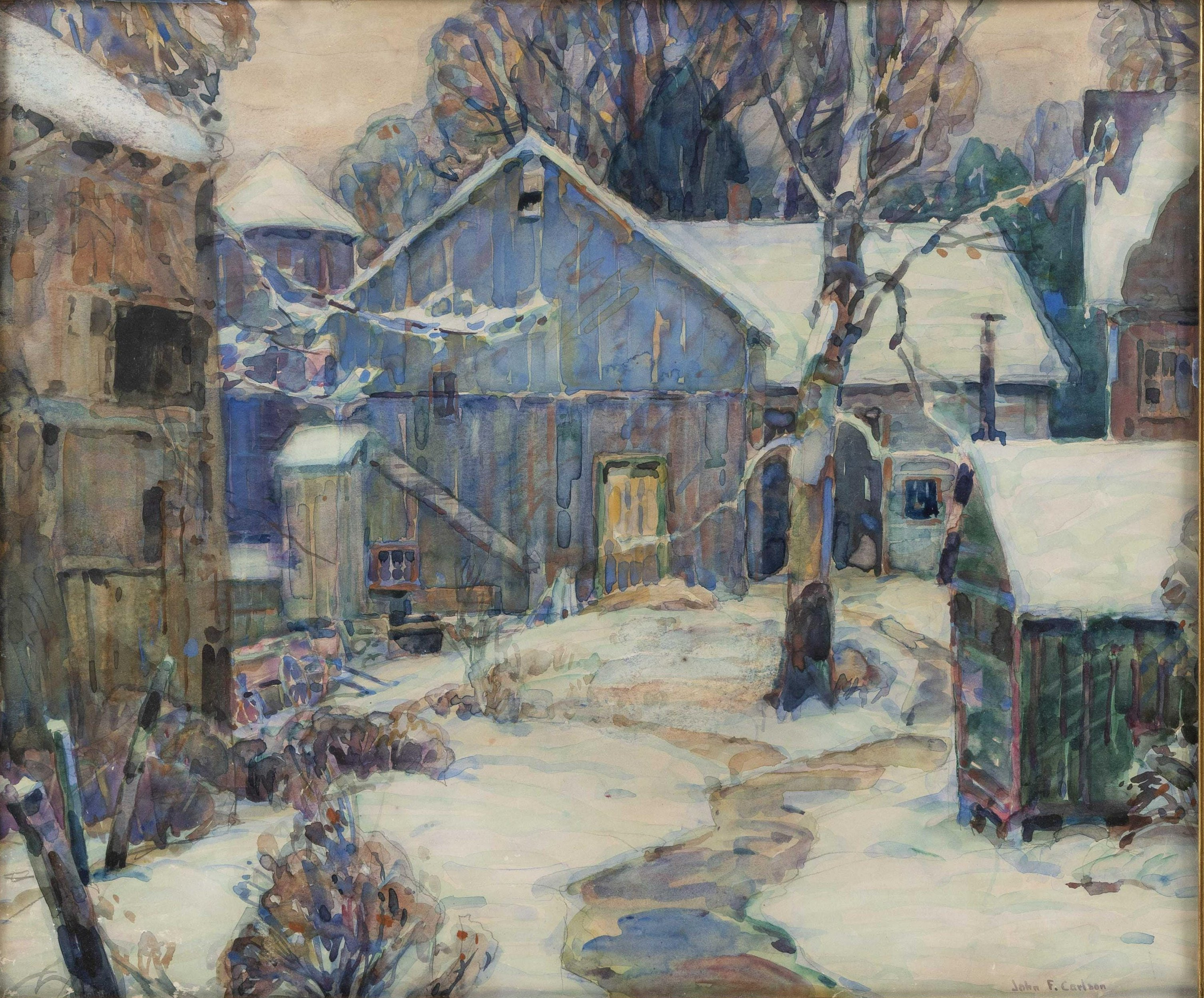
Farm-yard Lyric by John Fabian Carlson, watercolor

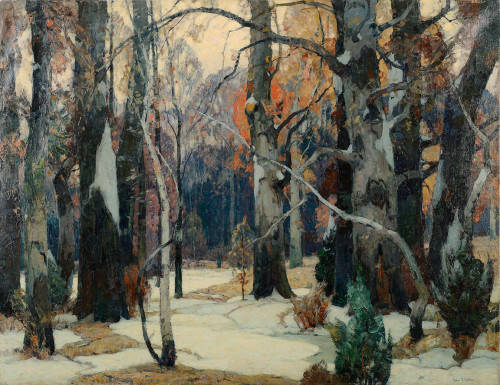
Forest Vistas by John F. Carlson, Palmer Museum of Art

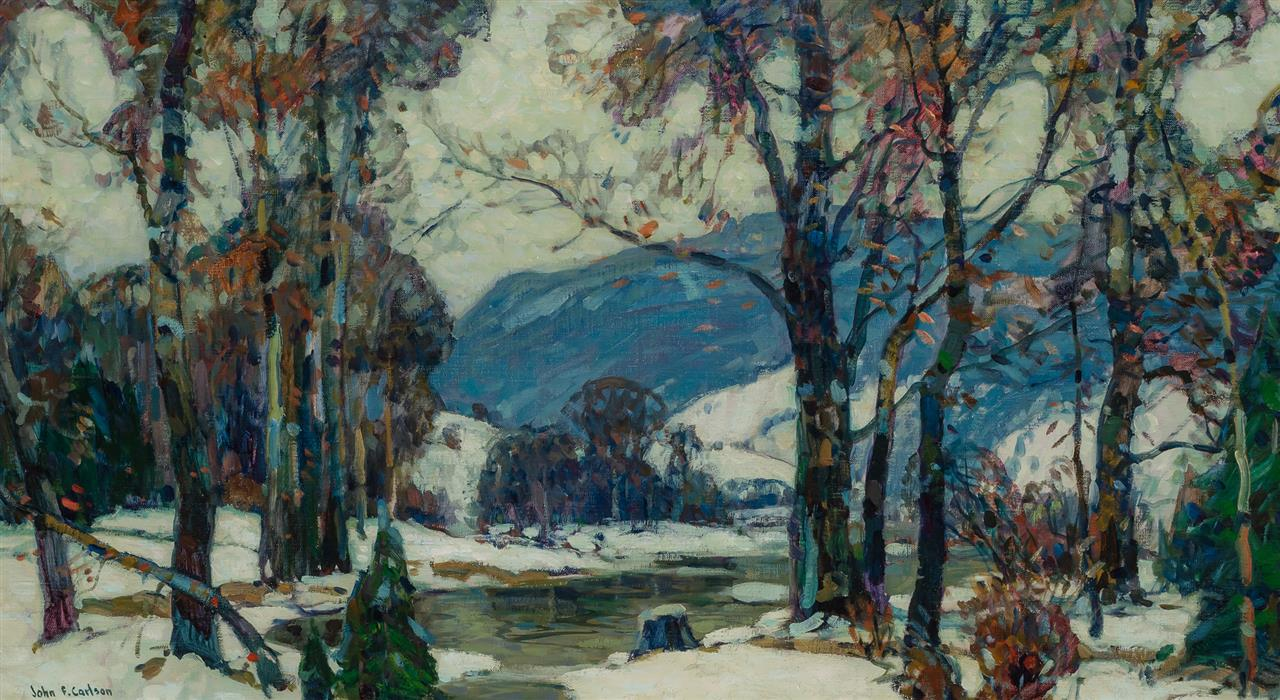
Highland Snows by John Fabian Carlson

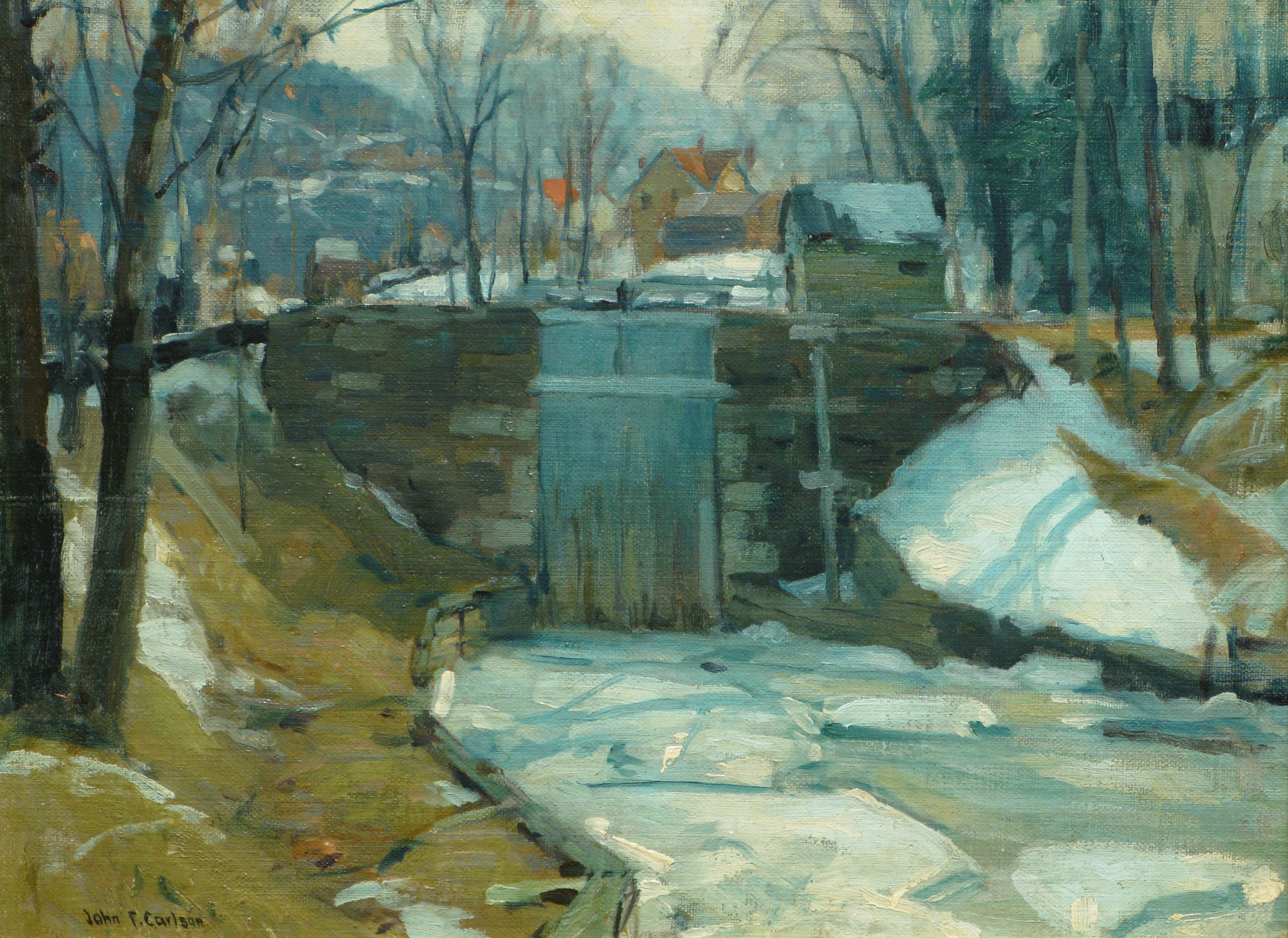
Ice-Bound Locks by John Fabian Carlson

John Fabian Carlson - Autumn Beeches - 1915.1 - Dallas Museum of Art

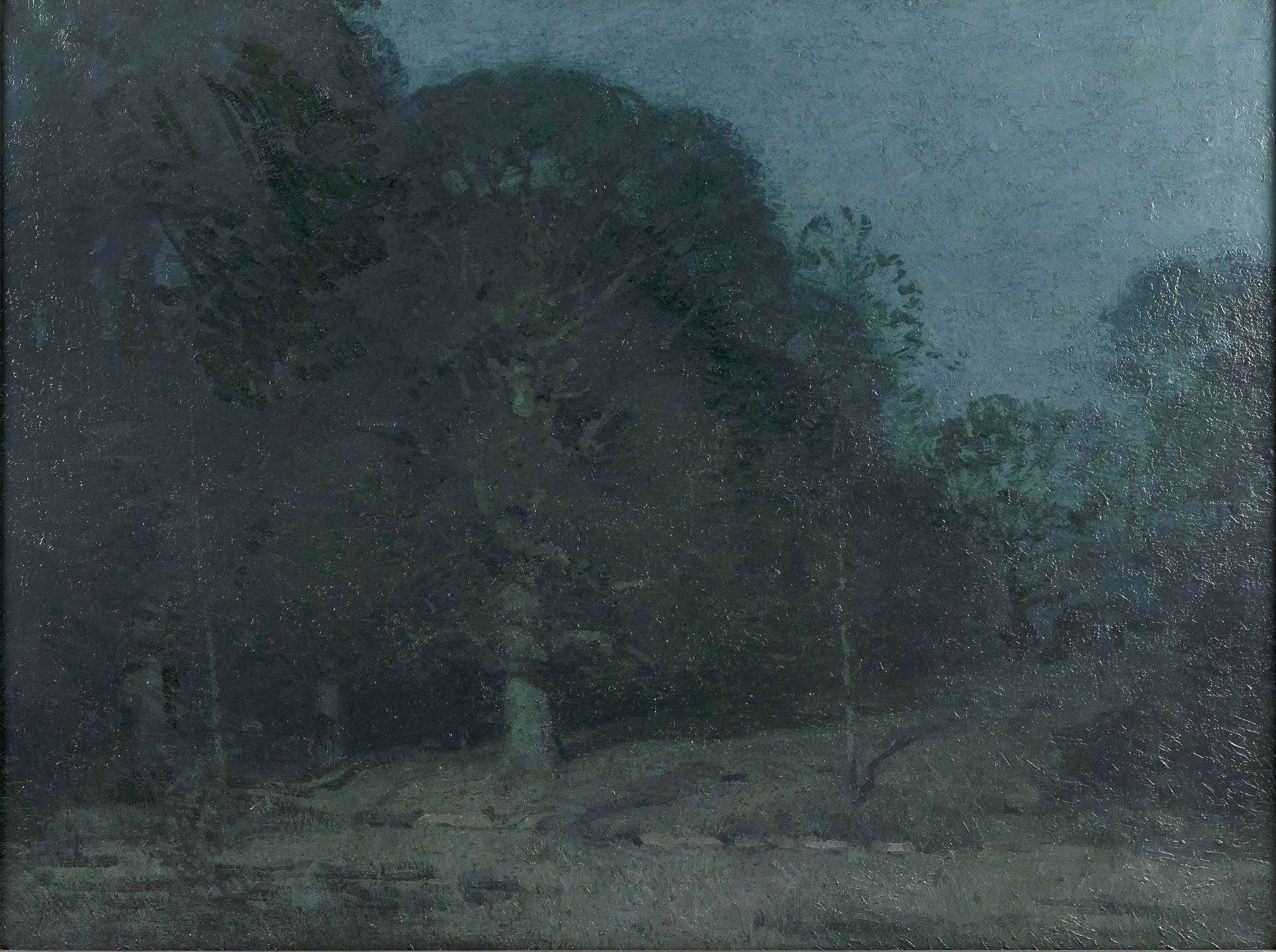
Nocturnal Peace by JOHN FABIAN CARLSON Oil on canvas, 30 x 40

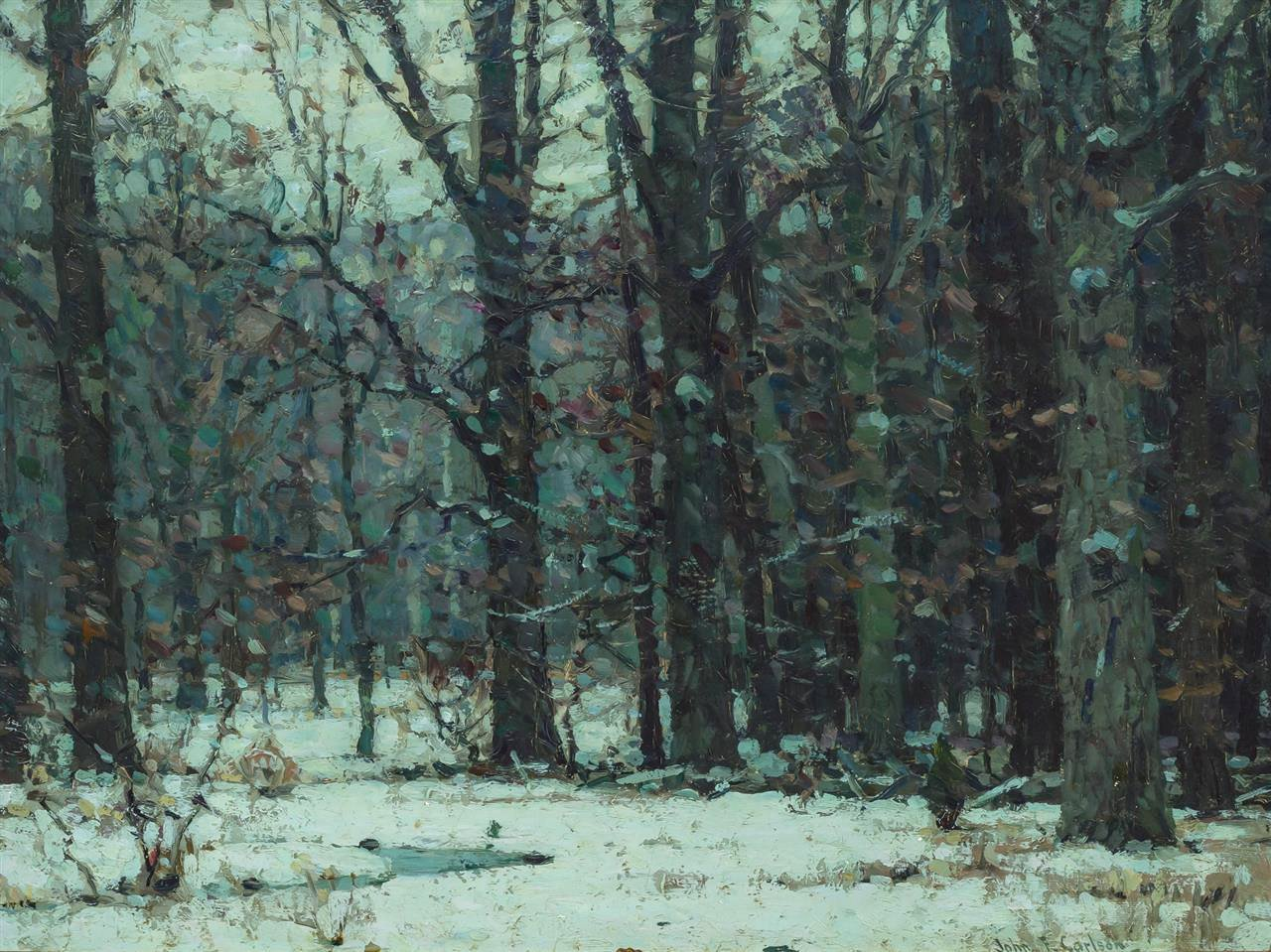
Silent Woods by John Fabian Carlson

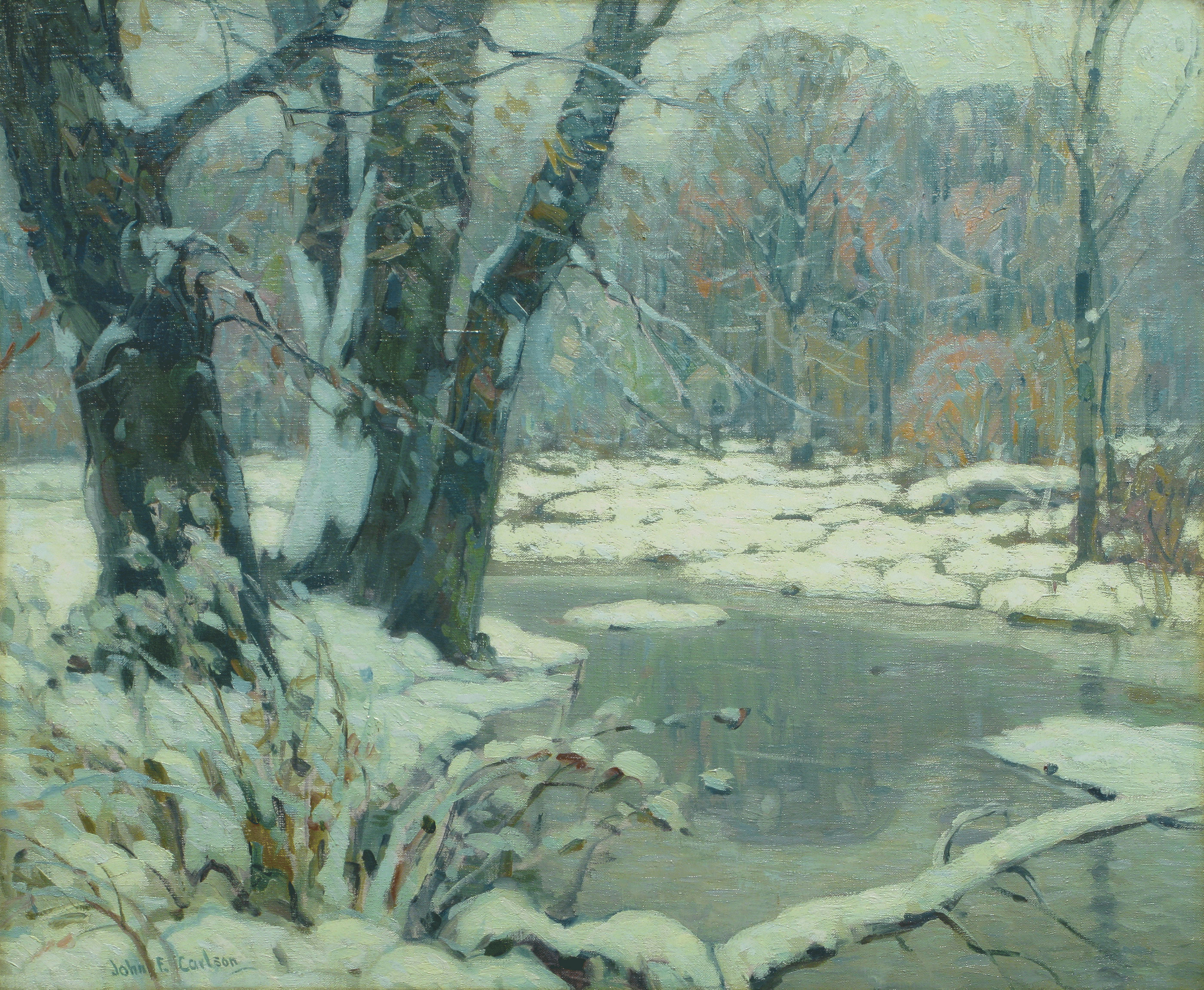
Silvered Brook by John Fabian Carlson

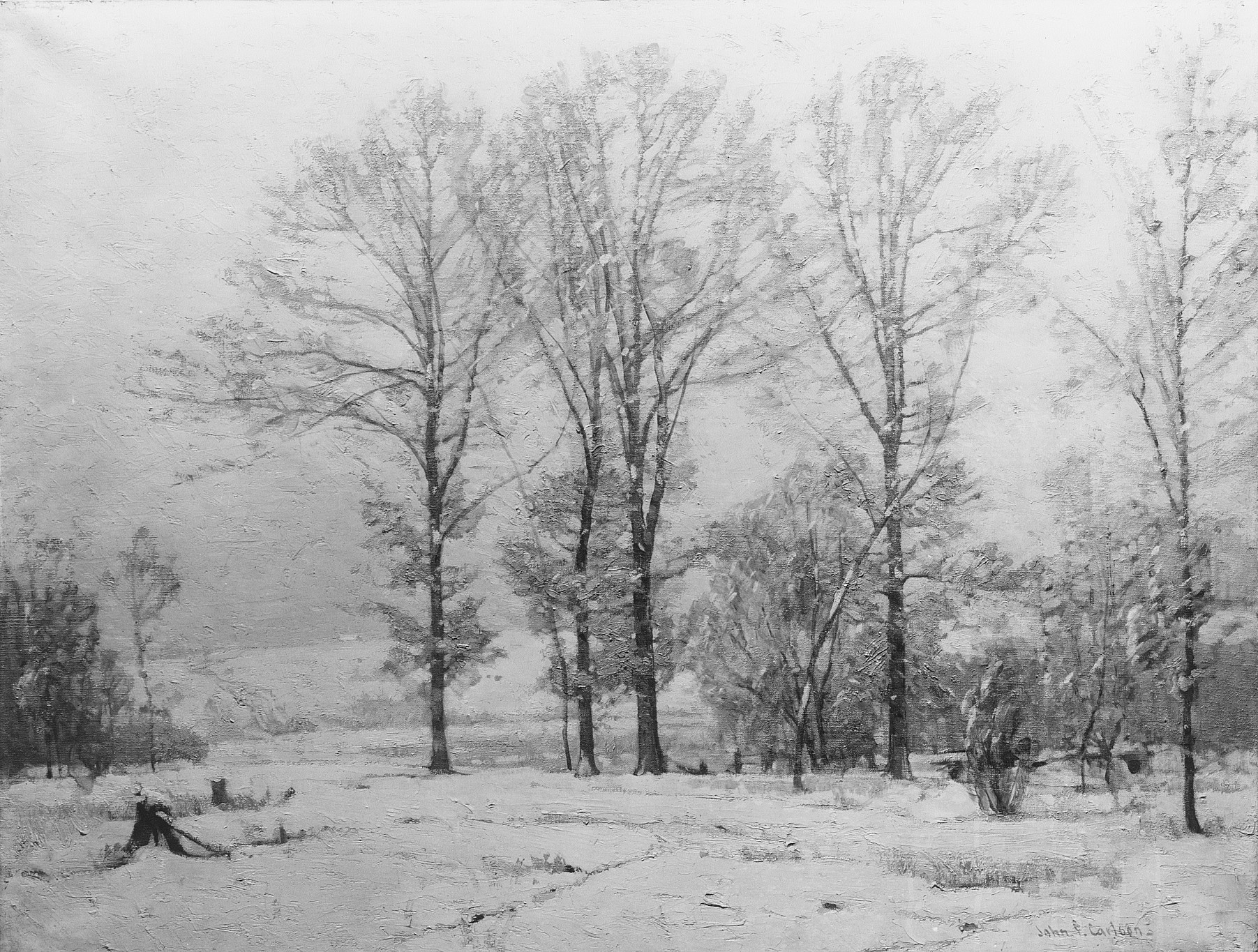
Snow Flurries MET ap47.46

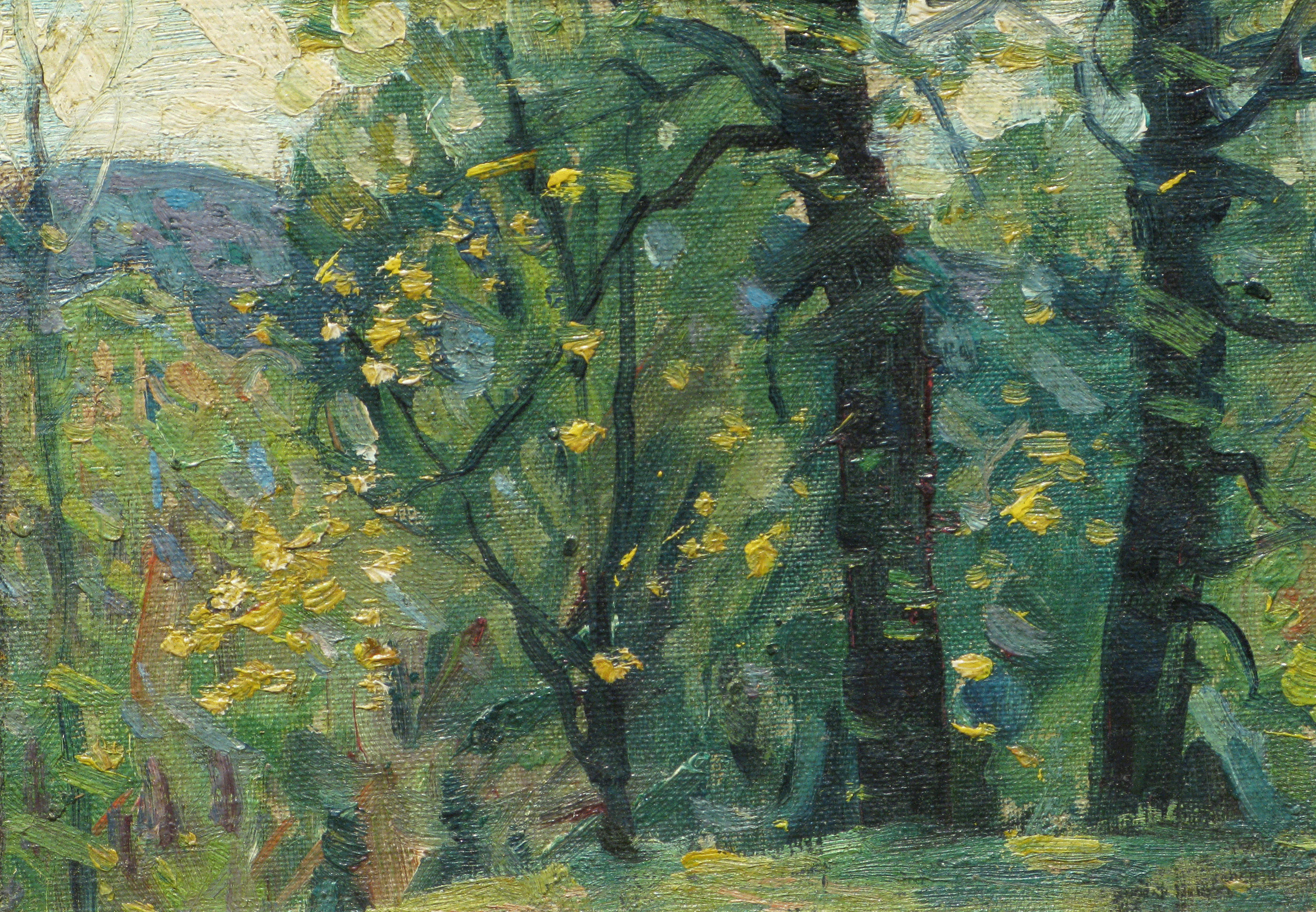
Spring Woods by John Fabian Carlson

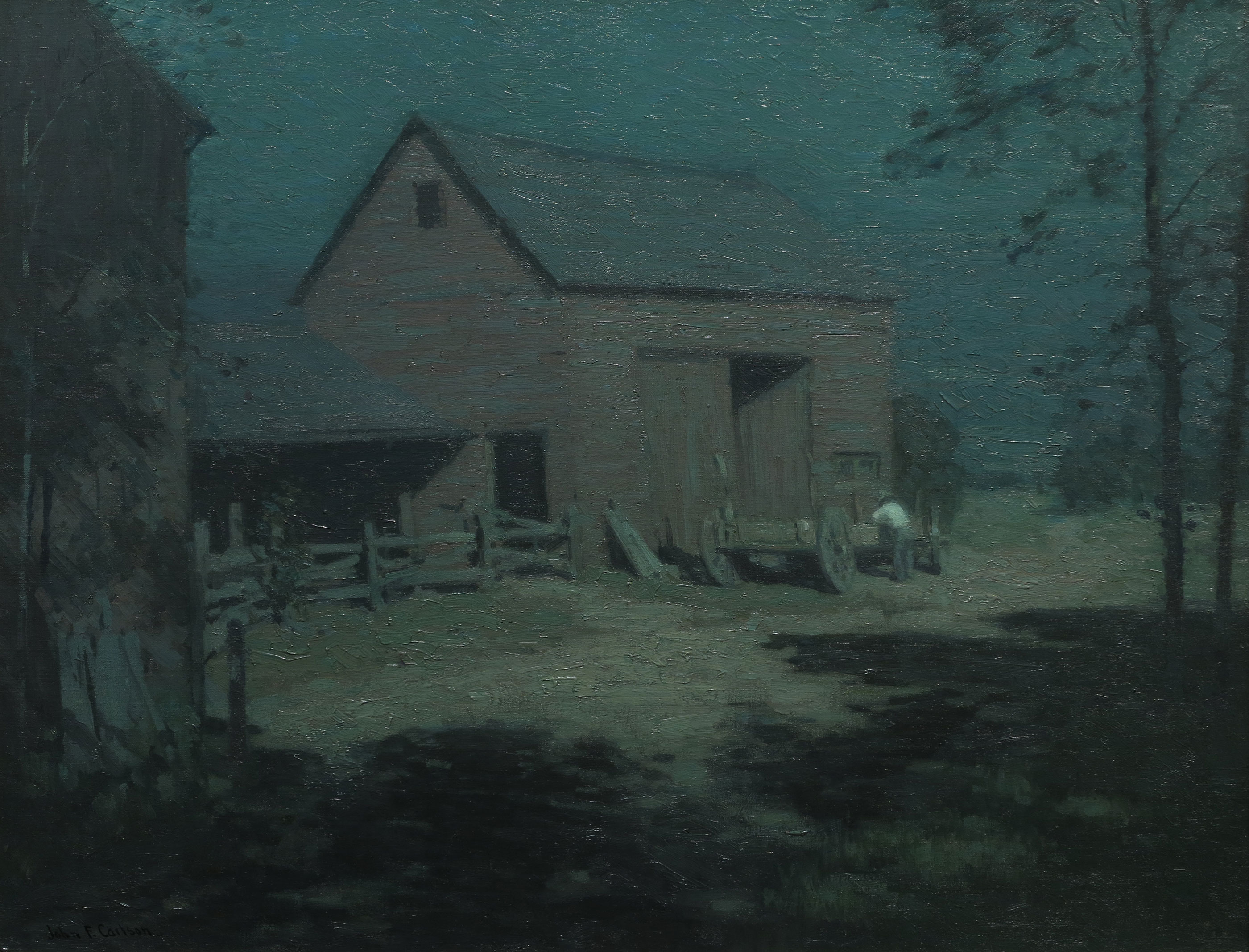
Summer Night, Woodstock, New York by John Fabian Carlson

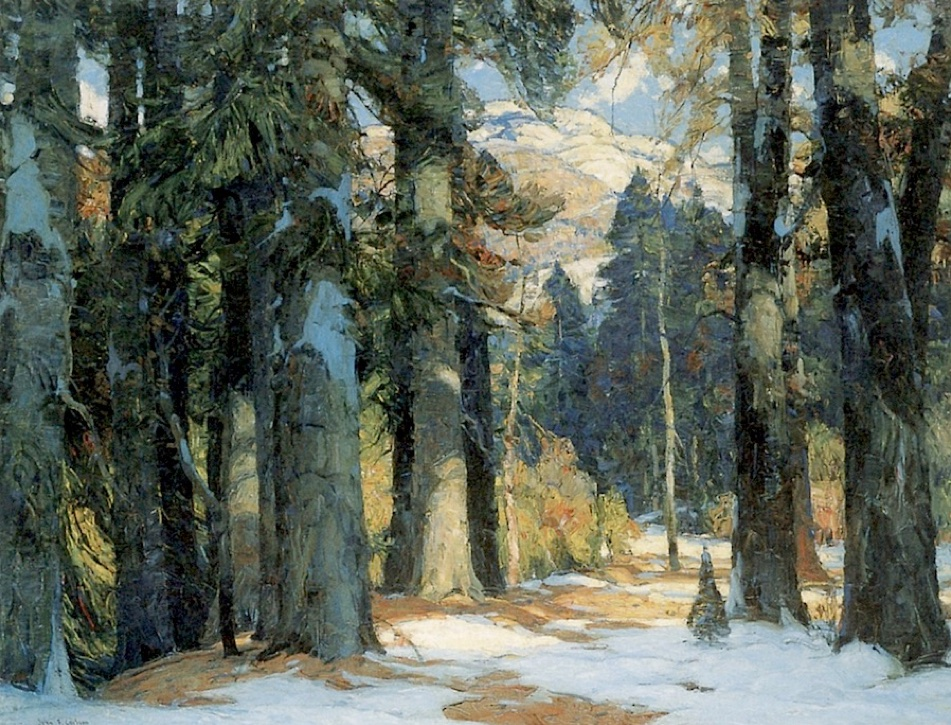
John F. Carlson (1875-1947) Sunlit Isles, 1922 Oil on canvas American Museum of Western Art (Anshutz Collection), Denver

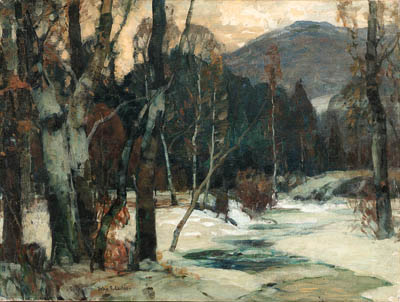
Mountain stream 1999 NYE 08199 0099 000(113250)

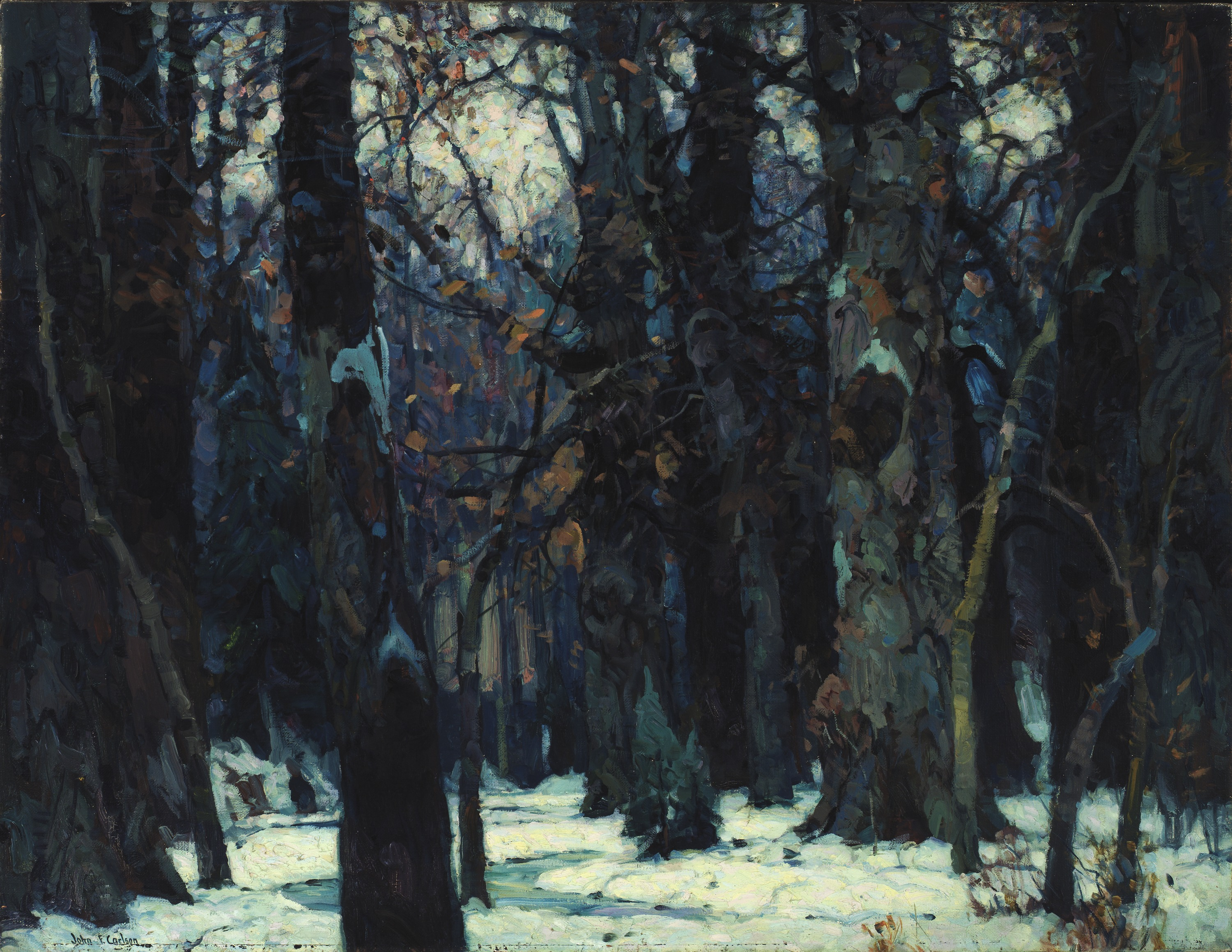
SAAM-1955.10.2 1

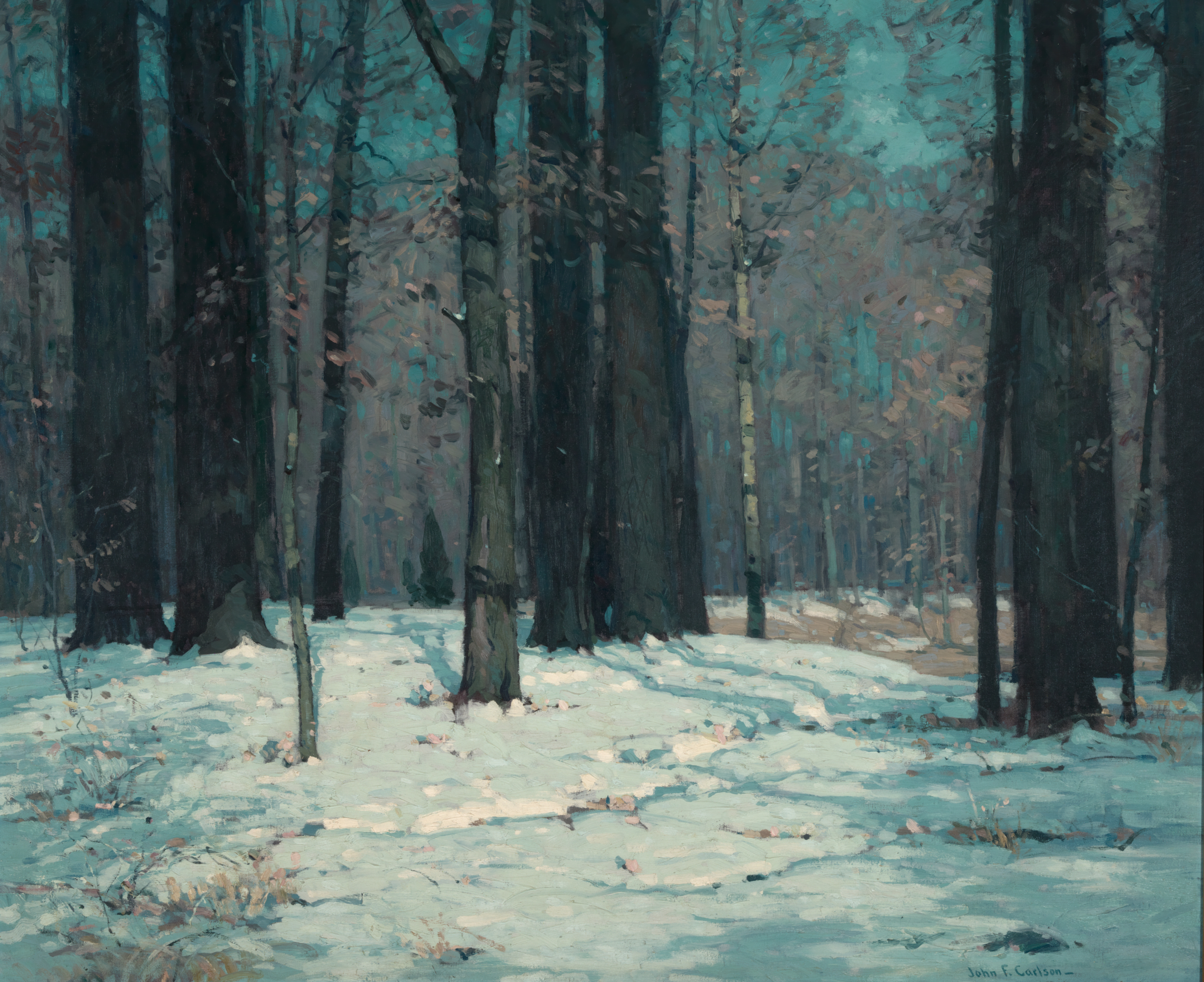
SAAM-2020.20.16 1

== Awards ==
- 1912 Salmagundi Club, Isidor & Vezin prizes
- 1918 National Academy of Design Carnegie Prize.
- 1923 Salmagundi Club, Shaw water-color prize
- 1923 Henry Ward Ranger fund purchase prize

== Collections ==
- Allen Memorial Art Museum, Oberlin College, Ohio
- Baltimore Museum and of Fine Arts, Maryland
- Birger Sandzen Memorial Gallery, Kansas
- The Butler Art Institute, Ohio
- Brigham Young University Museum of Art, Utah
- Brooks Memorial Gallery, Tennessee
- Carnegie Institute, Pittsburg, Pennsylvania
- Corcoran Gallery of Art, Washington D.C.
- Dallas Museum of Art, Texas
- Dallas Public Library, Texas
- Fort Worth Art Association, Texas
- Georgia Museum of Art, University of Georgia, Georgia
- Lincoln Art Association, Nebraska
- Metropolitan Museum of Art, New York
- Michele and Donald D’Amour Museum of Fine Arts, Massachusetts
- National Academy of Design, New York
- Oberlin College Collection, Ohio
- Randolph-Macon College, Virginia
- Reading Public Museum, Pennsylvania
- Sheldon Museum of Art, Nebraska
- Smithsonian American Art Museum, Washington DC
- The Parthenon, Tennessee
- The Phillips Collection, Washington DC
- The San Diego Museum of Art, California
- The Toledo Museum of Art, Ohio
- Virginia Institute of Fine Arts, Virginia
- Washington County Museum of Fine Arts, Maryland
- Woodstock Artists Association Museum, New York

== Published writings ==
- 1928 Elementary Principles of Landscape Painting, National Publishing Society, Mountain Lake Park, Maryland
- 1953 Carlson's Guide to Landscape Painting, Sterling Publishing, NY, reprinted multiple times.

== Personal life ==
He married fellow artist Margaret Goddard on April 19, 1913, in Plainfield, NJ. They had three sons. He died at age 69 on March 20, 1945. He passed away in a Manhattan, New York Hospital following a six-week illness, and is buried in Woodstock Artist Cemetery, Woodstock, Ulster County, NY.
