= Edwin Boyd Johnson =

American painter, designer, muralist and photographer

- Born: 1904; Watertown, Tennessee
- Died: 1968 (aged 63–64); Nashville, Tennessee

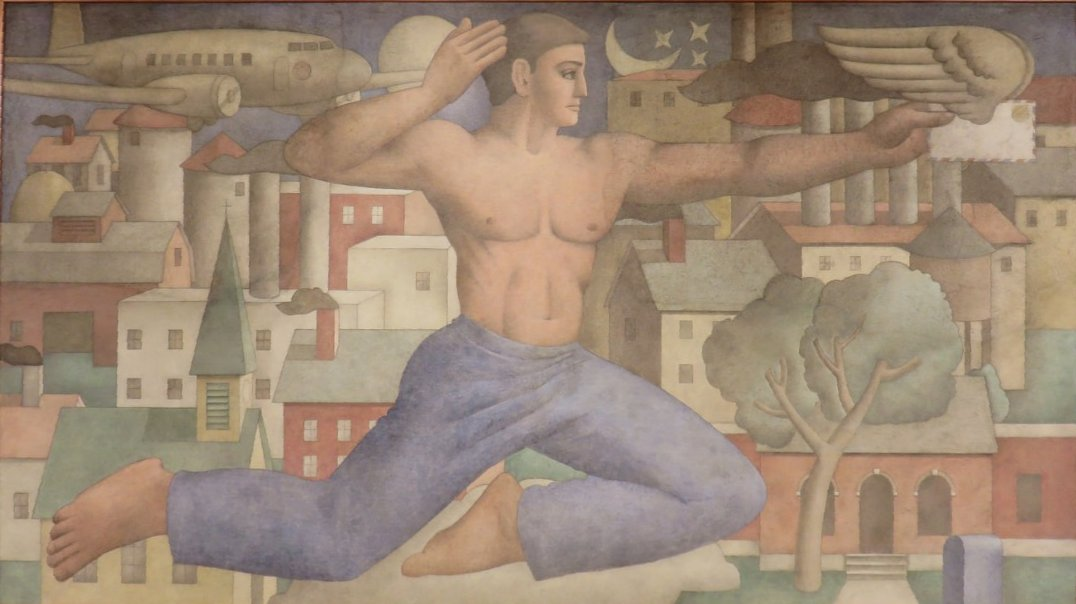
Airmail, a fresco painted by Johnson in 1937

Edwin Boyd Johnson (November 4, 1904 – August 6, 1968) was an American painter, designer, muralist and photographer.

Edwin Boyd Johnson was born on November 4, 1904, in Watertown, Tennessee,. Not long thereafter, the family moved to Nashville, Tennessee, where he attended grade and high school. After graduating, he enrolled in the School of the Art Institute of Chicago (1925-1930). He also studied at the National Academy of Design in New York City. The Bryan Lathrop Foreign Traveling Scholarship of $1500 (1931) enabled him to study fresco painting at the Kunstgewerbeschule in Vienna, the Atelier de Fresque of Paris, and the Ecole Egyptienne des Beaux Arts in Alexandria, Egypt.

He was a member of the Chicago Society of Artists, and during the 1930s and early 1940s, he participated in many of their exhibits. He was the recipient of several awards, among them the Joseph N. Eisendrath Prize for "Nude" in 1938 and, in 1940, the William M.R. French Memorial Gold Medal from the Art Institute Alumni Association for his painting "Mother and Child". As a participant in the government's Alaskan project, he painted pictures of that state to promote protection of the wilderness. One of those, "Mt. Kimball", hangs in the Anchorage Museum at Rasmuson Center.

While Johnson painted in both water colors and oils, he is best known for his murals, which were funded by the WPA Federal Art Project. These include the recently restored Airmail, in the Melrose Park Library (Chicago, 1937), The Old Days, in the Tuscola, Illinois, post office (1941), People of the Soil in Dickson, Tennessee, which, although photographed for the 1996 book Tennessee Post Office Murals, is no longer open to view. and the City Hall mural in Sioux Falls, SD (1936).

He was an honorary member of the United States Armed Forces in World War II.

After the war he took up residence in Mexico City, where he turned his artistic focus to photography.

He died in 1968 in Nashville.
