= Aaron Bohrod =

American painter

- Born: 21 November 1907; Chicago, Illinois, US
- Died: 3 April 1992 (aged 84); Monona, Wisconsin, US
- Education: School of the Art Institute of Chicago; Art Students League of New York
- Known for: painter
- Movement: Regionalism/Social realism Magic realism Trompe-l'œil
- Awards: Guggenheim Fellowship (Fine Arts, 1936)

Aaron Bohrod (21 November 1907 – 3 April 1992) was an American artist best known for his trompe-l'œil still-life paintings.

== Education ==
Bohrod was born in Chicago in 1907, the son of an emigree Bessarabian-Jewish grocer. Bohrod studied at the School of the Art Institute of Chicago and the Art Students League of New York between 1926 and 1930. While at the Art Students League, Bohrod was influenced by John Sloan and chose themes that involved his own surroundings.

== Career ==
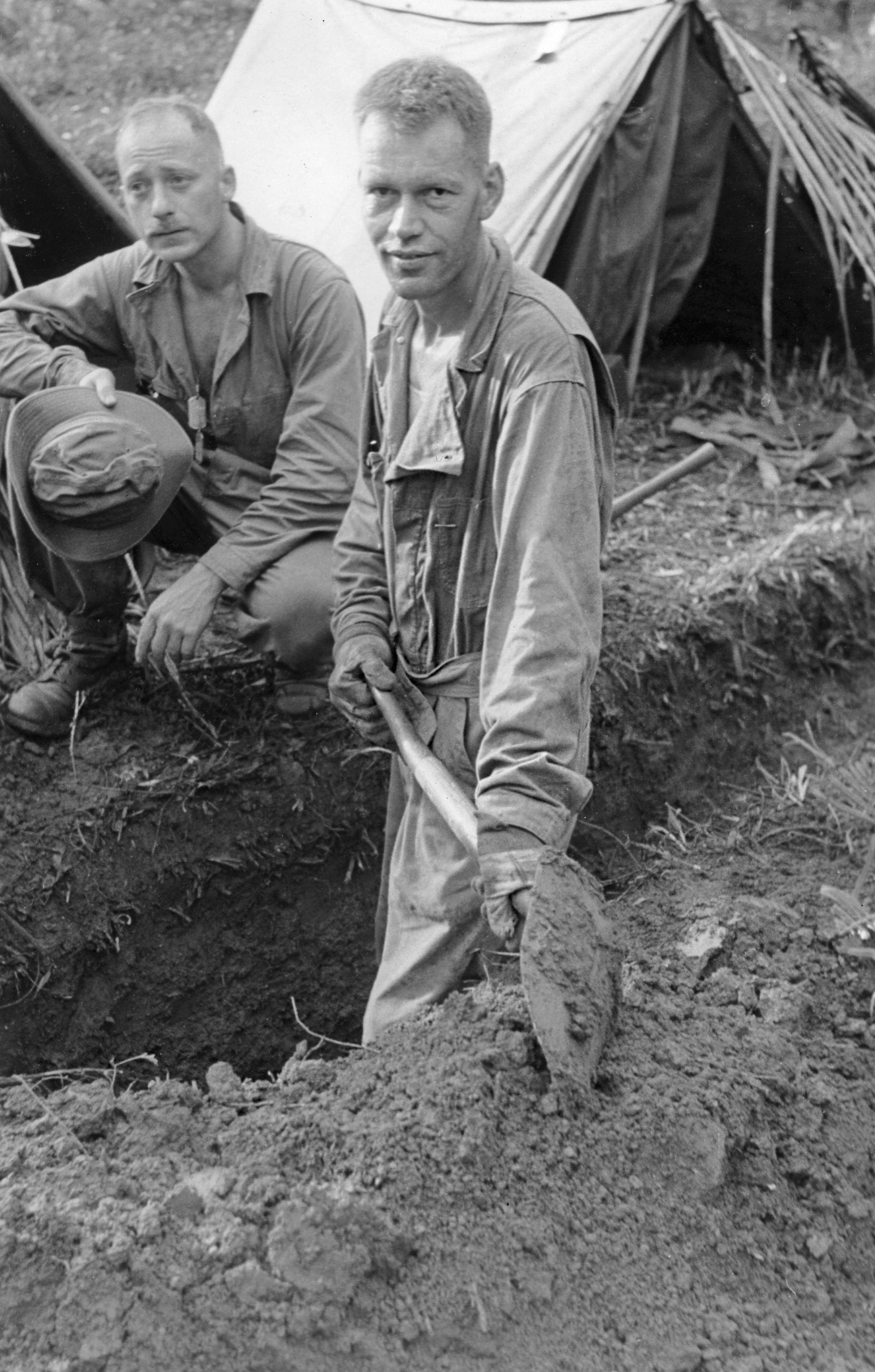
War artists Bohrod (left) and Howard Cook with the U.S. Army on Rendova Island, June 1943

He returned to Chicago in 1930 where he painted views of the city and its working class. He eventually earned Guggenheim Fellowships which permitted him to travel throughout the country, painting and recording the American scene. His early work won him widespread praise as an important social realist and regional painter and printmaker and his work was marketed through Associated American Artists in New York. Bohrod completed three commissioned murals for the Treasury Departments Section of Fine Arts in Illinois; Vandalia in 1935, Galesburg in 1938 and Clinton in 1939. During World War II, Bohrod worked as an artist; first in the Pacific for the United States Army Corps of Engineers' War Art Unit, then in Europe for Life magazine. In 1948, he accepted a position as artist in residence, succeeding John Steuart Curry, at the University of Wisconsin–Madison, and remained in that capacity until 1973. (Both artists contributed to the Rivers of America book series.) In 1951, Bohrod was elected into the National Academy of Design as an Associate member, and became a full member in 1953. He died from liver cancer at his home near Madison, Wisconsin on 3 April 1992, at the age of 84.

=== Trompe-l'œil ===
In the 1950s, Bohrod developed the trompe-l'œil style of highly realistic, detailed still-life paintings which give an illusion of real life. It was this style with which he became internationally identified.

== Works ==
Bohrod's America, its history

Bohrod's works can be found in the collections of many American museums such as the Art Institute of Chicago, the Metropolitan Museum of Art, the Whitney Museum of American Art in New York, and the Hirshhorn Museum in Washington, D.C. The Aaron Bohrod Gallery at the University of Wisconsin–Fox Valley was named in his honor.

== Bibliography ==
- Bohrod, Aaron (1959). A Pottery Sketchbook. University of Wisconsin Press.
- Bohrod, Aaron (1966). A Decade of Still Life. University of Wisconsin Press. ISBN 978-0-299-04121-2.
