= Gustaf Dalstrom =

Swedish-American painter

- Born: January 18, 1893; Gotland, Sweden
- Died: 1971 (aged 77–78)
- Education: Art Institute of Chicago
- Known for: Painting, Etching, Watercolor
- Notable work: The Great Indian Council - 1833

Gustaf Dalstrom (1893–1971) was an American artist and muralist. From 1927, he served as president of the Chicago Society of Artists. During the Great Depression he contributed several mural paintings to public schools and post offices through the Treasury Department Section of Painting and Sculpture (later called The Treasury Section of Fine Arts). One of his murals that can still be viewed today is The Great Indian Council - 1833. The mural was originally featured in 1938, paired with a mural his wife, Frances Foy, created in The Old Main Post Office of Chicago. The Great Indian Council - 1833 can be viewed in the current location of the South Loop Post Office in Chicago, Illinois.

== Early life ==
Gustaf Dalstrom was born January 18, 1893, in Gotland, Sweden and died in Chicago, 1971. He attended Lane Technical High School in Chicago and went to college at the Art Institute of Chicago. There, he studied under George Bellows and Randall Davey (1887-1964), two prominent artists of that time. In his time at the Art Institute of Chicago, he received the Logan Award and Gold Medal for excellence. After attending college, Dalstrom painted in Sweden, France, Italy and Germany and focused on oil, watercolor, and graphic mediums of art.

== Works ==
Dalstrom was the supervisor for the mural division and administrator for the Illinois Federal Art Project. As a supervisor, he met with potential sponsors to discuss ideas and potential artists to discuss logistics before any work had begun. Since Dalstrom was an established artist, he did not contribute work for relief. He was featured in numerous exhibitions during the twenties and all throughout the Great Depression. His artwork was shown at: The Art Institute of Chicago, Annual Exhibit of Chicago and Vicinity Artists sixteen times between 1919 and 1945; Annual Exhibition of American Artists, seven times between 1921 and 1937; The Ten Chicago, circa 1920 to 1940; International Watercolor Exhibition, 1929 to 1935; and he was the Illinois State director for the WPA/FAP Increase Robinson's gallery in Chicago. He also had many one-man exhibitions from 1933 to 1935 and served on staff of the Chicago Field Museum of Natural History as well.

=== Murals ===
Dalstrom completed many murals to support the New Deal's Section of Fine Arts in Illinois and Missouri. Murals he created are: five for a public school, one for Highland Park, Chicago, and one for the De Kalb Public Library in De Kalb, Illinois. The mural for the De Kalb Library, completed in 1934, was critically acclaimed to be one of the finest mural designs shown in the last Chicago PWA exhibition May 20, 1934. He also painted 9 murals for the state hospital in Manteno, Illinois and three more for Illinois Post Offices. One mural for a post office in Herrin, Illinois from 1940, was entitled, George Rogers Clark Conferring With Indians Near Herrin. Another mural was The Great Indian Council - 1833. in 1938, commissioned by the Section of Fine Arts for the Chestnut Street Post Office, where it hung opposite the mural by his wife, Frances Foy. An additional mural, The History of Transportation, painted in 1937 for the Lawson School in Chicago, Il and now on display at a law office in the NBC Building, is attributed to Dahlstrom due to stylistic similarities and his active participation in the Chicago WPA program. The signature was removed during restoration.

== The Great Indian Council-1833 ==
The Great Indian Council - 1833, was a painting originally commissioned for the Chestnut Street Post Office at 840 North Clark Street. It was commissioned in 1934, through the Treasury Department Section of Painting and Sculpture and is a five-foot-by-fifteen-foot oil painting, on canvas. It was originally paired with Dalstrom's wife, Frances Foy's mural painting titled Advent of the Pioneers. The scene shows a group of Native Americans sitting and some standing, listening to their leader. Both murals were removed from the Chestnut Street Post Office in the 1980s when it was converted into a movie theater. Frances Foy's mural was put into storage in 2001 and in 2002, The Great Indian Council - 1833 was treated beginning in 1999 to 2002, at The Chicago Conservation Center. It was restored in the Main Post Office sometime before 1995. It was stated that both murals would be hung in the Main Post Office on 433 West Van Buren Street, but the US Postal Service vacated the Van Buren building in 1995. The Main Post Office, now known as the Old Chicago Main Post Office, was bought by Bill Davies for seventeen million dollars on October 21, 2009. As a consequence The Great Indian Council - 1833 had to be moved yet again because the US Postal Service owns the murals and is required to care for them.

=== Subject ===
The subject of The Great Indian Council - 1833 was the Treaty of Chicago, which was signed September 26, 1833. Illinois had entered the union as the twenty-first state and southern Illinois had been settled in by the frontier settlers. Northern Illinois was still inhabited by Native American tribes by this time from 1818. The Black Hawk War of 1832 terrified Northern settlers and they wanted to claim northern Illinois as their own. The Chicago Treaty, also known as the Great Indian Council, stated that the Potawatomi, Chippewa, and the Ottawa Native American tribes had three years to leave their territory from the Rock River in Illinois to the Grand River in Michigan and One hundred thousand dollars as well. These three tribes were the last Native Americans to leave Illinois. The Native Americans did not agree to leave until 1833.

=== Location ===
The Great Indian Council - 1833 can be viewed in the lobby of the Loop Station Post Office, located at 211 South Clark Street. Its original pair, Advent of the Pioneers, can be viewed at the post office located at 433 West Harrison Street. It is unknown why the two murals are not paired together today.
