= Chicago: Epoch of a Great City =

Mural by Harry Sternberg in Chicago, Illinois

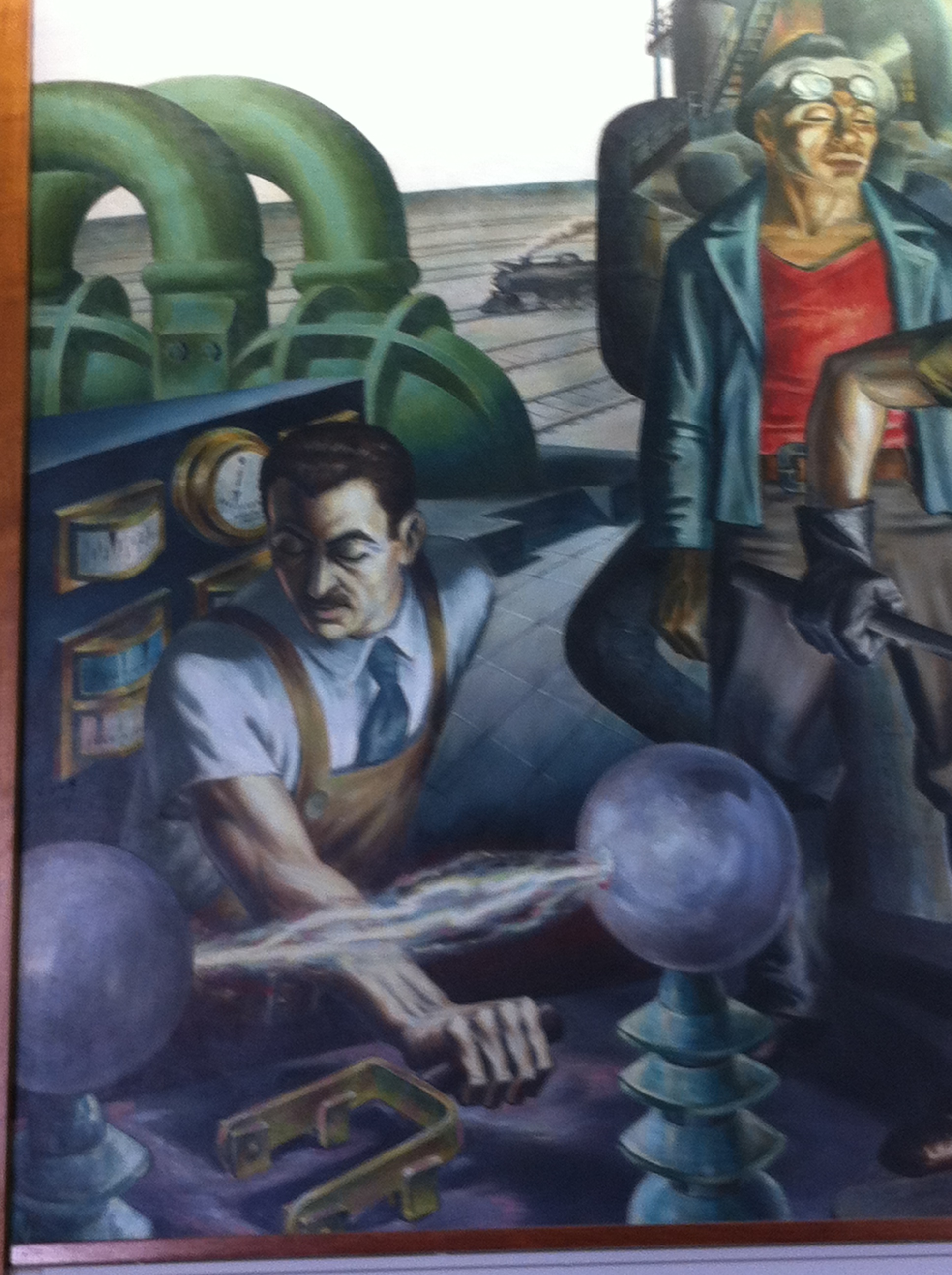
Muralist, Harry Sternberg, depicting a scientist in his mural "Chicago:Epoch of a Great City"

Chicago: Epoch of a Great City by Harry Sternberg is a post office mural oil on canvas that measures 24 feet 2 inches by 7 feet 7 inches. It was created in 1938. It hangs in the Lakeview Post Office located at 1343 West Irving Park Road in Chicago's North side.

Harry Sternberg created the painting to show the four great industries of Chicago; steel, electric power, the stockyards and farm-equipment manufacturing. The painted also showed the different stages of the city's growth. In the middle was a recreation of the great Chicago fire of 1871. Above it shows a vibrant city emerging, the modern day Chicago. Showing the strength of agriculture as well as the steel industry in Chicago. The different trains emerging from the city show the different phases and growth of the rail system in Chicago. Charles Keller was the assistant in making the mural.

Due to years of exposure, the painting was in need of some touch ups. In 2003, David Baldwin and his wife formed a group called "Friends of the Lakeview Post Office Mural", which raised money to have it repaired and cleaned. Parma Conservation of Chicago completed the work in 2003.

Harry Sternberg's first noted Mural was "Carrying the Mail".
