= Wellington J. Reynolds =

American painter

Wellington Jarard Reynolds (April 9, 1865, in New Lenox, Illinois – 1949) was a well-known Chicago portrait painter and art instructor at the Art Institute of Chicago. Educated in Chicago, Munich, and Paris, he was awarded medals for his work at the Paris Salon as well as in juried exhibitions in the United States.

== Life and career ==
Reynolds was born on the family farm in New Lenox, Illinois, the youngest of eight children, only three of whom survived childhood. He was an artistically gifted young man and overcame hardship in order to study art. In 1885 he enrolled in the Chicago Academy of Design, which eventually became the Art Institute of Chicago which relied on the French Beaux-Arts curriculum. He was awarded first prize by the Antiques Department of the school in 1887 and a scholarship for the following term. However, before accepting his award, he married and he and his wife Frances departed for Munich where a number of the American artists studied. The couple had a boy named Ralph Reynolds. Reynolds entered the Royal Academy in Munich and studied privately with the artist Simon Hollósy. When Frances Reynolds became ill, the family returned to the Midwest where she died in 1889. Soon afterward, Reynolds returned to Munich and records indicate that he had his young son with him. Reynolds met Virginia Richmond Keeney, a young Chicago miniature painter. The pair were married in Munich shortly before the two artists left for Paris to further their studies.

In Paris Wellington J. Reynolds studied at the Académie Julian where he studied under Jean-Paul Laurens and Jean-Joseph Benjamin-Constant. Reynolds passed the difficult concours for admittance to the Ecole de Beaux Arts, the official French national academy.

== See also ==
- Art Institute of Chicago
- Decorative Impressionism
- American Impressionism
- Carl Werntz
