= List of New Deal murals =

Wall art produced with U.S. government funding during Great Depression

The List of New Deal murals is a list of murals created in the United States as part of a federally sponsored New Deal project. This list excludes murals placed in post offices, which are listed in List of United States post office murals. Source is Park and Markowitz's Democratic Vistas unless otherwise specified.

== Alabama ==
Location	Mural title	Image	Artist	Date	Notes	NRHP listed
History Museum of Mobile	Discovery and Building	Discovery_and_building_06643v	John Augustus Walker	1936		
History Museum of Mobile	Education	Education_06645v	John Augustus Walker	1936		
History Museum of Mobile	Military Courage	Military_courage_06644v	John Augustus Walker	1936		
History Museum of Mobile	Transportation	Transportation_06641v	John Augustus Walker	1936		
History Museum of Mobile	Transportation	Transportation_06642v	John Augustus Walker	1936		
History Museum of Mobile	Power of Local Opinion	WPA-Mural-Museum-of-Mobile-3	John Augustus Walker	1936		
History Museum of Mobile	Fraternity	WPA-Mural-Museum-of-Mobile-2	John Augustus Walker	1936		
History Museum of Mobile	Science and Invention	WPA-Mural-Museum-of-Mobile-1	John Augustus Walker	1936		

== Alaska ==
Location	Mural title	Image	Artist	Date	Notes	NRHP listed

== Arizona ==
Location	Mural title	Image	Artist	Date	Notes	NRHP listed

== Arkansas ==
Location	Mural title	Image	Artist	Date	Notes	NRHP listed

== California ==
Location	Mural title	Image	Artist	Date	Notes	NRHP listed
George Washington High School (San Francisco)	Life of Washington		Victor Arnautoff	1936	13 scenes	
Santa Monica Public Library	Invention and Imagination		Stanton Macdonald-Wright	1935		
Coit Tower	Metropolitan Life	17_30_134_coit_tower	Victor Arnautoff	1934		
Coit Tower	California	Coit_Mural_Agriculture	Maxine Albro	1934		
Rincon Center	History of San Francisco (Indians by the Golden Gate)	History_of_San_Francisco_mural_02_by_Anton_Refregier_in_Rincon_Center	Anton Refregier	1948		
Rincon Center	History of San Francisco (Conquistadors Discover the Pacific)	History_of_San_Francisco_mural_"Conquistadors_Discover_the_Pacific"_by_Anton_Refregier_at_Rincon_Annex_Post_Office_located_near_the_Embarcadero_at_101_Spear_Street,_San_Francisco,_California_LCCN2013630290	Anton Refregier	1948		
Rincon Center	History of San Francisco (Preaching and Farming at Mission Delores)	History_of_San_Francisco_mural_"Preaching_and_Farming_at_Mission_Dolores"_by_Anton_Refregier_at_Rincon_Annex_Post_Office_located_near_the_Embarcadero_at_101_Spear_Street,_San_Francisco,_California_LCCN2013630288	Anton Refregier	1948		
Rincon Center	History of San Francisco (Hardships on the Emigrant Trail)	History_of_San_Francisco_mural_"Hardships_on_the_Emigrant_Trail"_by_Anton_Refregier_at_Rincon_Annex_Post_Office_located_near_the_Embarcadero_at_101_Spear_Street,_San_Francisco,_California_LCCN2013630287	Anton Refregier	1948		
Rincon Center	History of San Francisco (Miners Panning Gold)	History_of_San_Francisco_mural_"Miners_Panning_Gold"_by_Anton_Refregier_at_Rincon_Annex_Post_Office_located_near_the_Embarcadero_at_101_Spear_Street,_San_Francisco,_California_LCCN2013630284	Anton Refregier	1948		
Rincon Center	History of San Francisco (Pioneers Receiving Mail)	History_of_San_Francisco_mural_"Pioneers_Receiving_Mail"_by_Anton_Refregier,_at_Rincon_Annex_Post_Office_located_near_the_Embarcadero_at_101_Spear_Street,_San_Francisco,_California_LCCN2013630280	Anton Refregier	1948		
Rincon Center	History of San Francisco (Building the Railroad)	Anton_Refregier_at_Rincon_Annex_Post_Office_20853v	Anton Refregier	1948		
Rincon Center	History of San Francisco (Raising the Bear Flag)	History_of_San_Francisco_mural_"Raising_the_Bear_Flag"_by_Anton_Refregier_at_Rincon_Annex_Post_Office_located_near_the_Embarcadero_at_101_Spear_Street,_San_Francisco,_California_LCCN2013630285	Anton Refregier	1948		
Rincon Center	History of San Francisco (Vigilante Days)	History_of_San_Francisco_mural_"Vigilante_Days"_by_Anton_Refregier_at_Rincon_Annex_Post_Office_located_near_the_Embarcadero_at_101_Spear_Street,_San_Francisco,_California_LCCN2013630282	Anton Refregier	1948		
Rincon Center	History of San Francisco (Earthquake and Fire of 1906)	History_of_San_Francisco_mural_"Earthquake_and_Fire_of_1906"_by_Anton_Refregier_at_Rincon_Annex_Post_Office_located_near_the_Embarcadero_at_101_Spear_Street,_San_Francisco,_California_LCCN2013630296	Anton Refregier	1948		
Rincon Center	History of San Francisco (Reconstruction After the Fire)	History_of_San_Francisco_mural_"Reconstruction_After_the_Fire"_by_Anton_Refregier_at_Rincon_Annex_Post_Office_located_near_the_Embarcadero_at_101_Spear_Street,_San_Francisco,_California_LCCN2013630295	Anton Refregier	1948		
Rincon Center	History of San Francisco (The Mooney Case)	History_of_San_Francisco_mural_23_by_Anton_Refregier_in_Rincon_Center	Anton Refregier	1948		
Rincon Center	History of San Francisco (Building the Golden Gate)	History_of_San_Francisco_mural_"Building_the_Golden_Gate"_by_Anton_Refregier_at_Rincon_Annex_Post_Office_located_near_the_Embarcadero_at_101_Spear_Street,_San_Francisco,_California_LCCN2013630293	Anton Refregier	1948		
Rincon Center	History of San Francisco (The Waterfront)	History_of_San_Francisco_mural_"The_Waterfront"_by_Anton_Refregier_at_Rincon_Annex_Post_Office_located_near_the_Embarcadero_at_101_Spear_Street,_San_Francisco,_California_LCCN2013630294	Anton Refregier	1948		
Rincon Center	History of San Francisco (Shipyards during the war)	History_of_San_Francisco_mural_"Reconstruction_After_the_Fire"_by_Anton_Refregier_at_Rincon_Annex_Post_Office_located_near_the_Embarcadero_at_101_Spear_Street,_San_Francisco,_California_LCCN2013630295	Anton Refregier	1948		
Rincon Center	History of San Francisco (War and Peace)	History_of_San_Francisco_mural_"War_and_Peace"_by_Anton_Refregier_at_Rincon_Annex_Post_Office_located_near_the_Embarcadero_at_101_Spear_Street,_San_Francisco,_California_LCCN2013630292	Anton Refregier	1948		
Rincon Center	History of San Francisco (San Francisco as a Cultural Center)	History_of_San_Francisco_mural_"San_Francisco_as_a_Cultural_Center"_by_Anton_Refregier_at_Rincon_Annex_Post_Office_located_near_the_Embarcadero_at_101_Spear_Street,_San_Francisco,_California_LCCN2013630297	Anton Refregier	1948		
Rincon Center	History of San Francisco (A California Indian Creates)	History_of_San_Francisco_mural_01_by_Anton_Refregier_in_Rincon_Center	Anton Refregier	1948		
Rincon Center	History of San Francisco (Sir Francis Drake)	History_of_San_Francisco_mural_03_by_Anton_Refregier_in_Rincon_Center	Anton Refregier	1948		
Rincon Center	History of San Francisco (Monks Building the Mission)	History_of_San_Francisco_mural_"Monks_Building_the_Mission"_by_Anton_Refregier_at_Rincon_Annex_Post_Office_located_near_the_Embarcadero_at_101_Spear_Street,_San_Francisco,_California_LCCN2013630291	Anton Refregier	1948		
Rincon Center	History of San Francisco (Finding Gold at Sutter's Mill)	History_of_San_Francisco_mural_11_by_Anton_Refregier_in_Rincon_Center	Anton Refregier	1948		
Rincon Center	History of San Francisco (Arrival By Ship)	History_of_San_Francisco_mural_"Arrival_by_Ship"_by_Anton_Refregier_at_Rincon_Annex_Post_Office_located_near_the_Embarcadero_at_101_Spear_Street,_San_Francisco,_California_LCCN2013630283	Anton Refregier	1948		
Rincon Center	History of San Francisco (Fort Ross)	History_of_San_Francisco_mural_"Fort_Ross"_by_Anton_Refregier_at_Rincon_Annex_Post_Office_located_near_the_Embarcadero_at_101_Spear_Street,_San_Francisco,_California_LCCN2013630289	Anton Refregier	1948		
Rincon Center	History of San Francisco (Beating the Chinese)	History_of_San_Francisco_mural_"Beating_the_Chinese"_by_Anton_Refregier_at_Rincon_Annex_Post_Office_located_near_the_Embarcadero_at_101_Spear_Street,_San_Francisco,_California_LCCN2013630300	Anton Refregier	1948		
Rincon Center	History of San Francisco (Torchlight Procession)	History_of_San_Francisco_mural_"Torchlight_Procession"_by_Anton_Refregier_at_Rincon_Annex_Post_Office_located_near_the_Embarcadero_at_101_Spear_Street,_San_Francisco,_California_LCCN2013630301	Anton Refregier	1948		
Rincon Center	History of San Francisco (Civil War Issues)	History_of_San_Francisco_mural_18_by_Anton_Refregier_in_Rincon_Center	Anton Refregier	1948		
Rincon Center	History of San Francisco (Early Newspaper Office)	History_of_San_Francisco_mural_"An_Early_Newspaper_Office"_by_Anton_Refregier_at_Rincon_Annex_Post_Office_located_near_the_Embarcadero_at_101_Spear_Street,_San_Francisco,_California_LCCN2013630286	Anton Refregier	1948		
Beach Chalet	Beach Chalet Murals (1-2)	Beach_Chalet_murals_by_Lucien_Labaudt_7	Lucien Labaudt	1936-1937		
Beach Chalet	Beach Chalet Murals (3)	Beach_Chalet_murals_by_Lucien_Labaudt_6	Lucien Labaudt	1936-1937	Baker Beach	
Beach Chalet	Beach Chalet Murals (4)	Beach_Chalet_murals_by_Lucien_Labaudt_5	Lucien Labaudt	1936-1937	Golden Gate Park	
Beach Chalet	Beach Chalet Murals (5-6)	Beach_Chalet_murals_by_Lucien_Labaudt	Lucien Labaudt	1936-1937	Lands End Marina District	
Beach Chalet	Beach Chalet Murals (7-8)	Beach_Chalet_murals_by_Lucien_Labaudt_2	Lucien Labaudt	1936-1937	San Francisco City Hall	
Beach Chalet	Beach Chalet Murals (9)	Beach_Chalet_murals_by_Lucien_Labaudt_3	Lucien Labaudt	1936-1937	Chinatown	
Canoga Park High School	Assembly Hall (2)		Helen Lundeberg		Petrachrome	
Mother's House, Fleishhacker Playground	End walls of the loggia		Helen Bell Bruton, Margaret Bruton		Tile mosaic	PWAP
Mother's House, Fleishhacker Playground	Evolution of Noah's Ark		Dorothy Puccinelli, Helen Forbes		Tempera	PWAP
Los Angeles County Hall of Records	Landing of Cabrillo — 1542		Charles H. Davis		Tempera	FAP
	Recreations of Long Beach		Stanton Macdonald-Wright, Henry Allen Nord, Albert King		Mosaic	FAP

== Colorado ==
Location	Mural title	Image	Artist	Date	Notes	NRHP listed
Colorado Springs Fine Arts Center, Colorado Springs	"Classic American theater"		Ward Lockwood	1935–36	slated for removal	
Grand Junction Federal Courthouse, Grand Junction	The Harvest	WPA_mural._Wayne_N._Aspinall_Federal_Building_and_U.S._Courthouse,_Grand_Junction,_Colorado_LCCN2014650035	Louise Emerson Ronnebeck	1940		

== Connecticut ==
Location	Mural title	Image	Artist	Date	Notes	NRHP listed

== Delaware ==
Location	Mural title	Image	Artist	Date	Notes	NRHP listed

== District of Columbia ==
New Deal art was installed in the Social Security building (now HHS), the Department of the Interior, the Department of Justice building, the Department of Labor building (now Customs and Immigration), the Apex building (now Federal Trade Commission), the Government Printing Office Annex, the Home Owners Loan Corporation, the National Zoological Park, the District of Columbia Recorder of Deeds building, the Procurement Division Building (now National Capitol Region Office Building, General Services Administration), and the War Department (now Department of State).

=== Elsewhere than government building ===
Location	Mural title	Image	Artist	Date	Notes	NRHP listed
Howard University	Emancipation of the American Negro		Daniel Boza	1938		

=== Social Security Building ===
Location	Mural title	Image	Artist	Date	Notes	NRHP listed
Social Security Building	Sports Related to Food		Dorothy Farr, Fred Farr	1941	Stored in National Museum of American Art	
Social Security Building	Wealth of the Nation, Security of the People	Industrial_Life_(mural_study,_old_Social_Security_Building,_Washington,_DC)_SAAM-1974.28.310_1	Seymour Fogel	1942		
Social Security Building	Activities of Four Parts of the Country	Gertrude_Goodrich_-_Scenes_of_American_Life_(Beach)_-_Smithsonian_American_Art_Museum	Gertrude Goodrich	1943	Stored in National Museum of American Art	
Social Security Building	Reconstruction and Well-Being of the Family	Auditorium_with_mural_at_the_Wilbur_J._Cohen_Federal_Building,_Washington,_D.C_LCCN2013634391	Philip Guston	1942	Stage curtain in auditorium	non-mural, non-sculpture
Social Security Building	Mountains in Snow		Jenne Magafan, Ethel Magafan	1949		
Social Security Building	Meaning of Social Security (West Wall)	Mural_at_the_Wilbur_J._Cohen_Federal_Building,_Washington,_D.C_LCCN2013634376	Ben Shahn	1942		
Social Security Building	Meaning of Social Security (East Wall)	Ben_Shahn_mural_located_at_the_Wilbur_J._Cohen_Federal_Building,_Washington,_D.C_LCCN2013634372	Ben Shahn	1942		

=== Main Interior Building ===
Location	Mural title	Image	Artistrush	Date	Notes	NRHP listed
Main Interior Building	Harvest Dance	Mural_"Harvest_Dance,"_by_James_Auchiah_at_the_Department_of_Interior_Building,_Washington,_D.C_LCCN2013634523	James Auchiah	1939		
Main Interior Building	Tropical Country	Mural_"Bureau_of_Indian_Affairs-_Indian_&_Teacher,"_by_Maynard_Dixon_at_the_Department_of_Interior_Building,_Washington,_D.C_LCCN2013634531	Gifford Beal	1941		
Main Interior Building	National Park Service: North Country	Mural_"National_Park_Service-_North_Country,"_by_Gifford_Beal_at_the_Department_of_Interior_Building,_Washington,_D.C_LCCN2013634537	Gifford Beal	1941		
Main Interior Building	Conservation—Western Lands		Louis Bouche	1938	"in storage" circa 1984	
Main Interior Building	Petroleum Industry: Distribution and Use	Mural_"Petroleum_Industry-_Distribution_&_Use,"_by_Edgar_Britton_at_the_Department_of_Interior_Building,_Washington,_D.C_LCCN2013634533	Edgar Britton	1939		
Main Interior Building	Petroleum Industry	Mural_"Petroleum_Industry-_Production,"_by_Edgar_Britton_at_the_Department_of_Interior_Building,_Washington,_D.C_LCCN2013634532	Edgar Britton	1939		
Main Interior Building	Gathering Dates	Mural_"Gathering_dates,"_by_Nicolai_Cikovsky_at_the_Department_of_Interior_Building,_Washington,_D.C_LCCN2013634527	Nicolai Cikovsky	1938		
Main Interior Building	Irrigation	Mural_"Irrigation,"_by_Nicolai_Cikovsky_at_the_Department_of_Interior_Building,_Washington,_D.C_LCCN2013634524	Nicolai Cikovsky	1938		
Main Interior Building	Apple Industry	Mural_"Apple_Industry,"_by_Nicolai_Cikovsky_at_the_Department_of_Interior_Building,_Washington,_D.C_LCCN2013634525	Nicolai Cikovsky	1938		
Main Interior Building	Desert	Mural_"Desert,"_by_Nicolai_Cikovsky_at_the_Department_of_Interior_Building,_Washington,_D.C_LCCN2013634526	Nicolai Cikovsky	1938		
Main Interior Building	Peyote Bird and Symbols, Stealing Horses, Flute Player, Courting	Stealing_Horses_(mural_study_for_recreation_room,_U.S._Department_of_the_Interior,_Washington,_D.C.)_SAAM-1974.28.311_1	Woodrow Crumbo	1940	Native American artist	
Main Interior Building	Deer	Mural_with_animals_at_Interior_Department_Building,_Washington,_D.C_LCCN2013634072	Woodrow Crumbo			
Main Interior Building	Buffalo Hunt	Mural_showing_Native_Americans_on_horseback_by_artist_Crumbo_at_the_Interior_Department_Building,_Washington,_D.C_LCCN2013634077	Woodrow Crumbo	1940		
Main Interior Building	Rush for the Oklahoma Land—1889	Mural-_The_Oklahoma_Land_Rush,_April_22,_1889,_by_John_Steuart_Curry_at_the_Department_of_Interior,_Washington,_D.C_LCCN2013634347	John Steuart Curry	1939		
Main Interior Building	The Homestead and Building of the Barbed Wire Fence		John Steuart Curry	1939		
Main Interior Building	Bureau of Indian Affairs, Confronting the Indians	Mural_"Bureau_of_Indian_Affairs-_Indian_&_Soldier,"_by_Maynard_Dixon_at_the_Department_of_Interior_Building,_Washington,_D.C_LCCN2013634530	Maynard Dixon	1939		
Main Interior Building	Bureau of Indian Affairs: Indian and Teacher	Mural_"Bureau_of_Indian_Affairs-_Indian_&_Teacher,"_by_Maynard_Dixon_at_the_Department_of_Interior_Building,_Washington,_D.C_LCCN2013634531	Maynard Dixon	1939		
Main Interior Building	Placer Mining		Ernest Fiene	1938		
Main Interior Building	Replanting the Wasteland	Mural-_"Replanting_the_Wasteland,"_by_Ernest_Fiene_at_the_Department_of_Interior,_Washington,_D.C_LCCN2013634332	Ernest Fiene	1938		
Main Interior Building	Fighting Forest Fire	Mural_"Fighting_Forest_Fire,"_by_Ernest_Fiene_at_the_Department_of_Interior_Building,_Washington,_D.C_LCCN2013634535	Ernest Fiene	1938		
Main Interior Building	Winter Round-Up	Mural_"Winter_Roundup,"_by_Ernest_Fiene_at_the_Department_of_Interior_Building,_Washington,_D.C_LCCN2013634534	Ernest Fiene	1938		
Main Interior Building	Construction of the Dam		William Gropper	1939		
Main Interior Building	Buffalo Chase	Detail_of_mural_showing_Native_American_on_horse_back_by_artist_Velino_Herrera_at_the_Interior_Department_Building,_Washington,_D.C_LCCN2013634070	Velino Herrera	1939	Nine panels	
Main Interior Building	Pueblo Life: Pottery Makers	Mural_showing_Native_American_woman_by_artist_Velino_Herrara_at_the_Interior_Department_Building,_Washington,_D.C_LCCN2013634095	Velino Herrera	1939		
Main Interior Building	Woman with Child	Detail_of_mural_showing_Native_American_woman_with_child_by_artist_Velino_Herrara_at_the_Interior_Department_Building,_Washington,_D.C_LCCN2013634071	Velino Herrera	1939		
Main Interior Building	Women Carrying Pottery	Mural_showing_Native_American_woman_by_artist_Velino_Herrara_at_the_Interior_Department_Building,_Washington,_D.C_LCCN2013634094	Velino Herrera	1939		
Main Interior Building	Eagle Dance Design		Velino Herrera	1939		
Main Interior Building	Singing Love Songs (Right Panel)	Mural_showing_Native_Americans_on_horseback_by_artist_Allan_Houser_at_the_Interior_Department_Building,_Washington,_D.C_LCCN2013634075	Allan C. Houser	1940		
Main interior Building	Nailor Mural	Mural_showing_Native_Americans_on_horseback_by_A._Houser_at_the_Interior_Department_Building,_Washington,_D.C_LCCN2013634092	Allan C. Houser and Gerald Nailor	1940		
Main Interior Building	Singing Love Songs (Left Panel)	Mural_showing_Native_Americans_on_horseback_by_artist_Allan_Houser_at_the_Interior_Department_Building,_Washington,_D.C_LCCN2013634073	Allan C. Houser	1940		
Main Interior Building	Apache Round Dance		Allan C. Houser	1940		
Main Interior Building	Themes of the National Parks: Bryce Canyon	Mural_"Themes_of_the_National_Parks-_Bryce_Canyon_National_Park,"_by_David_McCosh_at_the_Department_of_Interior_Building,_Washington,_D.C_LCCN2013634543	David McCosh	1940		
Main Interior Building	Themes of the National Parks: Yosemite	Mural_"Themes_of_the_National_Parks-_Yosemite_National_Park,"_by_David_McCosh_at_the_Department_of_Interior_Building,_Washington,_D.C_LCCN2013634544	David McCosh	1940		
Main Interior Building	Indian Theme: Ceremonial Dance	Mural_"Ceremonial_Dance,"_by_Stephen_Mopope_at_the_Department_of_Interior_Building,_Washington,_D.C_LCCN2013634546	Stevan Mopope	1939		
Main Interior Building	Hunting Ground		Gerald Nailor	1940		
Main Interior Building	Initiation Ceremony	Mural_showing_Native_Americans_by_artist_Gerald_Nailor_at_the_Interior_Department_Building,_Washington,_D.C_LCCN2013634076	Gerald Nailor	1940		
Main Interior Building	Insular Possessions: Virgin Islands	Mural_"Insular_Possession-_Virgin_Islands,"_by_James_Michael_Newell_at_the_Department_of_Interior_Building,_Washington,_D.C_LCCN2013634549	James Michael Newell	1939		
Main Interior Building	Insular Possessions: Alaska	Mural_"Insular_Possession-_Alaska,"_by_James_Michael_Newell_at_the_Department_of_Interior_Building,_Washington,_D.C_LCCN2013634548	James Michael Newell	1939		
Main Interior Building	Conservation of Wildlife		Henry Varnum Poor	1939	Fresco	
Main Interior Building	The Negro's Contribution in the Social and Cultural Development of America		Millard Sheets	1943	The Arts, Religion, Education, Science	
Main Interior Building	Science	Mural_"Science,"_by_Millard_Owen_Sheets_at_the_Department_of_Interior_Building,_Washington,_D.C_LCCN2013634550	Millard Sheets	1943		
Main Interior Building	Religion	Mural_"Religion,"_by_Millard_Owen_Sheets_at_the_Department_of_Interior_Building,_Washington,_D.C_LCCN2013634551	Millard Sheets	1943		
Main Interior Building	Education	Mural-_"Education,"_by_Millard_Owen_Sheets_at_the_Department_of_Interior,_Washington,_D.C_LCCN2013634339	Millard Sheets	1943		
Main Interior Building	An Incident in Contemporary American Life	Jamieson-Incident-in-Contemporary_American-Life	Mitchell Jamieson	1943		

=== Department of Justice ===
Location	Mural title	Image	Artist	Date	Notes	NRHP listed
Department of Justice	Contemporary Justice and Man	Painting_"Contemporary_Justice_and_Man,"_second_floor_stairway,_Department_of_Justice,_Washington,_D.C_LCCN2010720189	John Ballator	1937	tempera	
Department of Justice	Society Freed Through Justice	Fresco_painting_"Society_Freed_Through_Justice,"_fifth_floor_stairway,_Department_of_Justice,_Washington,_D.C_LCCN2010720192	George Biddle	1936	Fresco	
Department of Justice	Contemporary Justice and Woman	Oil_painting_"Contemporary_Justice_and_Woman,"_first_floor_lobby,_Department_of_Justice,_Washington,_D.C_LCCN2010720193	Emil Bisttram	1939	oil on canvas	
Department of Justice	Activities of the Department of Justice	Full_view_of_oil_paintings,_fifth_floor_elevator_no._10,_Department_of_Justice,_Washington,_D.C_LCCN2010720207	Louis Bouche	1937	oil on canvas	
Department of Justice	Movement of the Population Westward, Law Versus Mob Rule		John Steuart Curry	1937	oil on canvas	
Department of Justice	The Triumph of Justice, The Defeat of Justice		Leon Kroll	1937	oil on canvas	
Department of Justice	Justice Department Bureaus and Divisions	Fresco_paintings_above_entrance_to_room_5114,_Department_of_Justice,_Washington,_D.C_LCCN2010720222	1936	fresco		
Department of Justice	Great Events and Figures of the Law		Boardman Robinson	1936	tempera	
Department of Justice	Contemporary Justice—the Child	Painting_"Contemporary_Justice_and_Child"_Great_Hall,_Department_of_Justice,_Washington,_D.C_LCCN2010720206	Symeon Shimin	1940	tempera	
Department of Justice	Man's Struggle for Justice	Main_Library,_Robert_F._Kennedy_Department_of_Justice_Building,_Washington,_D.C_LCCN2010718995	1941	oil on board; 20 panels		

=== Department of Labor Building ===
Location	Mural title	Image	Artist	Date	Notes	NRHP listed
Department of Labor	Construction, Power, and Transportation		Charles Trumbo Henry	1938	oil on canvas	

=== National Zoo ===
Location	Mural title	Image	Artist	Date	Notes	NRHP listed
National Zoo	Noah's Ark, Habitat Backgrounds in Bird and Pachyderm Houses		Domenico Mortellito	1937	mural	

=== Washington, D.C. Recorder of Deeds ===
Location	Mural title	Image	Artist	Date	Notes	NRHP listed
D.C. Recorder of Deeds	Crispus Attucks	"Crispus_Attucks,"_by_Herschel_Levit,_mural_at_the_Recorder_of_Deeds_building,_built_in_1943._515_D_St.,_NW,_Washington,_D.C_LCCN2010641712	Herschel Levit	1943		
D.C. Recorder of Deeds	The Death of Colonel Shaw at Fort Wagner		Carlos Lopez	1943		
D.C. Recorder of Deeds	The Battle of New Orleans	"Andrew_Jackson_at_the_Battle_of_New_Orleans,_January_8,_1814,"_mural_by_Ethel_Magafan,_at_the_Recorder_of_Deeds_building,_built_in_1943._515_D_St.,_NW,_Washington,_D.C_LCCN2010641713	Ethel Magafan	1943		
D.C. Recorder of Deeds	Matthew Henson Planting the American Flag at the North Pole	Mural_of_Alexander_Henson_planting_the_American_flag_at_North_Pole,_by_Austin_Mecklem,_at_the_Recorder_of_Deeds_building,_built_in_1943._515_D_St.,_NW,_Washington,_D.C_LCCN2010641718	Austin Mecklem	1943		
D.C. Recorder of Deeds	Cyrus Tiffany at the Battle of Lake Erie	"Cyrus_Tiffany_in_the_Battle_of_Lake_Erie,_September_13,_1813,"_mural_by_Martyl_Schweig,_at_the_Recorder_of_Deeds_building,_built_in_1943._515_D_St.,_NW,_Washington,_D.C_LCCN2010641716	Martyl Schweig	1943		
D.C. Recorder of Deeds	Frederick Douglass Appeals to President Lincoln		William Edouard Scott	1943		
D.C. Recorder of Deeds	Benjamin Banneker		1943			

=== Procurement Division Building ===
Location	Mural title	Image	Artist	Date	Notes	NRHP listed
Procurement Division Building	Construction of Treasury buildings and Procurement Division activities		Harold Weston	1936–38	TRAP, 22 panels, oil on canvas	

== Florida ==
Location	Mural title	Image	Artist	Date	Notes	NRHP listed

== Georgia ==
Location	Mural title	Image	Artist	Date	Notes	NRHP listed

== Hawaii ==
Location	Mural title	Image	Artist	Date	Notes	NRHP listed

== Idaho ==
Location	Mural title	Image	Artist	Date	Notes	NRHP listed

== Illinois ==
Location	Mural title	Image	Artist	Date	Notes	NRHP listed
Legler Library, Chicago	Father Marquette's Winter in Chicago		Richard Fayerweather Babcock	1934		
Krannert Art Museum	Mural Painting	Detail_of_New_Deal_Art_Projects_mural_by_Edwin_Boyd_Johnson,_1934	Edwin Boyd Johnson	1934		

== Indiana ==
Location	Mural title	Image	Artist	Date	Notes	NRHP listed

== Iowa ==
Location	Mural title	Image	Artist	Date	Notes	NRHP listed

== Kansas ==
Location	Mural title	Image	Artist	Date	Notes	NRHP listed

== Kentucky ==
Location	Mural title	Image	Artist	Date	Notes	NRHP listed

== Louisiana ==
Location	Mural title	Image	Artist	Date	Notes	NRHP listed

== Maine ==
Location	Mural title	Image	Artist	Date	Notes	NRHP listed

== Maryland ==
Location	Mural title	Image	Artist	Date	Notes	NRHP listed

== Massachusetts ==
Location	Mural title	Image	Artist	Date	Notes	NRHP listed

== Michigan ==
Location	Mural title	Image	Artist	Date	Notes	NRHP listed
East Lansing, Michigan; Auditorium, MSU	Proclamation of Emancipation		Charles Pollock	1943		
East Lansing, Michigan; Auditorium, MSU	We Assure Freedom to the Free		Charles Pollock	1944		
East Lansing, Michigan; Auditorium, MSU	The Modern Man I Sing		Charles Pollock	1944		
Lansing, Michigan; John F Dye Water Conditioning Plant	Beneficial Force of Water		Frank Cassara	1940		
Lansing, Michigan; John F Dye Water Conditioning Plant	Water as Destructive Element		Frank Cassara	1940		
Lansing, Michigan; John F Dye Water Conditioning Plant	Water as Hydro-Electric Power		Charles Pollock	1940		

== Minnesota ==
Location	Mural title	Image	Artist	Date	Notes	NRHP listed

== Mississippi ==
Location	Mural title	Image	Artist	Date	Notes	NRHP listed

== Missouri ==
Location	Mural title	Image	Artist	Date	Notes	NRHP listed

== Montana ==
Location	Mural title	Image	Artist	Date	Notes	NRHP listed

== Nebraska ==
Location	Mural title	Image	Artist	Date	Notes	NRHP listed

== Nevada ==
Location	Mural title	Image	Artist	Date	Notes	NRHP listed

== New Hampshire ==
Location	Mural title	Image	Artist	Date	Notes	NRHP listed
Federal Building (Laconia, New Hampshire)	Wildlife in White Mountains		Musa McKim	1941	Former U.S. Forestry Building	

== New Jersey ==
Location	Mural title	Image	Artist	Date	Notes	NRHP listed
Newark City Hall	History of Newark		Michael Lenson			
Weequahic High School	History of the Enlightenment of Man		Michael Lenson			
Roosevelt Community Center	Social and political liberty and justice		Ben Shahn			
Atlantic City Stanley Holmes Village	Education of the Colored Man		Aaron Douglas			
Camden Westfield Acres	Industrial Scenes		Grace Greenwood, Marion Greenwood,			buildings demolished; National Archives images of murals (?)
Newark Museum	Mechanics of Flying, Aerial Map		Arshile Gorky	1937	2 of original 10 survive; originally at Newark Airport Admin Bldg.	

== New Mexico ==
Location	Mural title	Image	Artist	Date	Notes	NRHP listed
Rogers Hall; New Mexico Highlands University; Las Vegas	Dissemination of Education on New Mexico		Lloyd Moylan	1937		NRHP
Alamagordo Federal Building	Sun and Rain, Sorghum, Yucca		Peter Hurd	1940	fresco	
Santa Fe Santiago E. Campos United States Courthouse	Old Santa Fe Trail, Taos Mountains, Monument Rock, Acoma, Old Cuba Road, Cabezon		William Penhallow Henderson		Six panels, TRAP, begun under PWAP	1974

== New York ==
Location	Mural title	Image	Artist	Date	Notes	NRHP listed
Marine Air Terminal, LaGuardia Airport	Flight		James Brooks	1942	Largest WPA mural ever painted	

== North Carolina ==
Location	Mural title	Image	Artist	Date	Notes	NRHP listed

== North Dakota ==
Location	Mural title	Image	Artist	Date	Notes	NRHP listed

== Ohio ==
Location	Mural title	Image	Artist	Date	Notes	NRHP listed
Lakeview Terrace Housing Project, Cleveland	Legends and Fairy Tales	Earl J. Neff	1938	Mural frieze		
Lakeview Terrace Housing Project, Cleveland	Children Playing	Charles Campbell (artist)	1938	2 murals		
United States Industrial Reformatory, Chillicothe	Vocational Training in the Reformatory	E. Paul Wilhelm	1938	2 murals		

== Oklahoma ==
Location	Mural title	Image	Artist	Date	Notes	NRHP listed

== Oregon ==
Location	Mural title	Image	Artist	Date	Notes	NRHP listed

== Pennsylvania ==
Location	Mural title	Image	Artist	Date	Notes	NRHP listed

== Puerto Rico ==
Location	Mural title	Image	Artist	Date	Notes	NRHP listed

== Rhode Island ==
Location	Mural title	Image	Artist	Date	Notes	NRHP listed

== South Carolina ==
Location	Mural title	Image	Artist	Date	Notes	NRHP listed
Aiken	Justice as Protector and Avenger		Stefan Hirsch	1938	oil on canvas Charles E. Simons Jr. Federal Court House; Controversy once caused the mural to be covered and only visible to the public upon request	

== South Dakota ==
Location	Mural title	Image	Artist	Date	Notes	NRHP listed

== Tennessee ==
Location	Mural title	Image	Artist	Date	Notes	NRHP listed
John Sevier State Office Building, Nashville	"Discovery of Tennessee" & "Development of Tennessee"		Dean Cornwell	1940		

== Texas ==
Location	Mural title	Image	Artist	Date	Notes	NRHP listed
Eldon B. Mahon United States Courthouse, Fort Worth	The Taking of Sam Bass		Frank Mechau	1940	oil on canvas	
Eldon B. Mahon United States Courthouse, Fort Worth	Texas Rangers in Camp		Frank Mechau	1940	oil on canvas	
Eldon B. Mahon United States Courthouse, Fort Worth	Flags Over Texas		Frank Mechau	1940	oil on canvas	

== Utah ==
Location	Mural title	Image	Artist	Date	Notes	NRHP listed

== Vermont ==
Location	Mural title	Image	Artist	Date	Notes	NRHP listed

== Virgin Islands ==
Location	Mural title	Image	Artist	Date	Notes	NRHP listed

== Virginia ==
Location	Mural title	Image	Artist	Date	Notes	NRHP listed

== Washington ==
Location	Mural title	Image	Artist	Date	Notes	NRHP listed

== Wisconsin ==
Location	Mural title	Image	Artist	Date	Notes	NRHP listed

== Wyoming ==
Location	Mural title	Image	Artist	Date	Notes	NRHP listed

== See also ==
- List of New Deal sculpture
- List of Native American-themed murals
- List of United States post office murals
- List of United States federal courthouses
- List of Art Deco architecture in the United States
