= List of United States post office murals in Maryland =

Following is a list of United States post office murals created in Maryland between 1934 and 1943.

Location	Mural title	Image	Artist	Date	Notes	NRHP listed
Bel Air	First Performance of Edwin Booth		William Calfee	1938		
Bethesda	Montgomery County Farm Women's Market		Robert Franklin Gates	1939	after renovation in 2013, the mural was reinstalled in the Bethesda – Chevy Chase Regional Service Center	
Catonsville	Incidents in the History of Catonsville		Avery F. Johnson	1942	Three panels; currently covered from view	
Elkton	Arrival of the Post, 1780		Alexander B. Clayton	1939	oil on canvas Missing	
Ellicott City	Scenes of Old Ellicott City		R. Dunne	1942	tempera oil in plaster	
Hagerstown	Transportation of the Mail		Frank Weathers Long	1938	three panels	
Hyattsville			Eugene Kingman	1938	tempera oil on plaster	1986
Oakland	Buckwheat Harvest		Robert Franklin Gates	1939	tempera	
Rockville	Sugarloaf Mountain		Judson Smith	1940	Mural featured on 2019 Post Office Murals stamp set	
Salisbury	Cotton Patch		Jacob Getlar Smith	1939	on display at the NRHP-listed Maude R. Toulson Federal Building and Post Office in Salisbury	2016
Salisbury	Salisbury		Jacob Getlar Smith	1939	on display at the NRHP-listed Maude R. Toulson Federal Building and Post Office in Salisbury	2016
Salisbury	Stage at Bryd's Inn		Jacob Getlar Smith	1939	on display at the NRHP-listed Maude R. Toulson Federal Building and Post Office in Salisbury	2016
Silver Spring	The Old tavern		Nicolai Cikovsky	1937	on display at the Silver Spring Public Library	
Towson	History of Transportation		Nicolai Cikovsky	1939	five tempera panels	
