= List of Native American-themed murals =

Of the four hundred New Deal murals depicting American Indian themes in the Sections program, only 24 were actually painted by American Indian artists.

== 1937 ==
- The Story of Natural Drugs, University of Illinois at Chicago Medical Center, Chicago, Illinois, Thomas Jefferson League, oil on Masonite, 5 panels. The panels illustrate the use of indigenous Native American remedies derived from natural sources, by Spanish explorers in the New World.
- Legends of Fernandino and Gabrileno Indians (1937), North Hollywood High School, Los Angeles, California, Fletcher Martin

== Date needed ==
- The Jicarilla Apache Trading Post, Carlsbad, New Mexico, La Verne Nelson Black (1887–1938)
- Native Americans, University of New Mexico, Zimmerman Library, Kenneth Adams
- Father LeMoyne Trying to Convert the Indians on Pathfinders Island, Fulton, New York, Caroline S. Rohland

== Alabama ==
| Location | Mural title | Image | Artist | Date | Notes | NRHP listed |
|---|---|---|---|---|---|---|
| USPO; Tuscumbia | Chief Tuscumbia Greets the Dickson Family | | Jack McMillen | 1939 | | |

== Arizona ==
| Location | Mural title | Image | Artist | Date | Notes | NRHP listed |
|---|---|---|---|---|---|---|
| United States Post Office, Phoenix, Arizona | Progress of the Pioneer, the Arrival of the U.S. Mail Coach | | La Verne Nelson Black | 1937 | | 83002993 |
| United States Post Office, Phoenix, Arizona | Spanish Explorers and American Indians | | Oscar Berninghaus | 1939 | | 83002993 |

== District of Columbia ==
| Location | Mural title | Image | Artist | Date | Notes | NRHP listed |
|---|---|---|---|---|---|---|
| William Jefferson Clinton Federal Building; Washington, D.C. | Dangers of the Mail | | Frank Mechau | 1937 | | 66000865 |
| University of Illinois at Chicago; Medical Center, Chicago | The Story of Natural Drugs | | Thomas Jefferson League | 1937 | The panels illustrate the use of indigenous Native American remedies derived from natural sources, by Spanish explorers in the New World. | |
| Federal Building (formerly Main Post Office Department building) | Covered Wagon Attacked by Indians | | William C. Palmer | 1937 | | |

== Illinois ==
| Location | Mural title | Image | Artist | Date | Notes | NRHP listed |
|---|---|---|---|---|---|---|
| Legler Library, Chicago | Father Marquette's Winter in Chicago | | Richard Fayerweather Babcock (1887 - 1954) | 1934 | | |
| Cliff Dwellers Club; Chicago | Navaha | | John W. Norton | 1909-1910 | oil on canvas | |
| The Rookery Building, Chicago | La Salle, 1680 | | Gordon Stevenson | 1910 | oil on canvas | |
| Traders Building | Indians and Settlers at Fort Dearborn | | Edgar Spier Cameron (1862-1944) | 1913-1914 | oil on canvas restored in 1986 | |
| Calumet Park Fieldhouse, Chicago | Indian Ceremony | | Thomas C. Lea III | 1927-1929 | | NRHP; 03000788 |
| Calumet Park Fieldhouse, Chicago | Father Marquette with Traders and Indians | | Thomas C. Lea III | 1927-1929 | | NRHP; 03000788 |
| Calumet Park Fieldhouse, Chicago | Hunting Party Returns to Village | | Thomas C. Lea III | 1927-1929 | | NRHP; 03000788 |
| Calumet Park Fieldhouse, Chicago | Indians and Fur Traders | | Thomas C. Lea III | 1927-1929 | | NRHP; 03000788 |
| Legler Library, Chicago | Father Marquette's Winter in Chicago | | Richard Fayerweather Babcock | 1934 | murals is 11' by 18' | 86003169 |
| Morgan Park Station post office, Chicago | Father Jacques Marquette, 1674 | | Theodore Johnson | 1937 | | |
| Loop Station Post Office, Chicago | Great Indian Council-1833 | | Gustaf Dalstrom | 1938 | | |
| USPO; Gibson City, | Hiawatha Returning with Minnehaha | | Frances Foy | 1940 | | |
| USPO; Herrin | George Rogers Clark Conferring With Indians Near Herrin | | Gustaf Dalstrom | 1940 | | |

== Massachusetts ==
| Location | Mural title | Image | Artist | Date | Notes | NRHP listed |
|---|---|---|---|---|---|---|
| Chestnut Hill | The Reverend John Elliot Preaching to the Indians | | William Abbott Cheever | 1941 | | |

== Missouri ==
| Location | Mural title | Image | Artist | Date | Notes | NRHP listed |
|---|---|---|---|---|---|---|
| USPO; Columbia | Indians Watching Stagecoach in the Distance | | Edward Buk Ulreich | 1937 | | |
| St. Joseph | Indian Boat Race | | Gustaf Dalstrom | 1941 | | |
| USPO; St. Louis | Cycle of history of the region | | Edward Millman and Mitchell Siporin | 1942 | | |

== New Mexico ==
| Location | Mural title | Image | Artist | Date | Notes | NRHP listed |
|---|---|---|---|---|---|---|
| Gallup, New Mexico; McKinley County Courthouse, | The Zuni Potters | | La Verne Nelson Black | 1937 | | |
| Rogers Hall; New Mexico Highlands University; Las Vegas | Dissemination of Education on New Mexico | | Lloyd Moylan | 1937 | the mural is a fresco | NRHP |
| USPO; Truth or Consequences | Indian Bear Dance | | Boris Deutsch | 1938 | originally installed in Geronimo Springs post office | |

== New York ==
| Location | Mural title | Image | Artist | Date | Notes | NRHP listed |
|---|---|---|---|---|---|---|
| Honeoye Falls | The Life of the Senecas | | Stuart Edie | 1942 | | |
| Scotia | The Glen Family Spared by French and Indians – 1690 | | Amy Jones | 1941 | | |

== North Dakota ==
| Location | Mural title | Image | Artist | Date | Notes | NRHP listed |
|---|---|---|---|---|---|---|
| Langdon | Indians Demanding Wagon Toll | | Leo Beaulaurier | 1939 | | |

== Oklahoma ==
| Location | Mural title | Image | Artist | Date | Notes | NRHP listed |
|---|---|---|---|---|---|---|
| Coalgate | Indian Family at Routine Tasks | | Acee Blue Eagle | 1942 | | |
| USPO; Hugo | The Red Man of Oklahoma Sees the First Stage Coach | | Joseph Amedeus Fleck | 1937 | | |
| USPO; Seminole | Seminole Indian Scene | | Acee Blue Eagle | 1939 | | |

== Texas ==
| Location | Mural title | Image | Artist | Date | Notes | NRHP listed |
|---|---|---|---|---|---|---|
| Caldwell | Indians Moving | | Suzanne Scheuer | 1939 | | |

== Virginia ==
| Location | Mural title | Image | Artist | Date | Notes | NRHP listed |
|---|---|---|---|---|---|---|
| USPO; Arlington | Captain John Smith Meets the Massawomek Indians | | Auriel Bessemer | 1940 | | |
| USPO; Hopewell | Captain Francis Eppes Making Friends with the Appomattox Indians | | Edmund Archer | 1939 | oil on canvas | |
| USPO; Richmond | Pocahontas Saving the Life of Captain John Smith | | Paul Cadmus | 1939 | | |
| Smithfield | Captain John Smith Trading with the Indians | | William Abbott Cheever | 1941 | | |
