= Nell Sinton =

American painter (1910–1997)

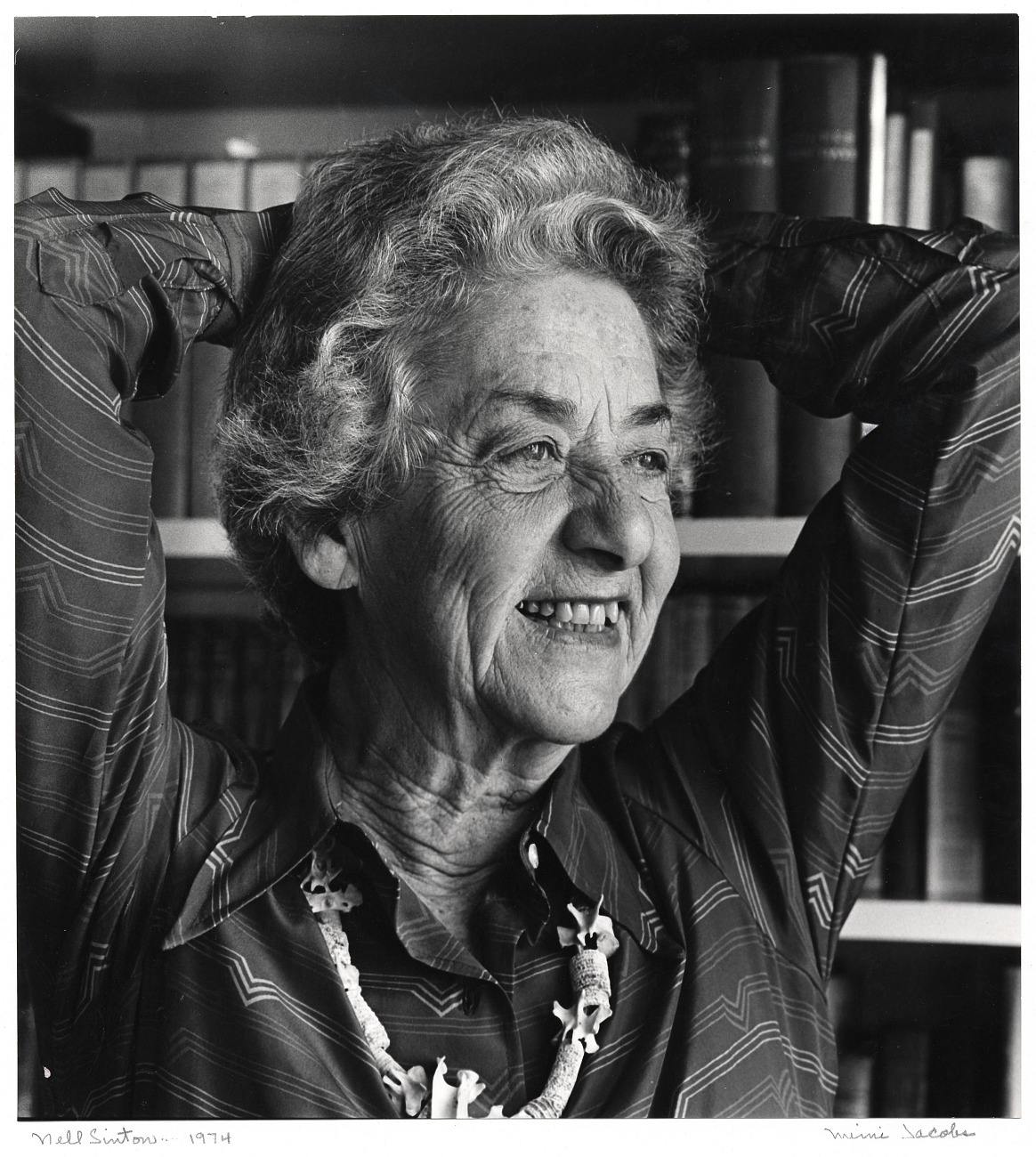
- Sinton in 1974
- Born: Eleanor Walter; June 4, 1910; San Francisco, California, U.S.
- Died: October 23, 1997 (aged 87); San Francisco, California, U.S.
- Education: California School of Fine Arts
- Occupations: Artist, educator, art community leader
- Known for: Abstract paintings, collages
- Movement: Abstract expressionism
- Spouse: Stanley Henry Sinton Jr.
- Children: 3

Eleanor "Nell" Walter Sinton (née Eleanor Walter; 1910–1997) was an American artist, an art community leader, and educator. She was a distinguished San Francisco Bay Area abstract painter and collagist. Sinton served on the San Francisco Arts Commission, and she was one of the Board of Trustees of the San Francisco Art Institute.

== Early life and education ==
Eleanor Walter was born in 1910 in San Francisco, California to a prominent Jewish family active in Congregation Emanu-El. The Walter family ancestors had arrived in San Francisco in 1851, during the Gold Rush. Her parents were Florence (née Schwartz) and John Isidor Walter. Her mother was a master at bookbinding and a member of the Hand Bookbinders of California. Her father worked as a treasurer in the family investment and merchant business, D. N. & E. Walter & Company (David Nathan and Emanuel Walter and Company). Her father served in many local leadership roles, including as the President of the California School of Fine Arts (later known as San Francisco Art Institute). Edgar Melville Walter, was her paternal uncle and he was an architectural sculptor and painter, who studied under Rodin.

Sinton attended Miss Burke's School during high school. Between 1922 and 1923, she attended classes at the California School of Fine Arts (CSFA) on Saturday mornings, before she decided to formally study there. From 1926 until 1928, she studied under Lucien Labaudt at CSFA. In 1938 to 1940, she returned to CSFA to study under Maurice Sterne, whom she also worked with on WPA projects.

== Career ==
Her first solo exhibition was in 1947, and the Raymond and Raymond Gallery in San Francisco. Her first solo museum exhibition was in 1949 at the Legion of Honor in San Francisco. Her earliest works, from the 1940s, were primarily focused on interiors and landscapes. In the 1960s, her work was fully abstract; and by the 1970s she was working in a loose but figurative phase.

Sinton served on the San Francisco Arts Commission from 1959 until 1963, and she was one of the Board of Trustees of the San Francisco Art Institute from 1966 until 1972. From 1974 until 1985, she taught art at the Institute for Creative and Artistic Development (now Creative Growth Art Center) in Oakland.

Mills College in Oakland held a retrospective of her work in 1981.

== Personal life ==
She had married Stanley Henry Sinton Jr., together they had three children.

Sinton had lived at 2520 Divisadero Street, in a Tudor Revival house built in 1933. In 1954, they bought the 1926-built house at 1020 Francisco Street in Russian Hill, San Francisco, which is listed as one of the National Register of Historic Places in San Francisco since December 22, 2011.

== Death and legacy ==
Sinton died on October 23, 1997, in San Francisco. SFGate remembered her as "one of the early California abstract painters".

Her artwork is in museum collections, including San Francisco Museum of Modern Art (SFMoMA); the Krannert Art Museum in Champaign, Illinois; and the Oakland Museum of California (OMCA). She also has files held at the Archives of American Art (a Smithsonian Institution), and the Bancroft Library.

== Exhibitions ==
- 1947 – solo exhibition, Raymond and Raymond Gallery, San Francisco, California
- 1949 – solo exhibition, Legion of Honor, San Francisco, California
- 1952 – group exhibition, Metropolitan Museum of Art, New York City, New York
- 1962 – solo exhibition, Bolles Gallery, New York City, New York
- 1963 – "Corridor: Fred Martin, Roy De Forest, Tony DeLap, Nell Sinton," San Francisco Museum of Modern Art, San Francisco, California
- 1981 – solo exhibition retrospective, Mills College, Oakland, California
- 1987 – "Early Works: Nell Sinton," solo exhibition, Braunstein/Quay Gallery, San Francisco, California
