= Lucien Labaudt =

French-American painter

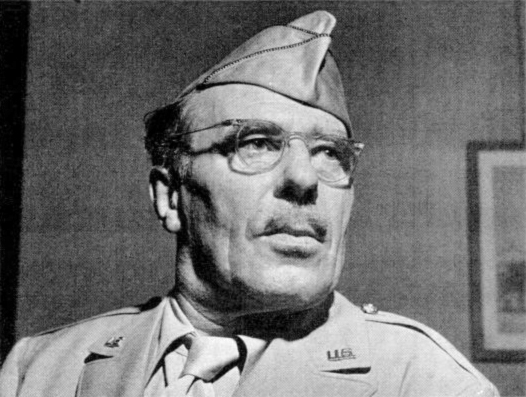
- Life artist-correspondent Lucien Lambaudt (December 1943)
- Born: Lucien Adolphe Labaudt; May 14, 1880; Paris, France
- Died: December 12, 1943 (aged 63); Assam, India
- Occupations: Painter, educator, muralist, artist-news correspondent

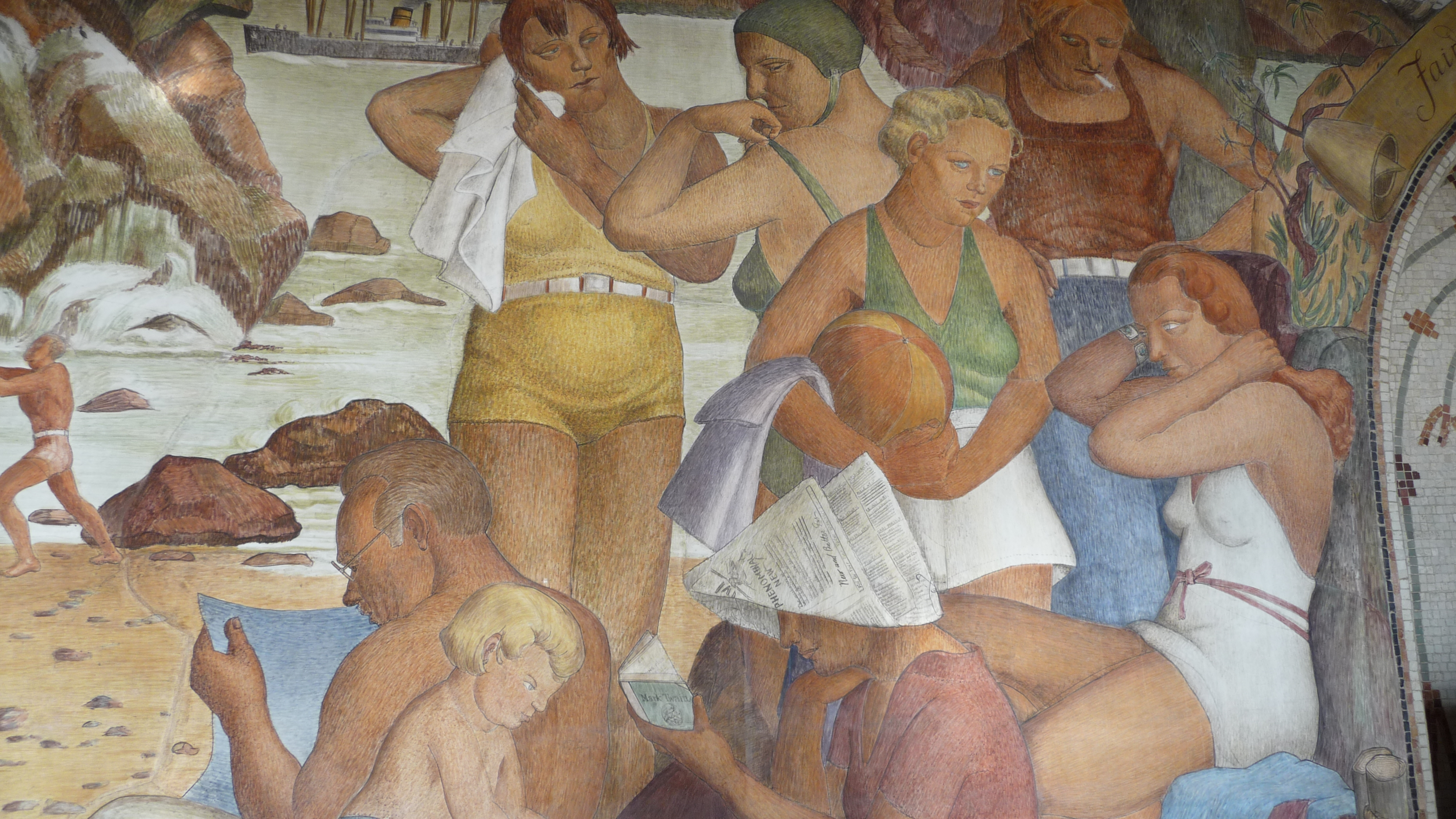
Detail of one of Labaudt's frescos at the Beach Chalet in Golden Gate Park, created for the Federal Art Project (1936–1937)

Lucien Adolphe Labaudt (May 14, 1880 – December 12, 1943) was a French-born American painter based in San Francisco, California. His best-known work may be Powell Street (1934), a mural in fresco at Coit Tower that he created for the Public Works of Art Project.

== Biography ==
Labaudt was born in Paris on May 14, 1880. In 1906, he emigrated to the United States and first settled in Nashville, Tennessee. In 1910, he moved to San Francisco in a studio. In 1919, Labaudt started teaching at the California School of Fine Arts. One of his students was painter Nell Sinton.

He painted two murals in the lobby of the Spring Street Courthouse in Los Angeles: Life on the Old Spanish and American Ranchos in 1938 and Aerodynamism in 1941.

Labaudt was one of a select number of civilian artists invited to join the United States Army Art Program in World War II. He was appointed to the program in April 1943, and assigned to the China Burma India Theater. When the Army's War Art Unit was abruptly eliminated by Congress, he joined the war art program of Life magazine. He left Los Angeles for India in September 1943, traveling for two months aboard a Liberty ship carrying a cargo of dynamite. He was killed in a plane crash in Assam on December 12, 1943, en route to China, where he had been assigned to capture scenes of guerrilla warfare. Labaudt was the first war correspondent killed in that theatre and the only Life artist-correspondent to die in the war. None of his sketches or personal effects survived.

== Legacy ==
A Liberty ship named the SS Lucien Labaudt was christened at Richmond Shipyards on April 7, 1944.

In 1946, Labaudt's widow Marcelle opened the Lucien Labaudt Art Gallery at 1407 Gough Street in San Francisco. His work can be seen at the San Francisco Museum of Modern Art.
