= Louis Bouché =

American painter

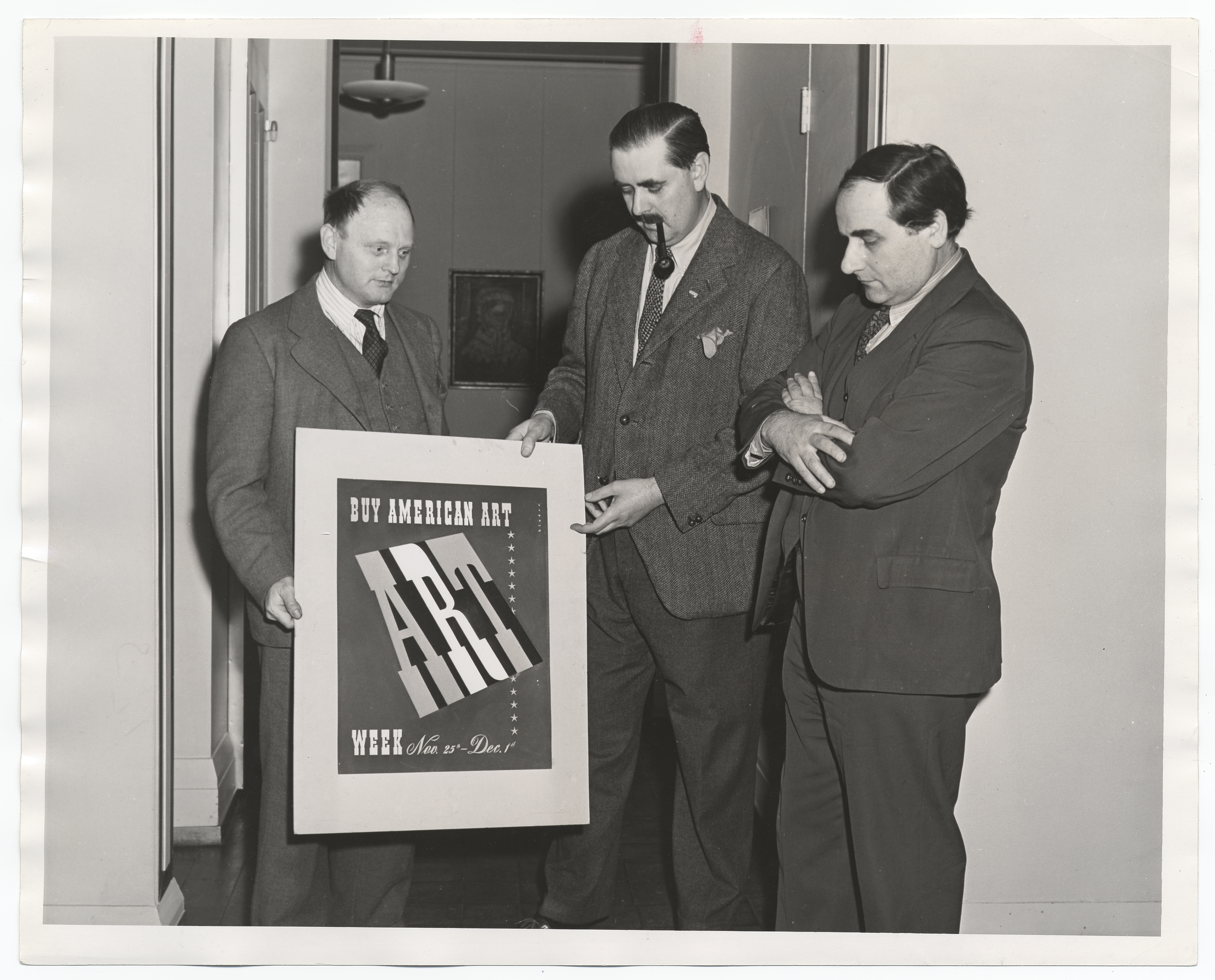
Louis Bouche (center), with Reginald Marsh and William Zorach

Louis George Bouché (March 18, 1896 – August 7, 1969) was an American artist, muralist, and decorator. He was a 1933 Guggenheim Fellow.

== Life ==
Bouché was born in New York City. He traveled to Paris at age thirteen in 1909 to live with family and studied at the Lycée Carnot, Académie Colarossi, and the Académie de la Grande Chaumière. He studied at the Art Students League of New York in 1915, with Dimitri Romanovsky and Frank Vincent DuMond. In 1921 he married Marian. Bouché curated an art gallery in Wanamaker's department store, from 1922 to 1926.

== Murals ==
He painted murals for the Pennsylvania Railroad and Radio City Music Hall. He designed club cars for the Pennsylvania Railroad. and was a member of the Federal Art Project.

Bouché was commissioned to paint murals at the Eisenhower Presidential Museum, Stewart Lee Udall Department of the Interior Building, Robert F. Kennedy Department of Justice Building and the Ellenville, New York, post office. His art is held by the U.S. State Department, the Museum of Modern Art, Whitney Museum of American Art, the Los Angeles County Museum of Art, and The Phillips Collection.

He taught at the Art Students League in New York, University of Cincinnati, and Drake University. His papers are held by the Archives of American Art.

Louis Bouché died on August 7, 1969, in Pittsfield, Massachusetts.
