= Edgar Britton =

American painter 1901–1982

Britton's mural Petroleum Industry: Distribution & Use, on display at the Department of the Interior in Washington, D.C.

Edgar Britton (1901-1982) was an American painter, muralist and sculptor born in Kearney, Nebraska. He studied with Grant Wood at the University of Iowa, and he moved to Chicago where he studied and worked with Edgar Miller. There he began painting murals, many as WPA projects.

For reasons of his health (he was diagnosed with tuberculosis), Britton relocated to Colorado in the early 1940s where he taught at the Colorado Springs Fine Arts Center until 1951.

== Gallery ==
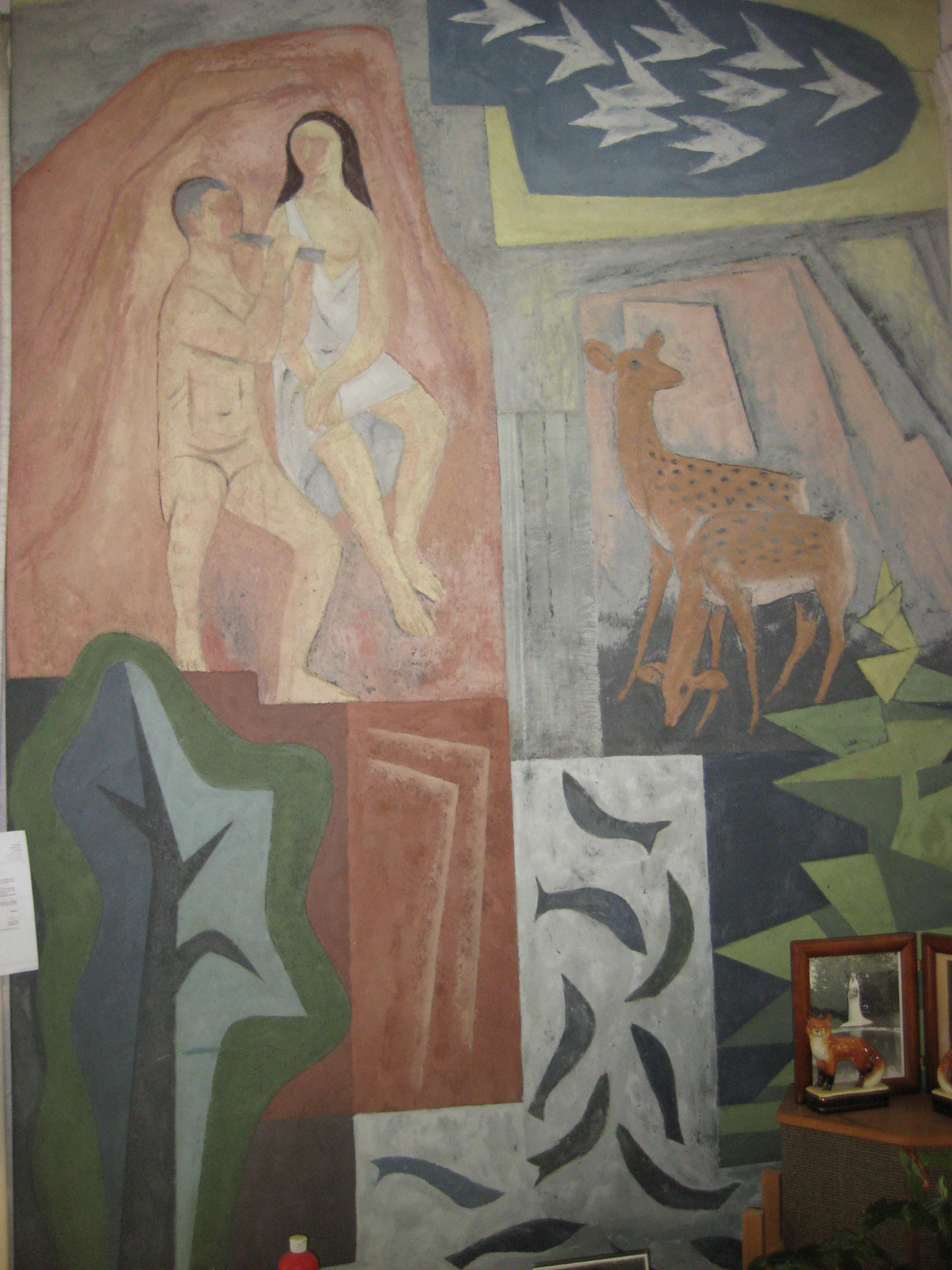
Orpheus and Eurydice, c. 1950, Colorado Springs, Colorado

Petroleum Industry - Production, mural, Department of the Interior, Washington, D.C., 1939

Petroleum Industry - Distribution & Use, mural, Department of the Interior, Washington, D.C., 1939

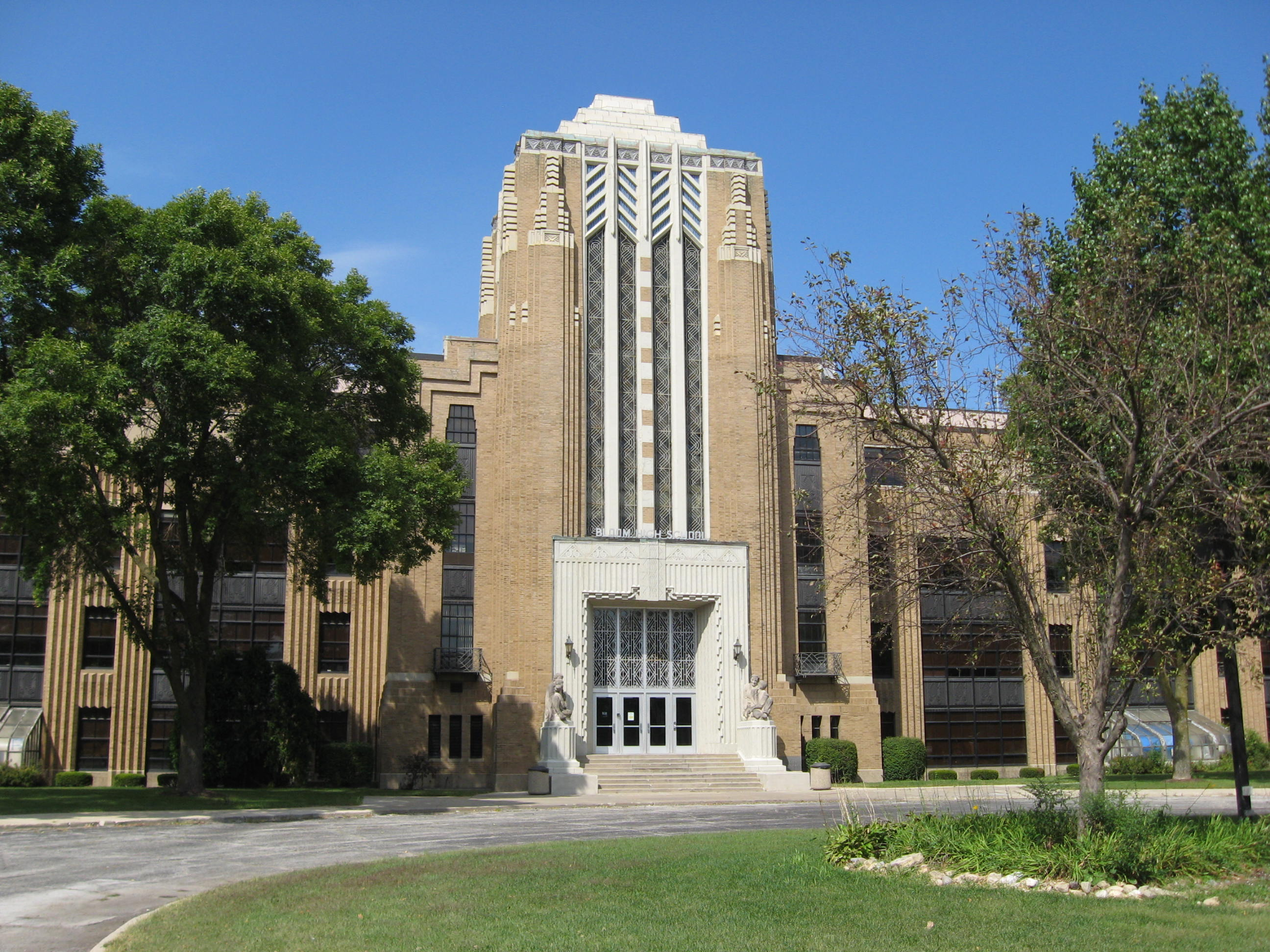
Art Deco frescoes by Britton at front entrance of Bloom High School, Chicago Heights, Illinois, 1935
