= Beach Chalet =

Historic building in San Francisco

- U.S. National Register of Historic Places
- San Francisco Designated Landmark
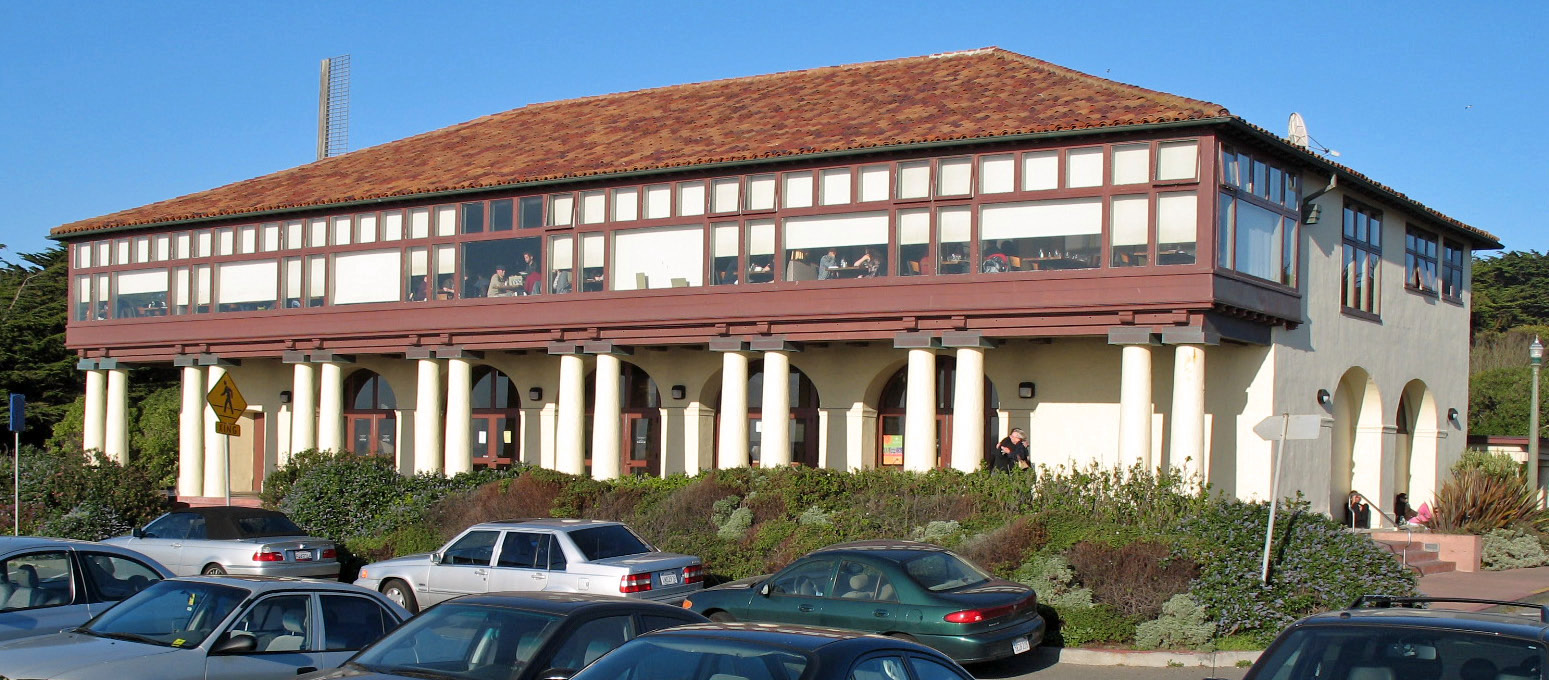

- Location within San Francisco County Location within California Location within the United States
- Location: 1000 Great Highway, San Francisco, California, U.S.
- Coordinates: 37°46′10″N 122°30′36″W
- Area: less than one acre
- Built: 1925
- Architect: Willis Polk
- Architectural style: Spanish Colonial Revival Style architecture
- NRHP reference No.: 81000172
- SFDL No.: 179

Significant dates
- Added to NRHP: July 22, 1981
- Designated SFDL: February 22, 1985

The Beach Chalet is a historic two-story Spanish Colonial Revival-style building, located at the far western end of Golden Gate Park in San Francisco. The building is owned by the San Francisco Recreation & Parks Department; and the tenants are the Beach Chalet Brewery and Restaurant, and the Park Chalet.

The building is listed as a San Francisco Designated Landmark since February 22, 1985; and listed in the National Register of Historic Places, since July 22, 1981.

== History ==
The building was designed by architect Willis Polk, and opened in 1925 as a city-run restaurant and included changing rooms for beach visitors. The Beach Chalet is located near the Dutch Windmill in Golden Gate Park. It replaced an older building called the Golden Gate Park Chalet, built in 1892, that had stood on the opposite side of the Great Highway.

=== Derelict ===
The building was taken over by the United States Army as a coastal defense headquarters during World War II. After the war, the city leased the Beach Chalet to the Veterans of Foreign Wars (VFW) for $50 a month. The VFW moved out after the city bumped the rent to $500 a month in 1979.

The location, remote from downtown San Francisco, drew complaints regarding "rotten performances and nauseating spectacles". A "smoker" party held there in 1952 featured gambling, strippers and lewd films; Salvatore (Tarbaby) Terrano of the Waxey Gordon narcotics ring was arrested following the event. After the VFW moved out, the derelict Beach Chalet was occupied by homeless people and cats and nearly was destroyed by fire before a padlocked fence was erected.

=== Restaurant ===
After several years of closure and following a renovation completed in 1996, the building now houses the Beach Chalet Brewery and Restaurant on the second floor, opened by Lara and Gar Truppelli and Timon Malloy. Its sister restaurant, the Park Chalet, is located to the back of the Beach Chalet with a dining room facing the park and outdoor dining on a terrace and lawn area.

== Art ==
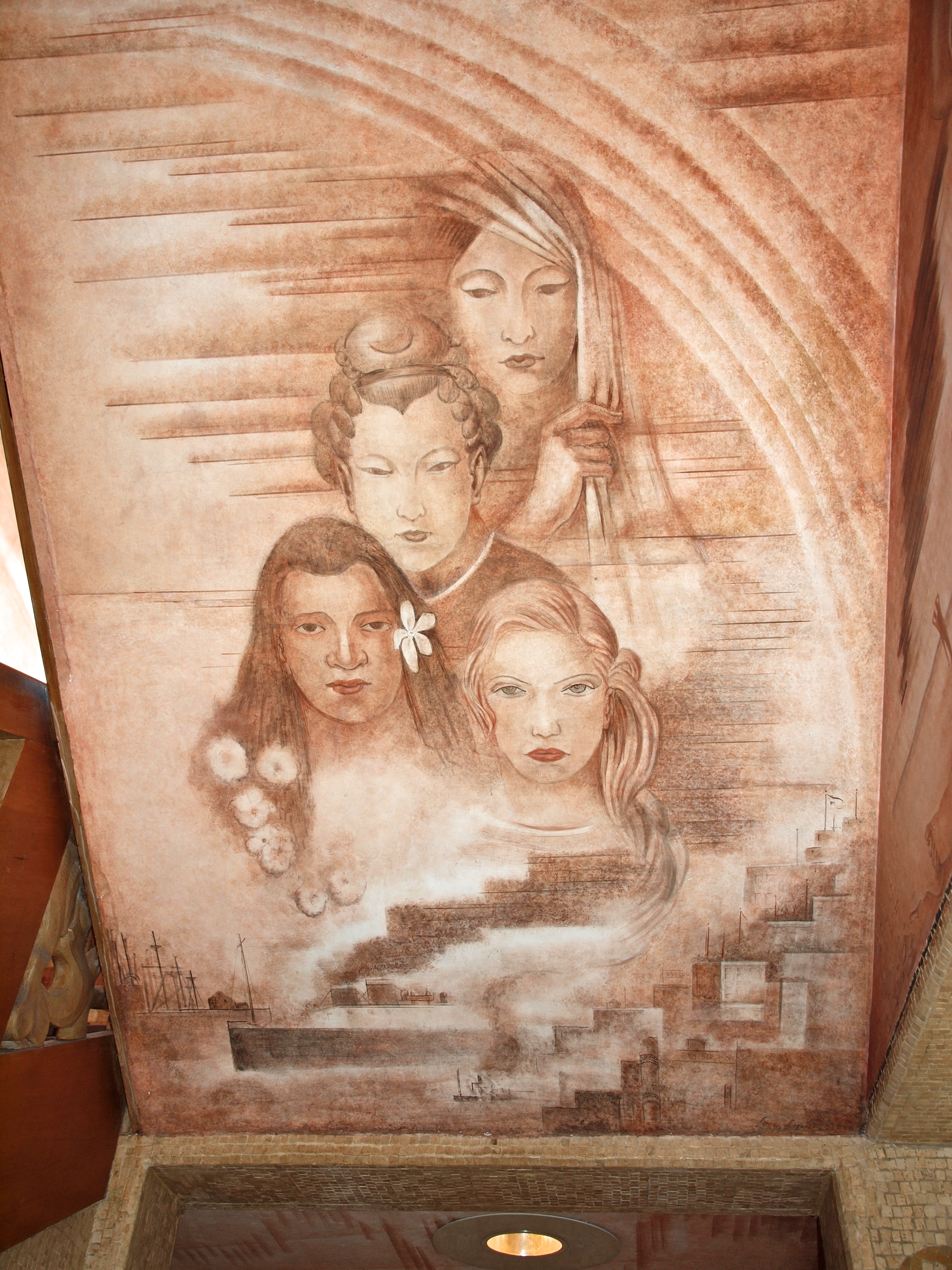
Upstairs monochrome mural (Labaudt)

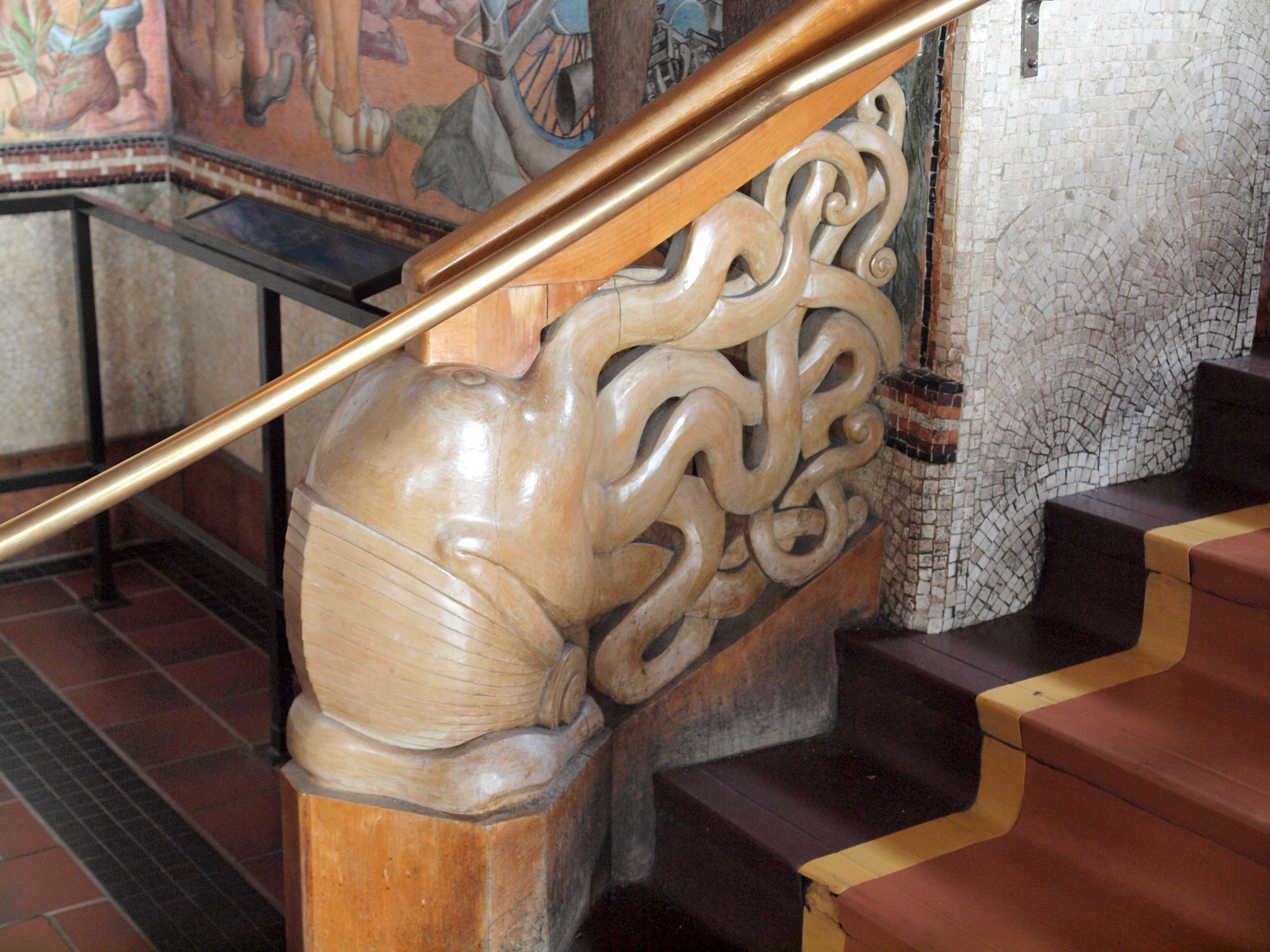
Sea Creatures (von Meyer)

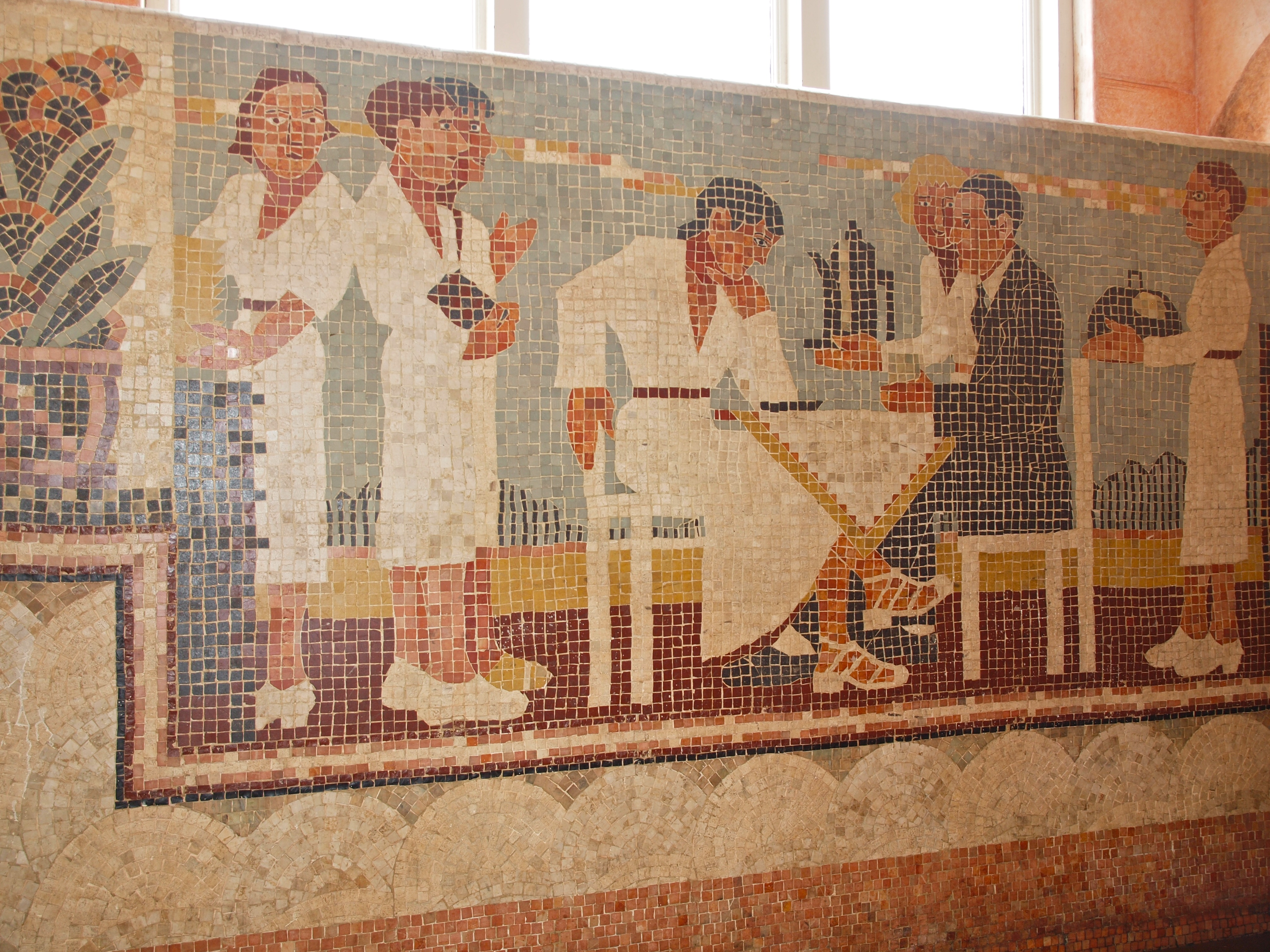
Mosaic (Caredio)

The Beach Chalet has three major works of art added in 1936 and 1937 as Works Progress Administration (WPA) projects

1. San Francisco Life, a major mural by Lucien Labaudt at the entrance hall; Labaudt also painted monochrome frescoes in the stairwell and restroom hallway.
2. Sea Creatures, a series of carved magnolia wood panels for the staircase by Michael von Meyer
3. Mosaics designed by Labaudt and executed by Primo Caredio

=== San Francisco Life mural ===
San Francisco Life diagram. The main entrance to the lobby is through the center archway in the west wall.

Lucien Labaudt painted the elaborate San Francisco Life fresco mural in 1936 and 1937. The mural extends from the top of the wainscot to the ceiling of the first floor entrance lobby and wraps around all four walls, split into nine sections, each approximately 9 ft (2.7 m) tall and covering an aggregate area of 1,500 ft^{2} (140 m^{2}). It depicts real people and scenes from San Francisco in the 1930s, encompassing the beach, Golden Gate Park, Fisherman's Wharf, and the Marina District.

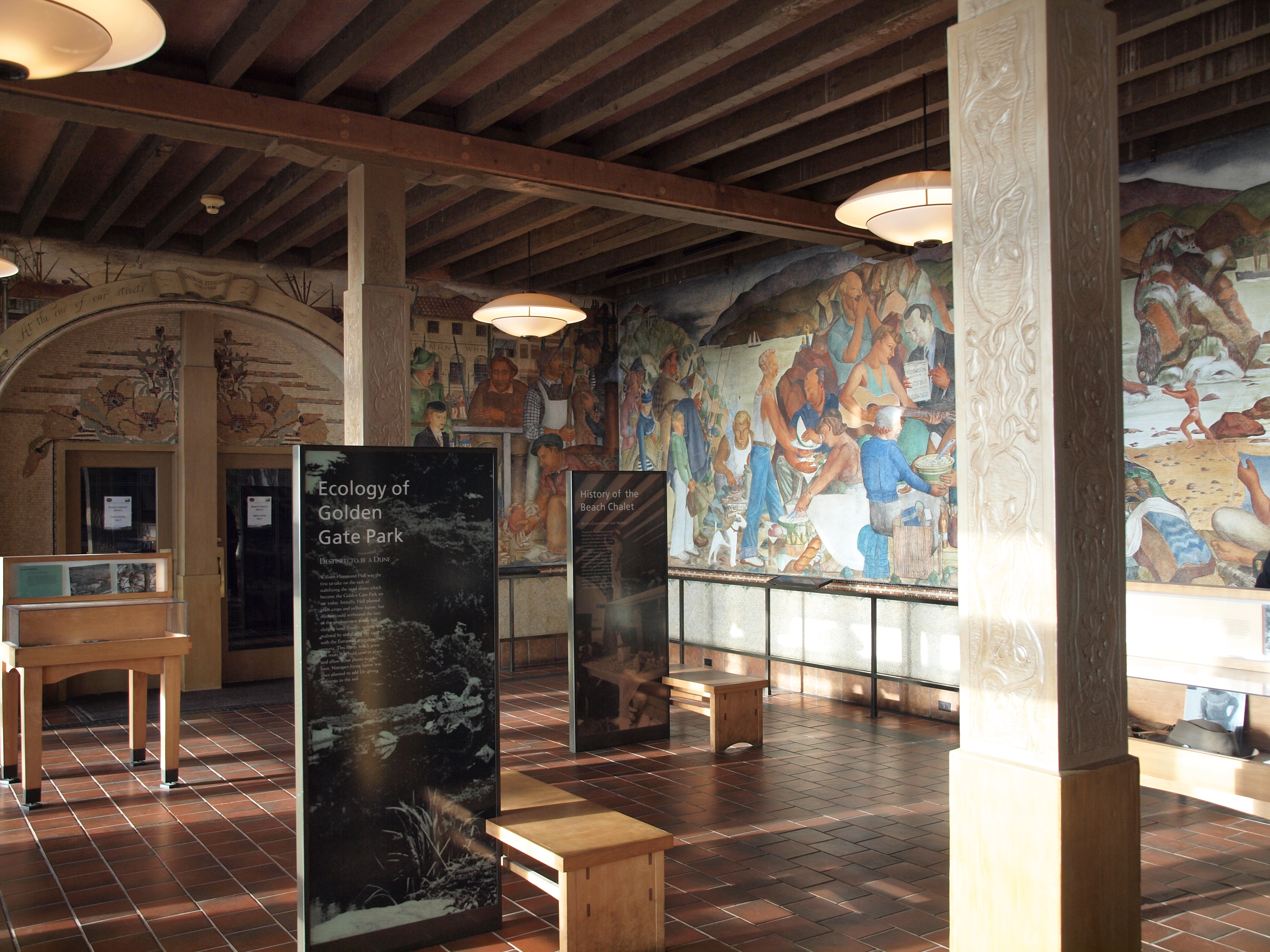
Golden Gate Park Visitor Center lobby, view directed northeast

Many of the figures depicted are artists, patrons, and WPA administrators that Labaudt knew; unlike the more radical murals at Coit Tower, art history professor Anthony Lee wrote "The Beach Chalet only confirmed [Labaudt's] return to the fold. Its rigorous symmetry and compositional concision, its playful but unabashed kowtowing, its scenes of relaxed pleasure and unproblematic display of the city's entertainment spots, its purposeful omission of any Artists' Union painters — all these run counter to the visual language of his Coit Tower mural." There are four quotations from local poets painted over each doorway.

San Francisco Life by Lucien Labaudt
Quote	Sec'n	Neighborhood(s) depicted	Thumbnail	Wall	Notes	Refs.
"At the end of our streets — the stars" (George Sterling)	1	Embarcadero		North, west half		
"At the end of our streets — the stars" (George Sterling)	2	Fisherman's Wharf		North, east half	Primo Caredio depicted mending a net	
"Fair City of my love — and my desire" (Ina Coolbrith)	3	Baker Beach		East, north half	Depicts Labaudt's nephew, Bill Chamberlain (walking a dog) and daughters Yliane (playing guitar) and Alwyne (cutting watermelon); also shows fresco assistants Arnold Bray and Farrell Dwyer with sculptor Robert Howard (playing harmonica). Includes self-portrait of Labaudt (seated, studying paper) and his wife (receiving potato salad and again, in green bathing suit).	
"Fair City of my love — and my desire" (Ina Coolbrith)	4	Golden Gate Park		East, south half	Includes Conservatory of Flowers and de Young Museum along with Beatrice Judd Ryan (art student), Ben Cunningham, Arnold Bray, Spencer Macky (holding leashed dog), Joseph Danysh (on white horse), Benny Bufano (on dark horse), Bill Gaskin, Phil Sears, Dorothy Collins, John McLaren (seated on bench), Jack Spring (holding redwood sapling), and Bohemian Club members (Lorser Feitelson and Helen Lundeberg, behind woman with tennis racket).	
"Sails are furl'd — from farthest corners of the world" (Joaquin Miller)	5	Lands End		South, east half	Includes Labaudt's wife (white coat).	
"Sails are furl'd — from farthest corners of the world" (Joaquin Miller)	6	Marina District		South, west half	Gottardo Piazonni shown in fedora.	
"Serene, indifferent of fate thou sittest at the Western Gate" (Bret Harte)	7	Civic Center		West, southernmost pillar	Coit Tower architect Arthur Brown Jr., shown with plans in front of San Francisco City Hall dome.	
"Serene, indifferent of fate thou sittest at the Western Gate" (Bret Harte)	8	Union Square		West, two center pillars (flanking entrance)		
"Serene, indifferent of fate thou sittest at the Western Gate" (Bret Harte)	9	Chinatown		West, northernmost pillar		

In 1981, Restoration Associates pledged to restore the mural as part of a thirty-year lease on the property. The mural room is now the San Francisco Visitor Center. The Beach Chalet murals appear in the Michael Apted film, Class Action (1991).

Details of Lucien Labaudt's San Francisco Life mural at Beach Chalet

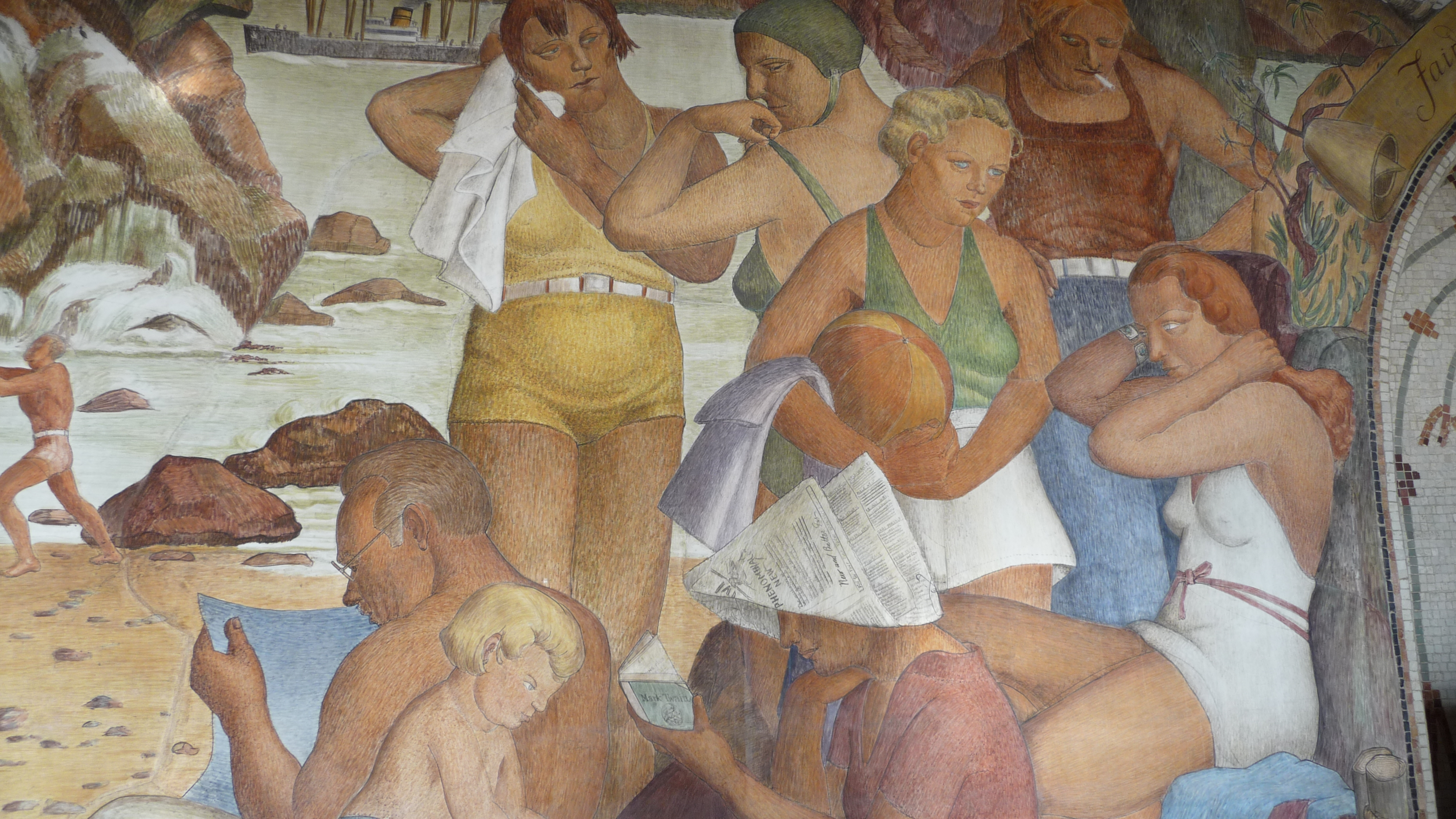
Labaudt (seated, studying paper) at Baker Beach (north end of east wall)

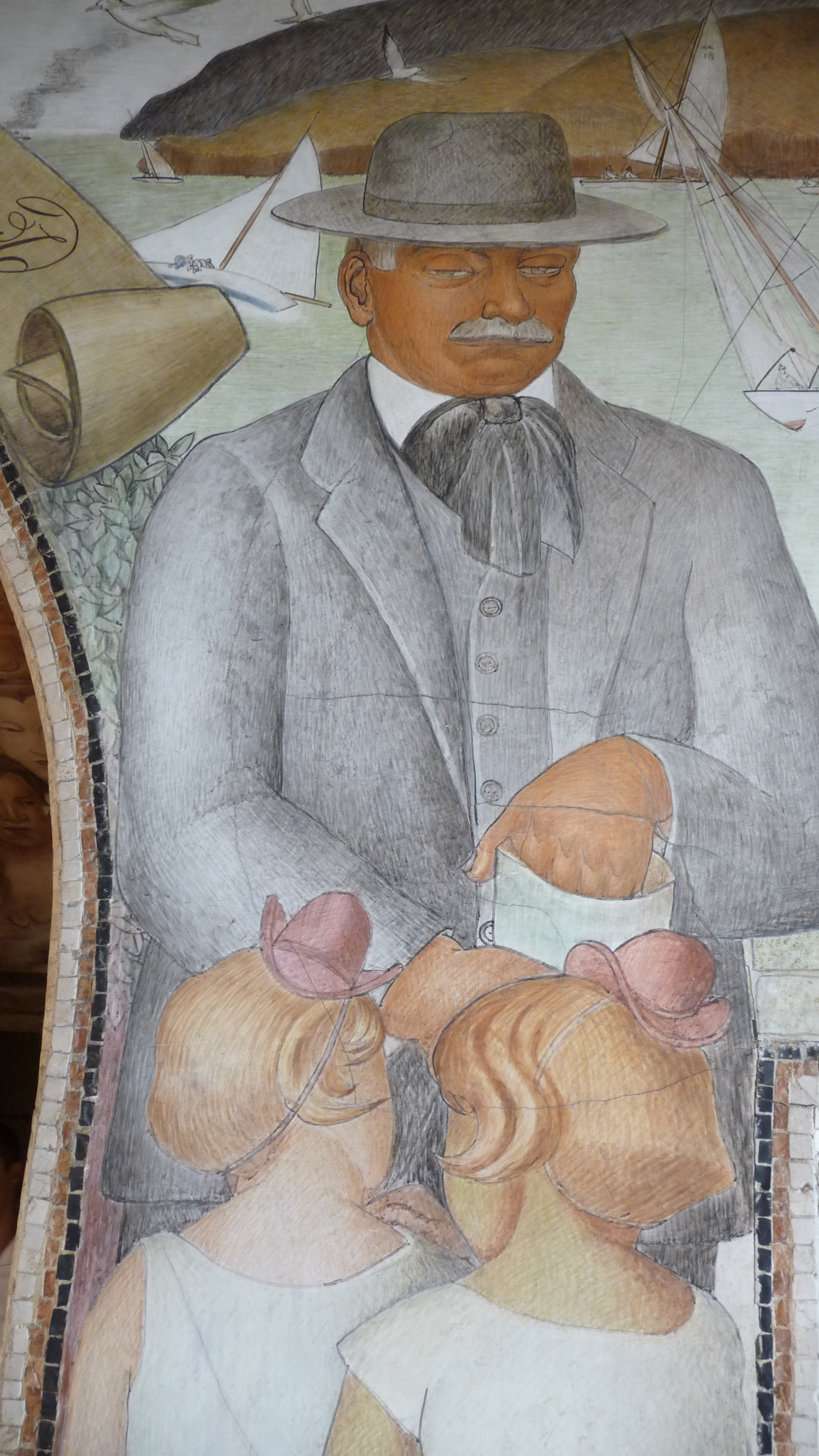
Gottardo Piazonni in the Marina (west end of south wall)

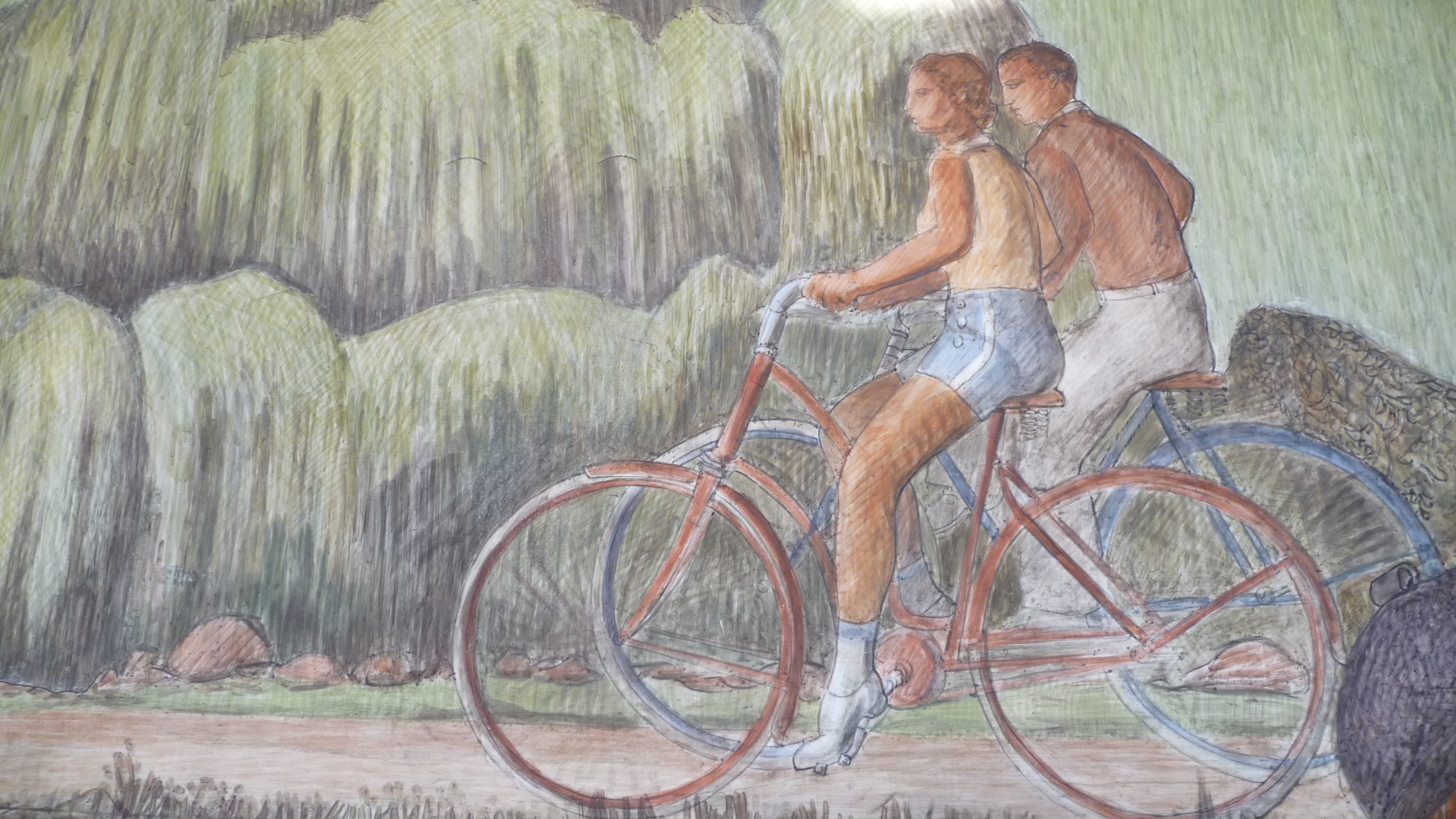
Bicyclists in Golden Gate Park (south end of east wall)

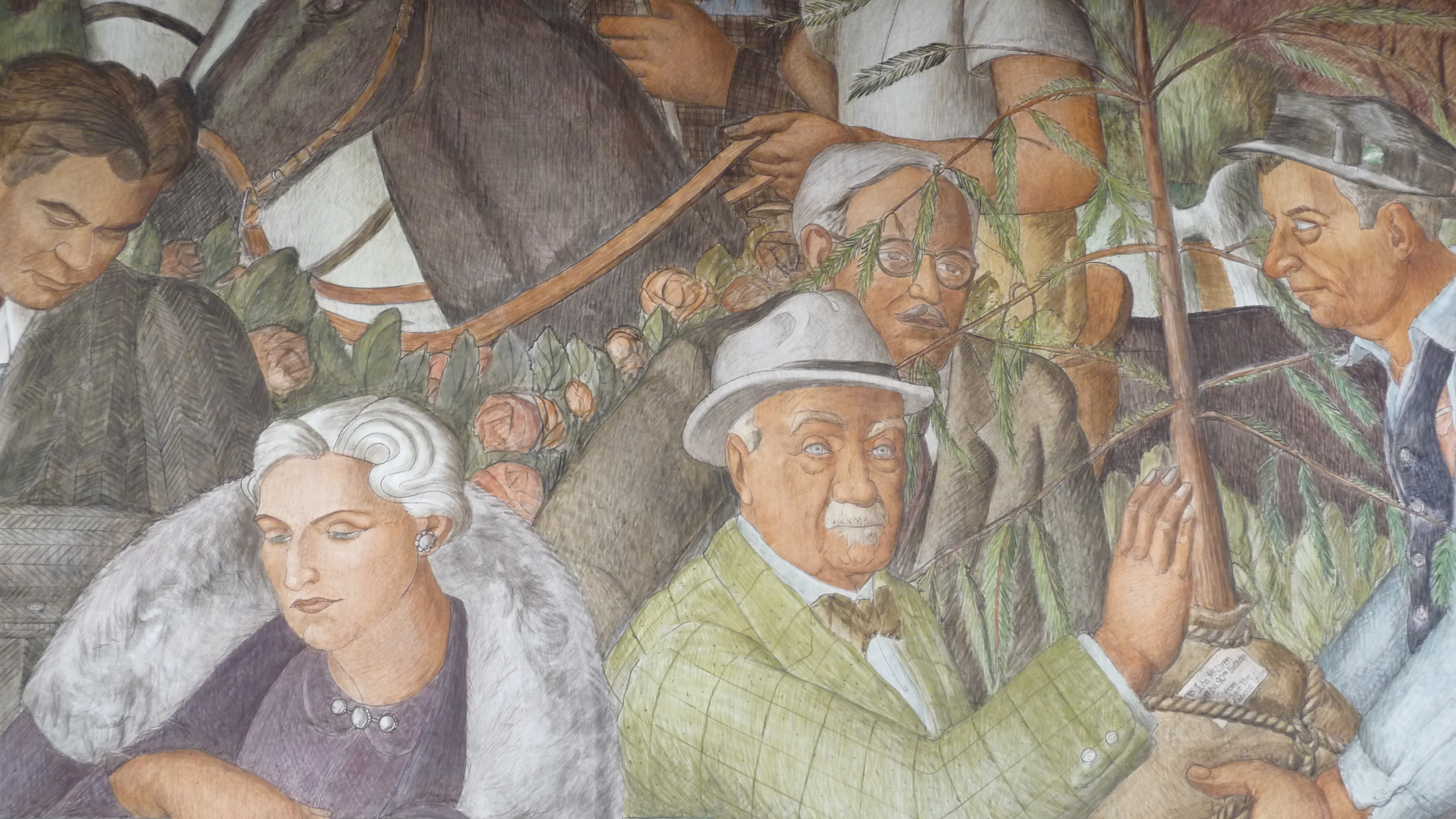
John McLaren seated on bench in Golden Gate Park (south end of east wall)

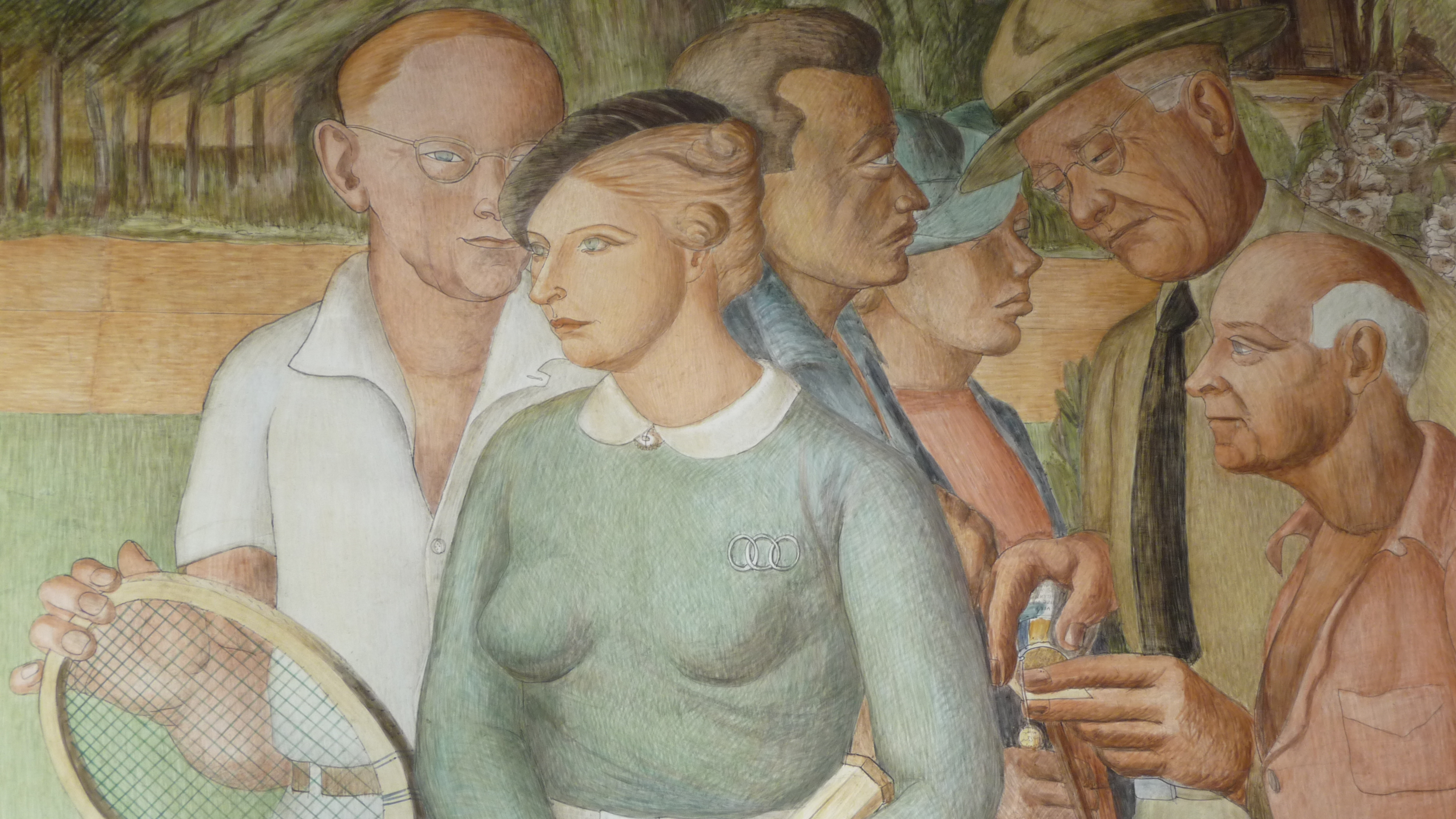
Bohemian Club members in Golden Gate Park (south end of east wall)

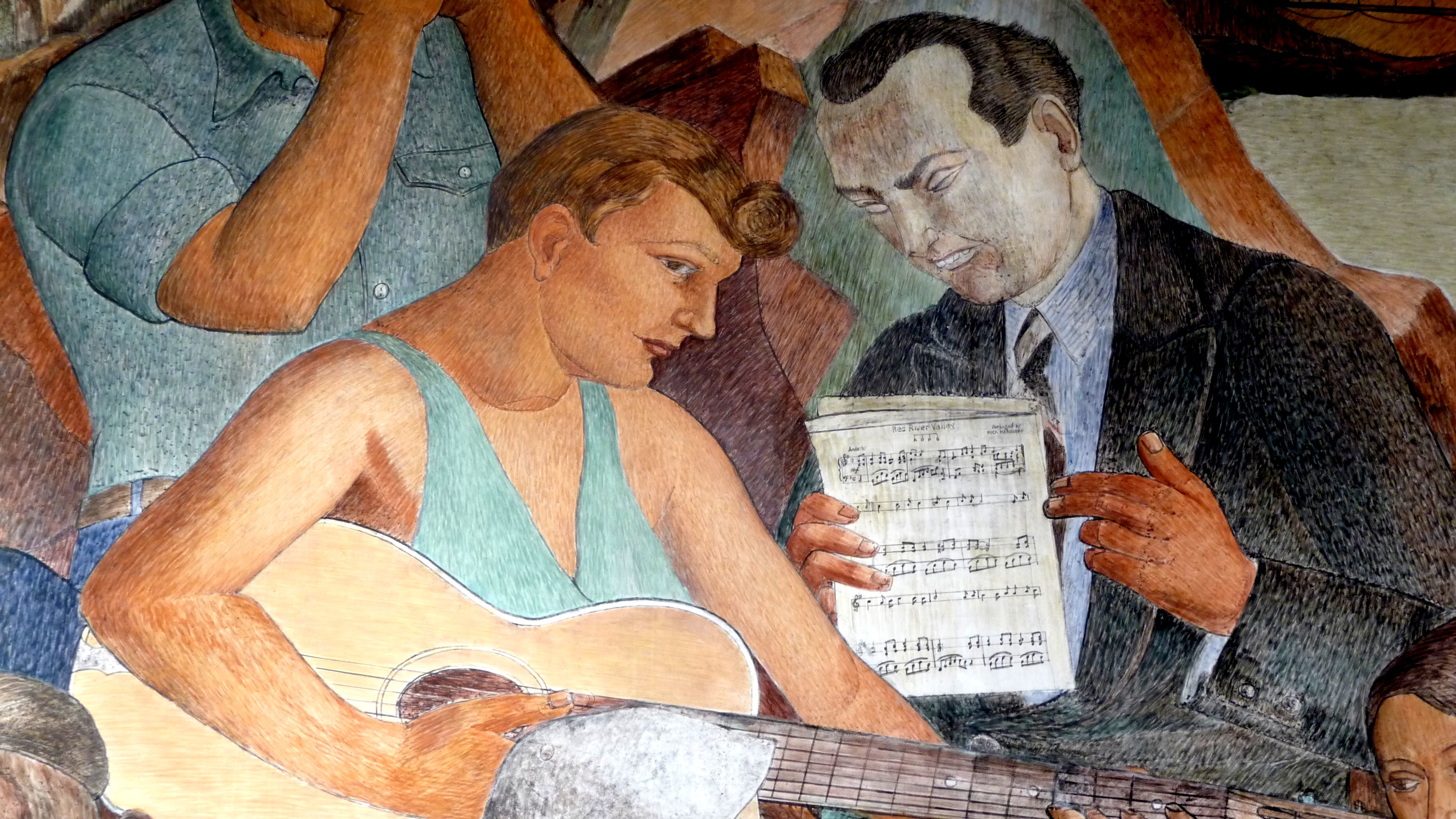
Labaudt's daughter Yliane plays a guitar at Baker Beach (north end of east wall)

== See also ==
- List of San Francisco Designated Landmarks
- National Register of Historic Places listings in San Francisco
