= John Augustus Walker =

American painter (1901–1967)

John Augustus Walker (1901–1967) was an American artist based in the Gulf Coast in Alabama. He was commissioned to undertake several art projects for the Works Progress Administration during the Depression era.

== Early life ==
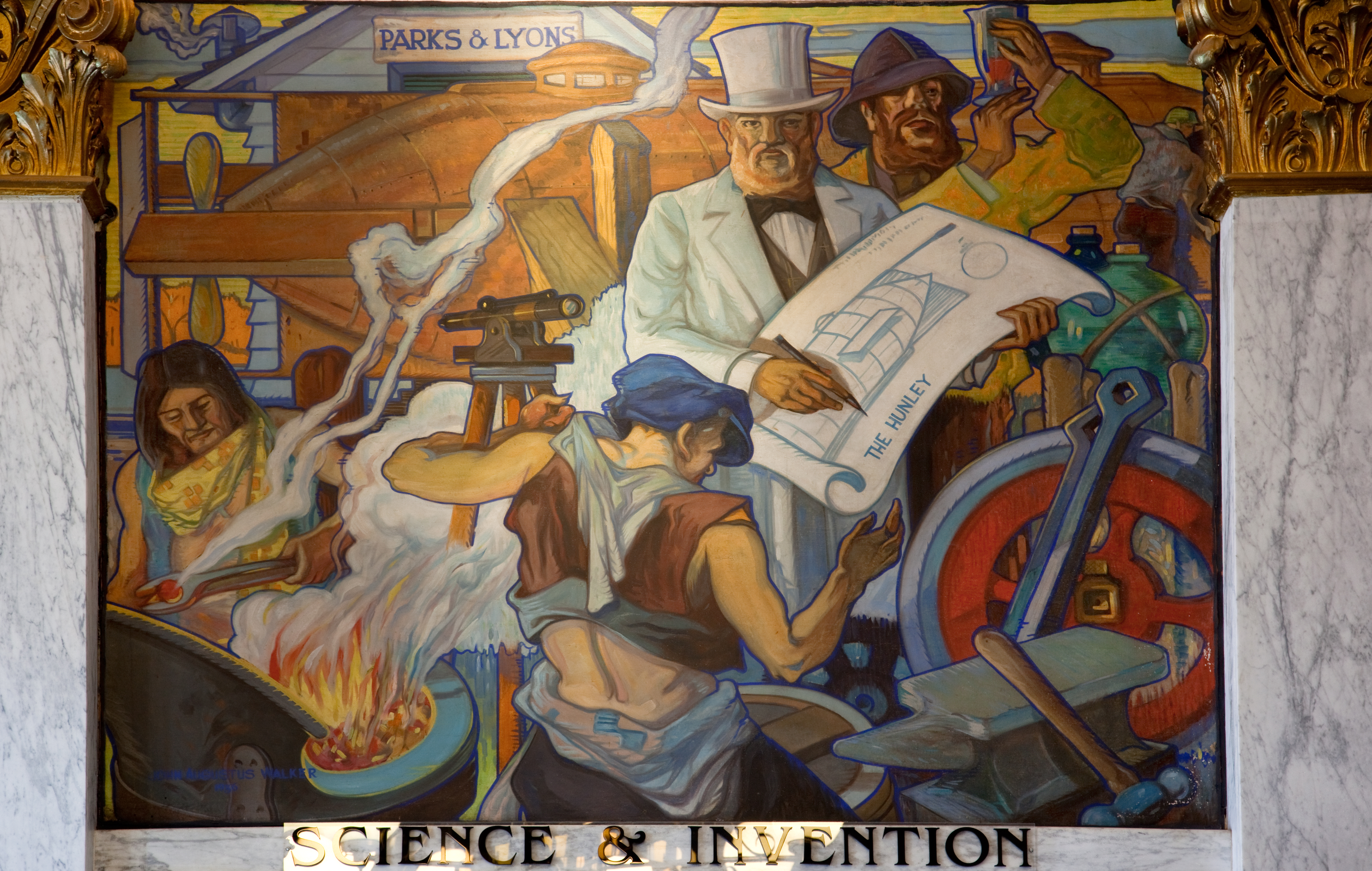
A 1935 mural by Walker at the History Museum of Mobile in Alabama

Born in Mobile, Alabama, Walker was encouraged to become an artist by his elementary school teacher Mayme Simpson. At an early age, he became the family breadwinner, working from 1 p.m. to 1 a.m. daily for the Mobile & Ohio Freight Department and limiting his sleep to devote more time to the study of drawing and painting.

He began his studies under Edmund C. DeCelle (misspelled in his letter as "Cecile") of Mobile. A company-ordered transfer to St. Louis enabled Walker to enroll in the St. Louis School of Fine Arts, where he studied under the direction of Victor Holm, Edmund H. Wuerpel, and Fred Green Carpenter. After six years of study, he spent several more years studying art in New York City and Chicago. Walker was also influenced by the work of Frank Brangwyn.

According to a biography submitted to the University of Alabama in 1935, Walker exhibited his work at the fourteenth annual St. Louis Artists Guild Exhibition in 1926, followed by a "two-man" exhibition in Mobile in 1929 and a "one-man" exhibition at the Woman's Club in Mobile in 1933. Both Mobile exhibitions were sponsored by Allied Arts Guild of Mobile. The Woman's Club exhibition received the following review in the Mobile Press-Register:

The watercolors of John Augustus Walker on exhibition at the Woman's Club House are among the most beautiful ever seen in Mobile. Exquisitely delicate in handling and coloring, they are an outpouring of the sensitivity and poetic spirit in which John Walker reacts to a beauty which is everywhere – a beauty from which so many now choose to turn away, seeking instead a sordid viewpoint. After all, it is with the spirit with which one sees – and in these watercolors John Walker translates transcendent beauty.

== Works ==
Walker worked long hours in his North Royal Street studio in Mobile. His paintings focused on bright colors, an interest he acquired from trips to Cuba and Key West and reinforced with subsequent trips throughout the United States and Gulf Coast region. Heavy dark outlines and painterly brushwork characterized both his commercial and public works. Walker's subject matter ranged from fantasy and historical themes to landscapes and portraiture. Walker also designed floats, stage sets, and costumes for Mardi Gras. Many of his float designs are displayed in museums.

His watercolors are held in collections throughout the Alabama Gulf Coast region. His notable works along the Gulf Coast include murals in the old City Hall building in Mobile (now the History Museum of Mobile), the Smith Bakery murals on Dauphin Street in Mobile (now lost), and his mural designs for the Federal Building Courtroom. Walker's paintings also are displayed in public schools throughout the state. Many of Walker's works earned local, state, and national awards. Walker was a founder and original member of the Mobile Art Guild, which he also served as an instructor.

Walker created the Historical Panorama of Alabama Agriculture, funded by the Works Progress Administration and commissioned by the Alabama Extension Service (now Alabama Cooperative Extension System) for exhibition at the 1939 Alabama State Fair. Walker was originally contracted to paint 29 murals, but time constraints limited him to ten. Assuming the paintings would be temporary, Walker used tempera water-color paints rather than costlier, more durable oils, which were his preferred medium.

Following exhibition at the Alabama State Fair, the paintings were shipped to Shreveport for display at the 1939 Louisiana State Fair. Afterward, they were shipped to Auburn University (at the time Alabama Polytechnic Institute) in Auburn and stored in the Duncan Hall attic for almost half a century before they were rediscovered in the 1980s and refurbished. Although designed to be temporary, these murals have been preserved by the Alabama Cooperative Extension System and are recognized as examples of WPA-related art from the Great Depression era.
