= Nicolai Cikovsky =

American painter (1894–1985)

- Desert, Department of Interior Building, Washington, D.C.
- Born: Николай Степанович Циковский; December 10, 1894; Pinsk, Russian Empire (modern Belarus)
- Died: May 6, 1985 (aged 90); New York

Nicolai Stepanovich Cikovsky (December 10, 1894 – May 6, 1985) was an American painter. His work is held at the Whitney, MoMA, the Brooklyn Museum and the Pennsylvania Academy of the Fine Arts. He also had three New Deal-era Treasury Section of Fine Arts commissions for public buildings: two murals at Maryland post offices and a set of the murals at the Interior Building in Washington, D.C.

Born "near the Polish border," Cikovsky emigrated from Pinsk to the United States in 1923. He published a number of pieces in proletarian (Communist) journals like New Masses and International Literature in the 1930s. He was a member of the John Reed Club and showed landscapes at the Whitney. Cikovsky was a resident at Yaddo in 1931. Cikovsky was one of the Soviet émigré painters who formed the Hampton Bays Art Group. Other members of the group were David Burliuk, Arshile Gorky, Moses Soyer, Raphael Soyer, John D. Graham, George Constant, and Milton Avery. Originally producing slightly abstracted images, by the late 1940s Cikovsky had moved toward naturalism. Cikovsky died in Washington, D.C. at age 90.

Nicolai Cikovsky Jr. (1933–2016) was a noted art historian and curator at the National Gallery of Art.
