= Henry E. Legler Regional Branch of the Chicago Public Library =

- U.S. National Register of Historic Places
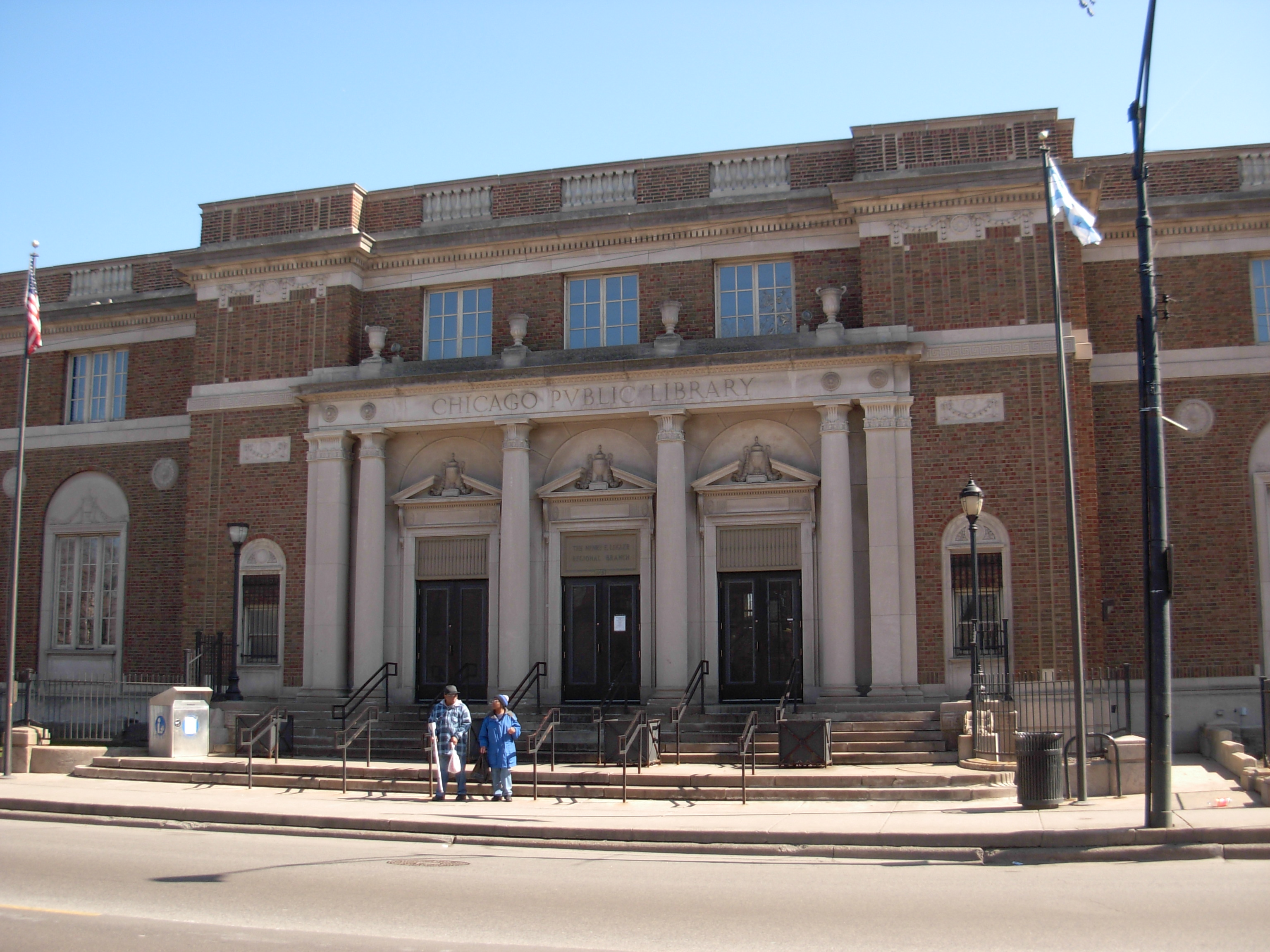

- Location within Chicago metropolitan area Location within Illinois Location within the United States
- Location: 115 S. Pulaski Rd., Chicago, Illinois
- Coordinates: 41°52′46″N 87°43′31″W
- Area: less than one acre
- Built: 1919
- Architect: Alfred S. Alschuler
- Architectural style: Beaux Arts
- NRHP reference No.: 86003169
- Added to NRHP: November 6, 1986

The Henry E. Legler Regional Branch of the Chicago Public Library, also called the Legler Library, the Legler Regional Library, or the Legler Branch, is a branch of the Chicago Public Library located at 115 S. Pulaski Road in the West Garfield Park community area of Chicago, Illinois. The library was built in 1919 and opened on October 11, 1920; it was the first regional library in Chicago. Chicago architect Alfred S. Alschuler designed the building in the Beaux Arts style. A Works Progress Administration mural in the library depicts Jacques Marquette and Native American traders during Marquette's visit to the Chicago area.

The Legler Library originally served an affluent Jewish community. However, as the demographics of West Garfield Park shifted, it ultimately came to serve a poor and underprivileged African-American population. The Chicago Public Library removed the Legler Library's status as a regional library in 1977, at a time when circulation was dropping at the library. The branch was rededicated in 1993 following a renovation.

The library was added to the National Register of Historic Places on November 6, 1986.

In 2019 the library regained regional status. In 2020, it reopened after a yearlong, $11 million renovation, which added recording and artist studios, computer and maker labs, and a wellness room.
