= Suzanne Scheuer =

American painter (1898–1984)

- Born: February 11, 1898; San Jose, California, U.S.
- Died: December 20, 1984 (aged 86); Santa Cruz, California, U.S.
- Education: California College of Arts and Crafts, San Francisco Art Institute
- Known for: New Deal-era murals, sculpture, lithographs, pencil sketches
- Notable work: Coit Tower mural Newsgathering, United States Post Office (Berkeley, California) mural Incidents in California History
- Movement: Social realism

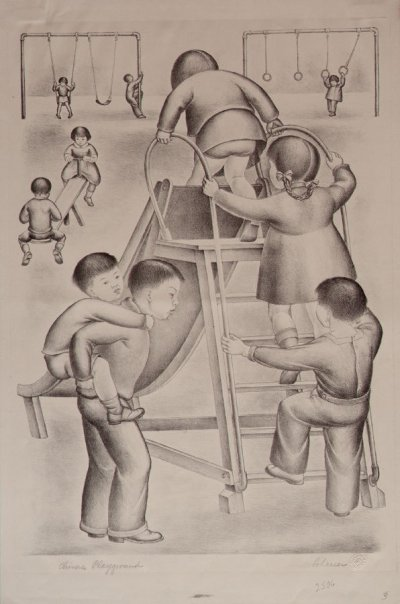
Illustration from a series of pencil sketches Scheuer created at the San Francisco Chinatown Playground

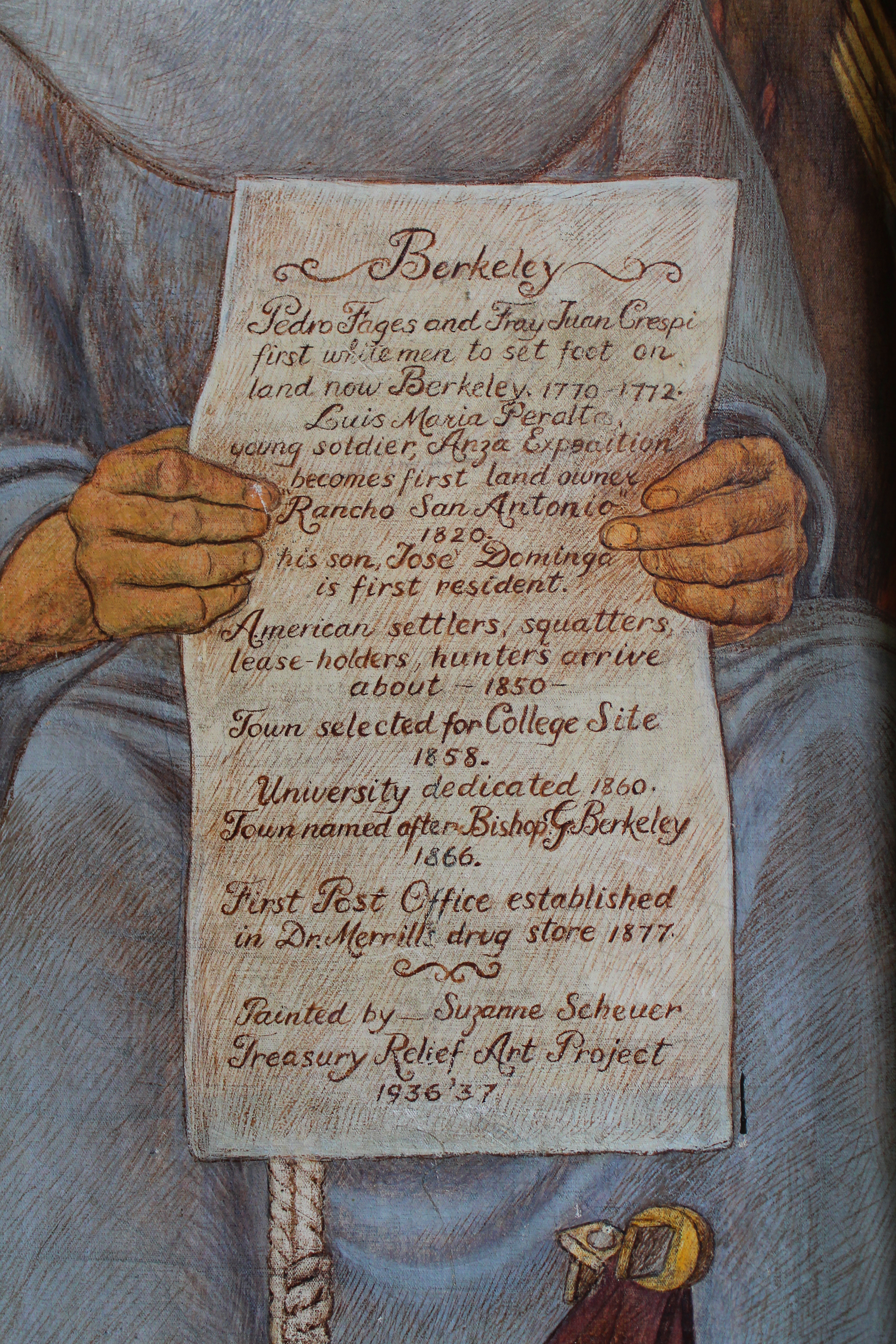
Incidents in California History mural at the United States Post Office, Berkeley (detail)

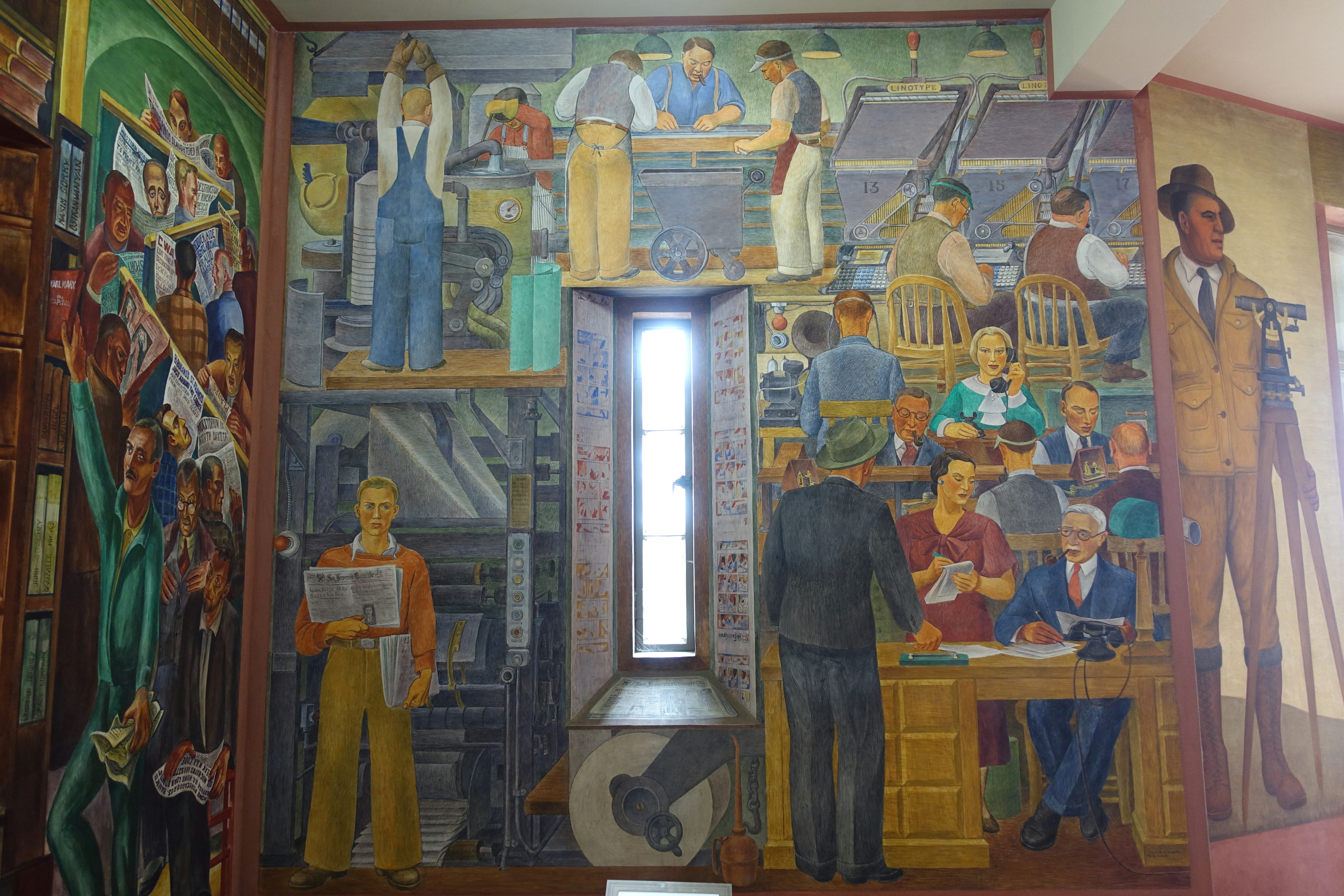
Newsgathering mural in Coit Tower

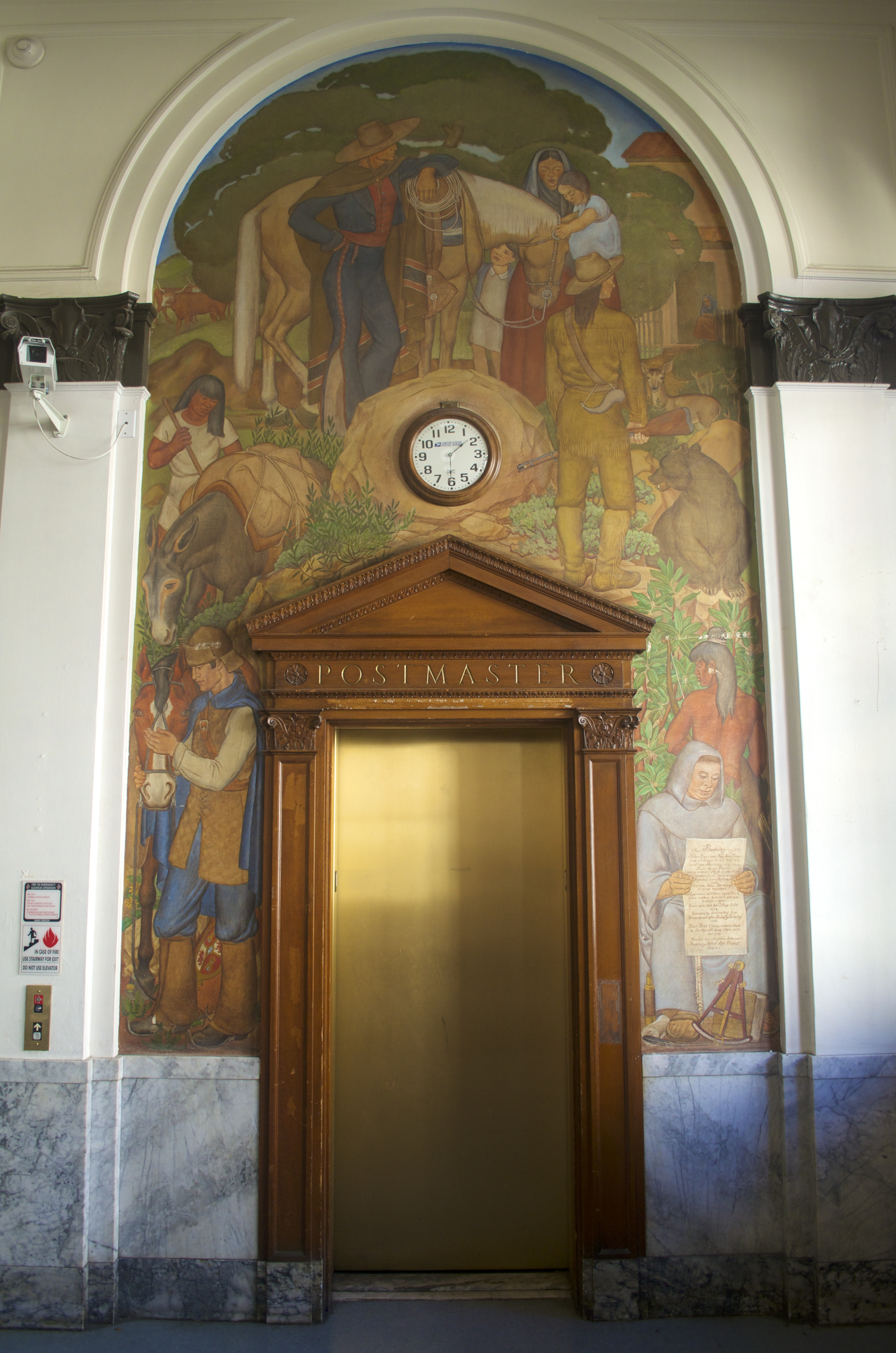
Berkeley Post Office elevator mural

Suzanne Scheuer (1898 – 1984) was an American fine artist, best known for her New Deal-era murals. She painted one of the murals in Coit Tower, Newsgathering.

== Biography ==
Suzanne Scheuer was born in San Jose, California on February 11, 1898. Scheuer was of Dutch descent.

She moved to San Francisco, California in 1918. Scheuer studied at the California College of Arts and Crafts (now California College of the Arts) as a fine arts major, and later went back and got a teacher's credential. Around ten years later she went back to school to study mural painting with Ray Boynton at California School of Fine Arts (now called the San Francisco Art Institute).

Scheuer taught art for three years in Los Banos and Salinas public schools. She then toured Europe extensively, where she gained an appreciation for murals.

== Pencil sketches ==
Scheuer created a number of pencil sketches of children playing at the playground in San Francisco's Chinatown. Many of those sketches are among the collection of the Fine Arts Museums of San Francisco - Legion of Honor Museum.

== Murals ==
In 1933, Scheuer was chosen by Ralph Stackpole to be one of the Coit Tower muralists. Given a choice of California trade and commerce to portray, she selected the theme of "industry", given a family connection to the petroleum industry. She lost out to John Langley Howard for "industry", and accepted the Coit Tower mural theme of "newspapers". The mural was later named Newsgathering. She prepared by sketching the editorial, typesetting, and printing operations at the San Francisco Chronicle. Her assistant on the Coit Tower mural was noted artist Hebe Daum, who would later marry Stackpole's son, Peter.

In 1937, she received a commission from the U.S. Treasury Department's Section of Fine Arts to paint the mural titled Incidents in California History in the Berkeley post office. She also received commissions in 1938 to paint two other post office murals: Indians Moving in Caldwell, Texas and Buffalo Hunt in Eastland, Texas. The Caldwell mural was moved to the Burleson County Courthouse, and mural studies for the Caldwell and Eastland murals are now part of the permanent collection of the Smithsonian American Art Museum.

== Later life ==
In 1940, Scheuer began teaching part-time at the College of the Pacific in Stockton, California while continuing to paint and sculpt. While living there she served as President of the Stockton Art League from 1944-1945. She then moved to Santa Cruz, California, where her extended family had settled. She designed and built six houses there, doing much of the physical and artistic work herself. All six houses were still standing as of 2013. She continued to paint and sculpt.

Scheuer died in Santa Cruz on December 20, 1984.

== See also ==
- Public Works of Art Project (PWAP)
- Works Progress Administration (WPA)
