= Jane Berlandina =

French-American painter

- Born: Jane Clara Howard Berlandina; 15 March 1898; Nice, France
- Died: 1970 (aged 71–72)
- Education: École nationale supérieure des arts décoratifs
- Notable work: Coit Tower murals

Jane Clara Howard Berlandina (March 15, 1898 – 1970) was an American painter. Berlandina's work includes watercolors and murals in San Francisco's Coit Tower.

== Education and relocation to the United States ==
Born in Nice, France, Berlandina's early training was as an abstractionist. She studied at the École nationale supérieure des arts décoratifs under Henri Matisse and Raoul Dufy. While painting in Paris, she was invited to teach at an American school, and she moved to the US in 1928. Shortly after moving, she had her first exhibition in New York and met her future husband, Henry Howard. She moved to San Francisco with him in 1931. She immediately began to exhibit her paintings throughout California, as well as continuing to exhibit in New York and other parts of the US.

== Work ==
Berlandina worked on the Coit Tower murals in 1934. Her mural, "Home Life," was the only Coit Tower mural done in tempera, and was in a significantly different style than the other Coit Tower murals. These murals had been mostly off-limits to the public, but were restored in 2014. Berlandina also painted several murals at the Golden Gate International Exposition.

Berlandina was involved in the Group f/64, lecturing on recent French art trends, and exhibiting her watercolors at Ansel Adams' gallery during the early 1930s. Berlandina later worked as a designer at the San Francisco Opera.

Her watercolors have been described as using "jarring colors in unexpected juxtapositions", including burnt orange against electric blue.
