= Frede Vidar =

Danish-born American visual artist (1911–1967)

- Born: June 6, 1911; Askø, Lolland, Denmark
- Died: January 12, 1967 (aged 55); Ann Arbor, Michigan, U.S.
- Education: California School of Fine Arts, Royal Danish Academy of Fine Arts, École des Beaux-Arts, Academy of Fine Arts, Munich, Académie Julian
- Occupations: Visual artist, illustrator, educator, journalist
- Known for: Painting, murals, illustration, printmaking
- Spouse: Suzanne Austin Sheets
- Children: 5
- Awards: Guggenheim Fellowship (1945)

Frede Vidar (June 6, 1911 – January 12, 1967) was a Danish-born American visual artist, illustrator, and educator. He was known for murals, paintings, and prints, was a war artist during World War II, and he was one of the twenty-six artists who painted murals at Coit Tower in San Francisco.

== Early life and education ==
Frede Vidar was born in Askø in Lolland Municipality, Denmark. He moved to San Francisco as a teenager, and graduated from the High School of Commerce.

Vidar attended the California School of Fine Arts (San Francisco Art Institute), the Royal Danish Academy of Fine Arts, and the Academy of Fine Arts, Munich. Vidar studied under muralist Diego Rivera. He continued his studies at the École des Beaux-Arts, and Académie Julian; and in 1933, he studied under French artists Henri Matisse, and Raoul Dufy. He won the Chaloner Prize Foundation's biennial prize in 1935 to study art for three years in Europe.

== Career ==
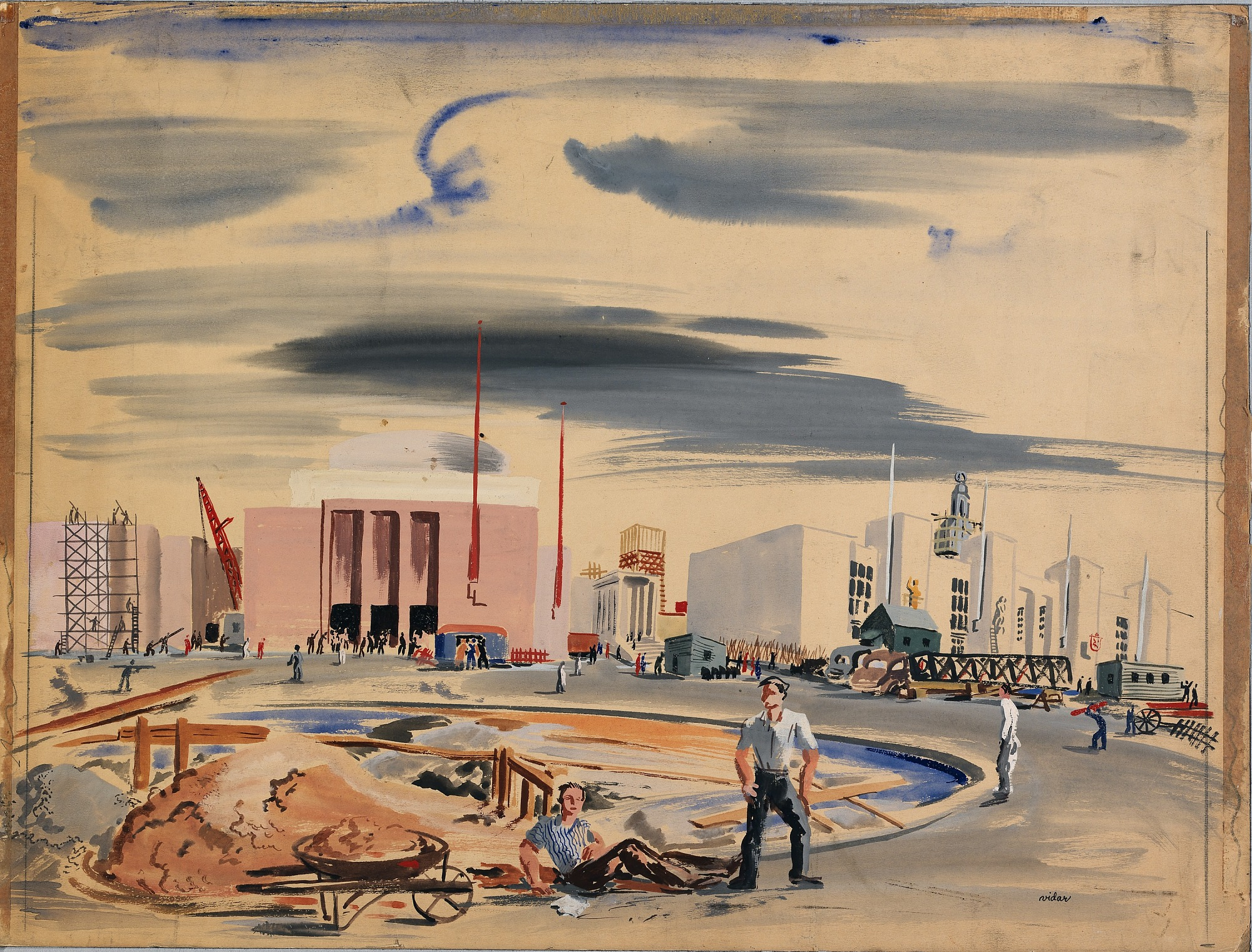
Untitled painting, n.d. by Vidar, watercolor and gouache on paperboard

In 1934, he completed the mural "Department Store" at Coit Tower, commissioned by the Public Works of Art Project. In 1936, Vidar became engaged to Suzanne Austin Sheets from Montclair, New Jersey, the daughter of Harold F. Sheets.

Vidar exhibited in the Golden Gate International Exposition in 1939, on Treasure Island. In 1940, he painted a mural “River Landscape” at the post office in Shelton, Connecticut, a United States Department of the Treasury project through the New Deal Section of Painting and Sculpture.

During World War II, Vidar served in the United States Army as a combat artist starting in 1942, and he left in 1946 with the rank of major. In 1945 during his enlistment, he was awarded a Guggenheim Fellowship. After the war, he relocated to New Jersey.

He taught at Washington University in St. Louis, the University of Wisconsin, the New York School of Interior Decoration (now New York School of Interior Design), the Newark School of Fine and Industrial Art, and starting in the 1950s at the University of Michigan.

Vidar died on January 12, 1967, in Ann Arbor. His work can be found in museum collections, including at the Smithsonian American Art Museum, Stedelijk Museum Amsterdam, and the Whitney Museum of American Art.

== See also ==
- List of Federal Art Project artists
- List of United States post office murals
