= Ben Cunningham (artist) =

American artist and teacher (1904–1975)

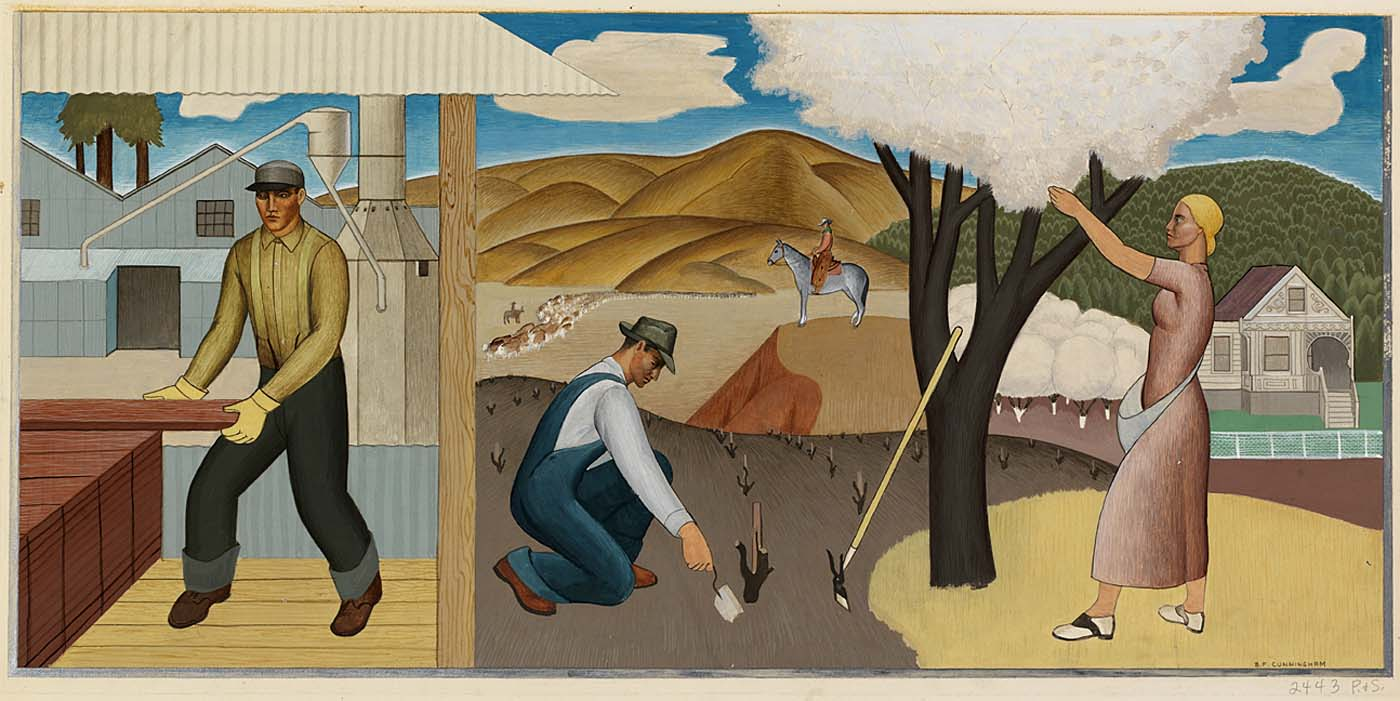
Resources of the Soil, study for a 1938 WPA mural by Ben Cunningham at the Ukiah, California, Post Office.

Ben Frazier Cunningham (February 10, 1904–April 5, 1975) was an American artist and teacher. In his early career he was a painter of murals at sites including Coit Tower in San Francisco. In his later career he explored color and perception in works sometimes labeled op art. His works are in the collections of major institutions including MOMA, the National Gallery of Art, and the Smithsonian.

== Early life and education ==
Cunningham was born in Cripple Creek, Colorado, in 1904. His family moved to Reno, Nevada in 1907, where Cunningham graduated from Reno High School and briefly attended the University of Nevada, Reno during the fall of 1922. In 1925 he moved to San Francisco, where he studied intermittently at the Mark Hopkins Art Institute (now the San Francisco Art Institute) until 1929. Along with painting, he studied weaving and tapestry design. He then briefly returned to Reno to work for a mining company before moving back to the Bay Area in 1930.

== Career ==
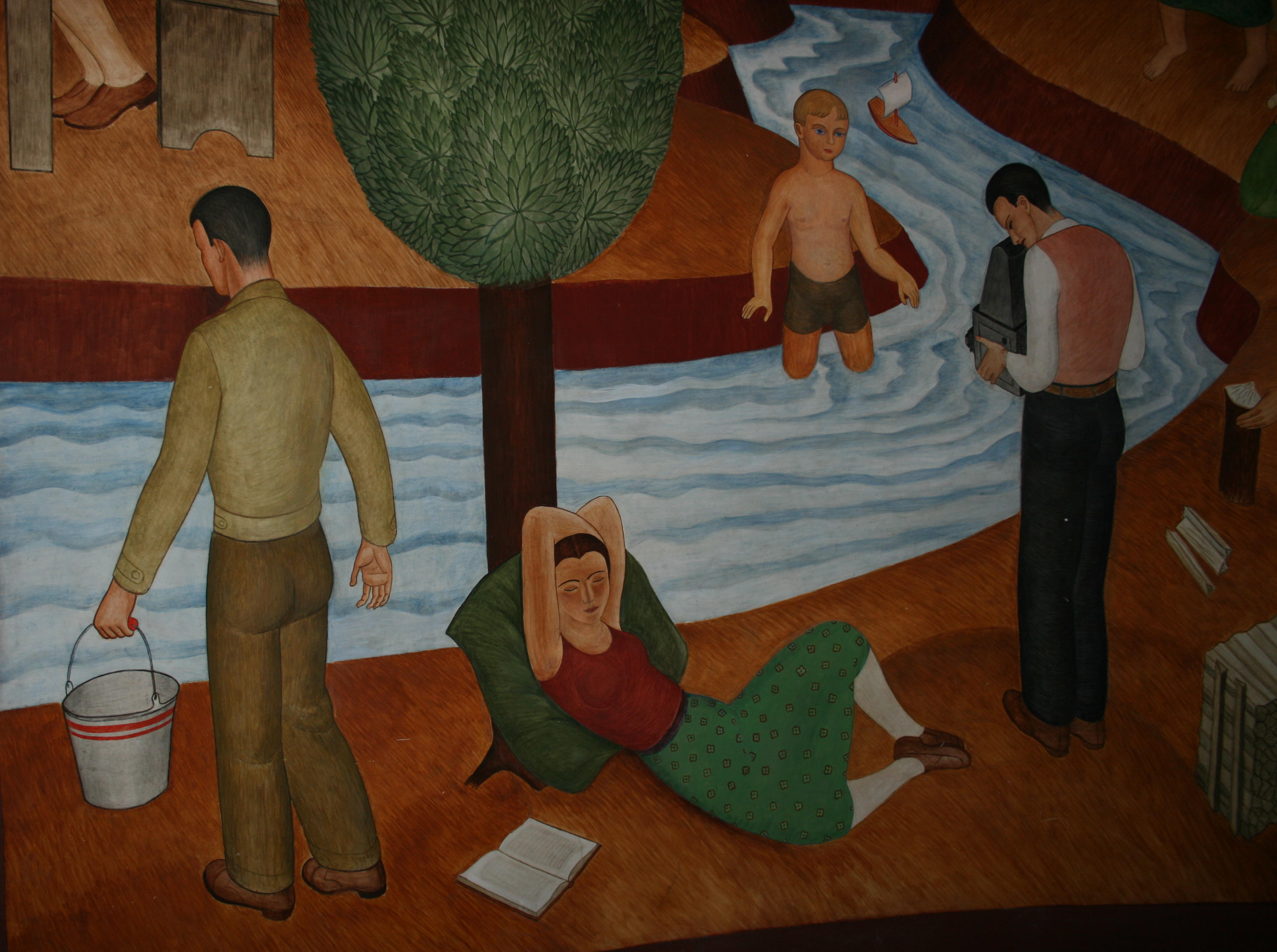
Detail of Cunningham's Outdoor Life mural in Coit Tower.

Cunningham participated in his first professional group show at the Beaux Arts Gallery in San Francisco in 1930, and began to gain recognition from his peers. He found his first actual employment as an artist working at Coit Tower in San Francisco in 1934, where he painted the Outdoor Life mural depicting picnickers, bathers, photographers, and hikers.

He was elected president of the San Francisco chapter of the Artists Congress in 1936. That same year, he was appointed supervisor of mural painting for Northern California under the Works Progress Administration Federal Art Project.

In 1931 he married artist Marion Osborn Cunningham. They divorced in 1937.

in 1939 Cunningham met Hilaire Hiler, who was to become a major influence on his thought and work. Hiler sought a bridge between science and art, to create work without intentional political or ideological content in which color is used to transmit forms and sensations in space with the aim to create extra-optical perceptions. Hiler introduced Cunningham to Wilhelm Ostwald's color theory, which became a touchstone for Cunningham as he explored the relationship between pigments and color perception.

During World War II, Cunningham was trained as a naval architect, working on blueprints for destroyers and cruisers.

Cunningham's two-panel Scarlet Tesseract (1970) installed at a 90-degree angle in a corner.

Cunningham moved to New York in 1944 and continued his increasingly complex work in hard-edge geometric, emotionally low-key compositions. He worked his way through existing modernist precepts before arriving at his mature style, of which Corner Painting (1948-50) is emblematic. Veils of geometric shapes on two canvases, placed in a corner, create the illusion that space extends beyond the walls. This effect was achieved again in a larger work, Six Dimensions of Orange (1965), and in the two-panel silkscreen on poystyrol Scarlet Tesseract, produced in a limited edition by Domberger in Germany in 1970.

In conceptual geometry, a tesseract is produced by inserting one three-dimensional cube into another, creating a shape that can be perceived only when in motion. Here [in Scarlet Tesseract] Cunningham gave visual form to this theoretical shape by screenprinting two-dimensional renderings of intersecting cubes onto two translucent plastic panels that are to be installed in a corner at a ninety-degree angle. As the viewer moves in front of the piece, the form resolves into a tesseract. In works such as this, the artist sought to create images from colors and basic geometric shapes that appear to change as the viewer interacts with them.

In 1968 Cunningham took this concept a step further by painting the three panels of Jewels of the Medici, to be installed on a projecting corner.

In an art scene dominated by abstract expressionism, Cunningham's minutely calculated and delicately calibrated explorations of space and color were out of the mainstream. But this changed in 1964, when

Bruno Palmer-Poroner of the East Hampton Gallery...contacted Cunningham because there were intimations that something called "Optical Art" was about to dominate the New York art scene and he had heard that Cunningham was a practitioner of it. The artist was mystified by the label but pleased when the dealer offered him a one-man exhibition. He was doubly pleased when the curator William Seitz chose his painting Equivocation for inclusion in "The Responsive Eye" exhibition to be held early in 1965 at the Museum of Modern Art...On the basis of this one extraordinarily intricate painting, the artist...was labeled the father, or even more reverentially, the grandfather of Op Art.

MOMA acquired Equivocation for its collection, and Cunningham was invited to exhibit at other major venues, including the Whitney and the Pennsylvania Academy of the Fine Arts. While some saw a similarity between his work and that of Victor Vasarely, Cunningham was unaware of Vasarely's work, and "it was coincidental that he and Vasarely developed interests in similar problems in painting at the same time. Their paths crossed during this particular period but took quite different directions before and after this short interlude."

Cunningham taught art classes at Newark School of Fine Arts, Cooper Union, Pratt Institute, and, from 1968 to 1974, at the Art Students League of New York.

Cunningham married Patsy Griffin in 1948. From 1955, they owned and resided at 44 Carmine Street in Greenwich Village. Survived by his wife, he died at a rest home in Hackensack, New Jersey in 1975 at the age of 71

== Color perception and artistic theory ==
Cunningham was said by those who knew him to have a sensitivity to color beyond the norm, with an ability to perceive about 700 colors, far above the ordinary human threshold of 480 colors. According to art historian Cindy Nemser, "Just by looking at a color, Cunningham could identify the hue, relate it to every other hue, and analyze its black and white content. It was the equivalent of having perfect pitch in music."

Observing that 90% of the neurons in the human nervous system are in the eyes, Cunningham said that his goal as a painter was "to organize, to communicate, to delight, to teach new ways of seeing, especially in the realm of color."

Cunningham's 1950 painting Elusion, in which a small, haloed form is cradled within a larger ethereal shape, was taken by some viewers to depict a madonna and child. Cunningham found the interpretation ironic, as the work was never intended to depict human figures. He said, "The painting's meaning is, on a fundamental level, its visual content. There is no reason why a painting cannot have as its subject matter proportion, color, rhythm, or any other plastic elements. The objective of painting is to define a concept, not to illustrate it. The human nervous system is constant and we are continually trying to extend its language."

Cunningham questioned the use of the word "poetic" to describe his work. "To say that a painting is 'poetic' makes as little sense to me as calling an architectural structure 'terpsichorean.' I would suggest that what all art forms do have in common and what gives them an enduring quality is an underlying order and structure—the projected structure and order of the human nervous system itself."

== In Museums ==
Cunningham's works are in the collections of the Museum of Modern Art, the Guggenheim Museum, the Whitney Museum of American Art, the National Gallery of Art, the Smithsonian American Art Museum, the Blanton Museum in Austin, the Princeton University Art Museum, the Lilley Museum of Art at the University of Nevada, Reno, the Modern Art Museum of Fort Worth, the Tweed Museum of Art at the University of Minnesota Duluth, Morgan State University, Baltimore, Memphis Brooks Museum of Art, The Neuberger Museum of Art at Purchase College, and the Birla Academy of Art and Culture in Kolkata, India.

Cunningham's papers are preserved at the Smithsonian's Archives of American Art and at Syracuse University.

== Bibliography ==
- Evans, Ingrid. "Ben Cunningham (1904-1975)" in Nevada Historical Society Quarterly, volume 33, number 2, Summer 1990.
- Nemser, Cindy. Ben Cunningham: A Life with Color, Post, Texas: JPL Art Publishers, 1989.
- Zakheim, Masha and Beatty, Don. Coit Tower, San Francisco: Its History and Art, San Francisco: Volcano Press, 1983.
