= Coit Tower =

- Coit Memorial Tower
- U.S. National Register of Historic Places
- San Francisco Designated Landmark
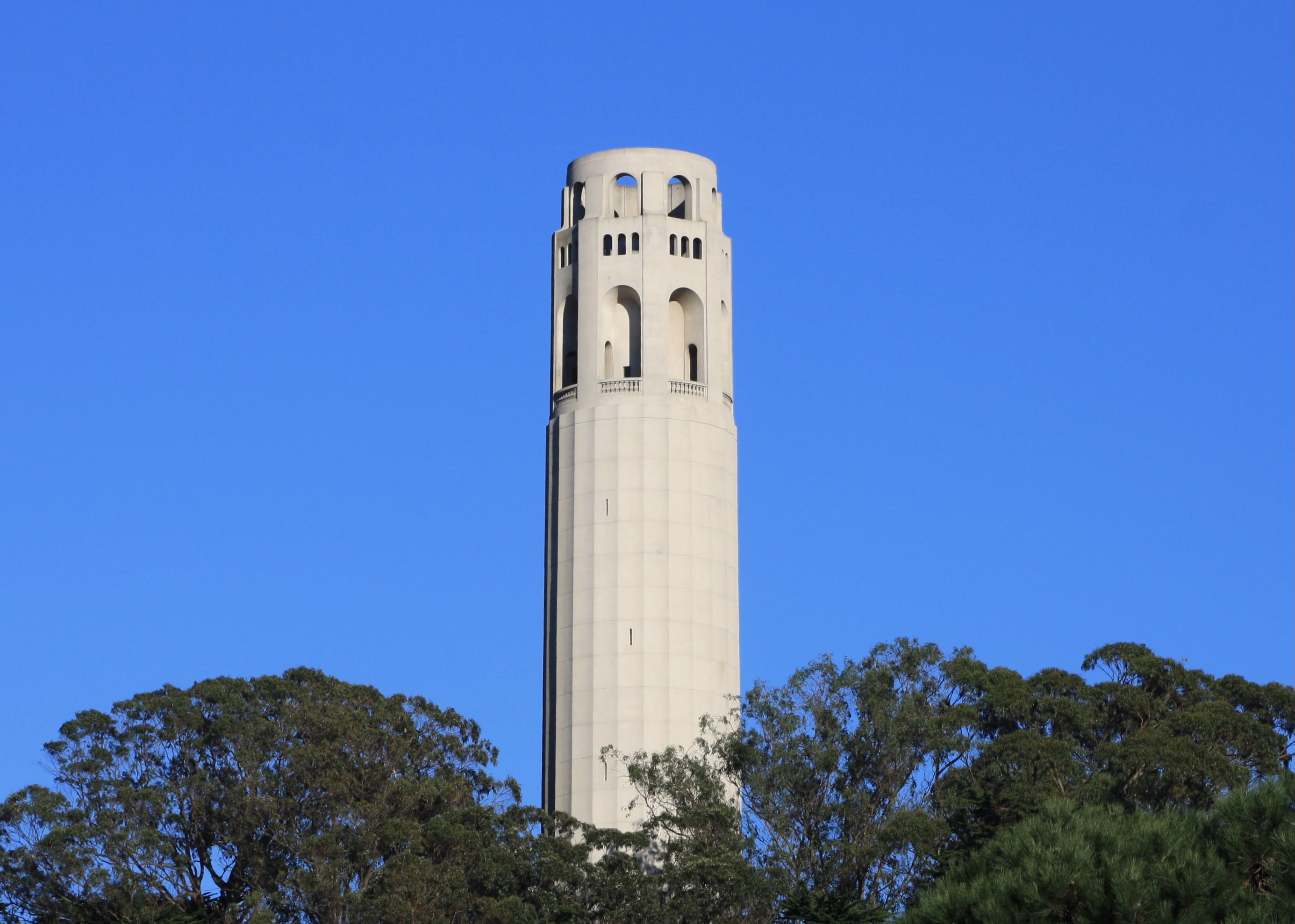
- View from Washington Square Park in 2024

- Location within San Francisco County Location within California Location within the United States
- Location: 1 Telegraph Hill Blvd. San Francisco, California
- Coordinates: 37°48′09″N 122°24′21″W
- Area: 1.7 acres (0.69 ha)
- Built: 1933
- Architects: Arthur Brown Jr., Henry Temple Howard
- Architectural style: Art Deco
- NRHP reference No.: 07001468
- SFDL No.: 165

Significant dates
- Added to NRHP: January 29, 2008
- Designated SFDL: 1984

Coit Tower (/ˈkɔɪt/ KOYT; also known as Coit Memorial Tower) is a 210-foot (64 m) tower in the Telegraph Hill neighborhood of San Francisco, California, overlooking the city and San Francisco Bay. The tower, in the city's Pioneer Park, was built between 1932 and 1933 using Lillie Hitchcock Coit's bequest to beautify the city of San Francisco. It was added to the National Register of Historic Places on January 29, 2008.

The Art Deco tower, built of unpainted reinforced concrete, was designed by architects Arthur Brown Jr. and Henry Temple Howard. The interior features fresco murals in the American Social Realism style, painted by 22 different onsite artists and their numerous assistants. Three artists preferred oil on canvas and worked offsite. One artist preferred egg tempera rather than fresco.

It is often erroneously stated that the structure was dedicated to the volunteer firemen who had died in San Francisco's five major fires, but that is not accurate. The tower was constructed as the result of a bequest by Lillie Hitchcock Coit, whose will included two bequests, one to create a memorial to the city's volunteer firefighters, which was done by statuary in Washington Square, and the other to beautify the city. Coit Tower is the result of the second bequest. A concrete relief of a phoenix by sculptor Robert Boardman Howard is placed above the main entrance. It was commissioned by the architect and cast as part of the building.

Although an apocryphal story claims that the tower was designed to resemble a fire hose nozzle due to Coit's affinity with the San Francisco firefighters of the day, the resemblance is coincidental.

== History ==
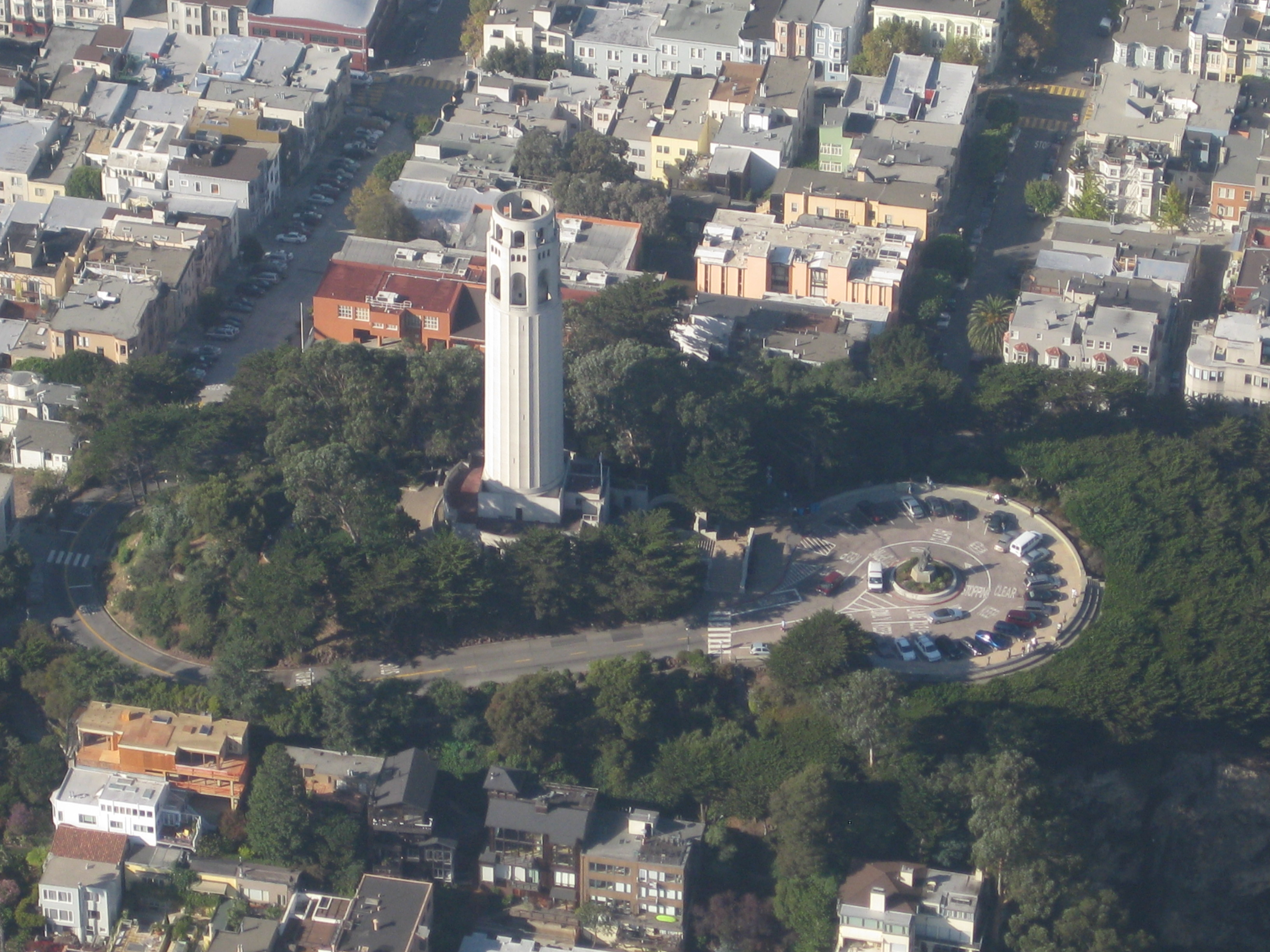
Coit Tower in 2008, looking WSW

Telegraph Hill, the tower's location, has been described as "the most optimal 360 degree viewing point to the San Francisco Bay and five surrounding counties." In 1849, it became the site of a two-story observation deck, from which information about incoming ships was broadcast to city residents using an optical semaphore system, replaced in 1853 by an electrical telegraph that was destroyed by a storm in 1870.

Coit Tower was paid for with money left by Lillie Hitchcock Coit (1843–1929), a wealthy socialite who loved to chase fires in the early days of the city's history. Before December 1866, there was no city fire department, and fires in the city, which broke out regularly in the wooden buildings, were extinguished by several volunteer fire companies. Coit was one of the more eccentric characters in the history of North Beach and Telegraph Hill, smoking cigars and wearing trousers long before it was socially acceptable for women to do so. She was an avid gambler and often dressed like a man in order to gamble in the males-only establishments that dotted North Beach.

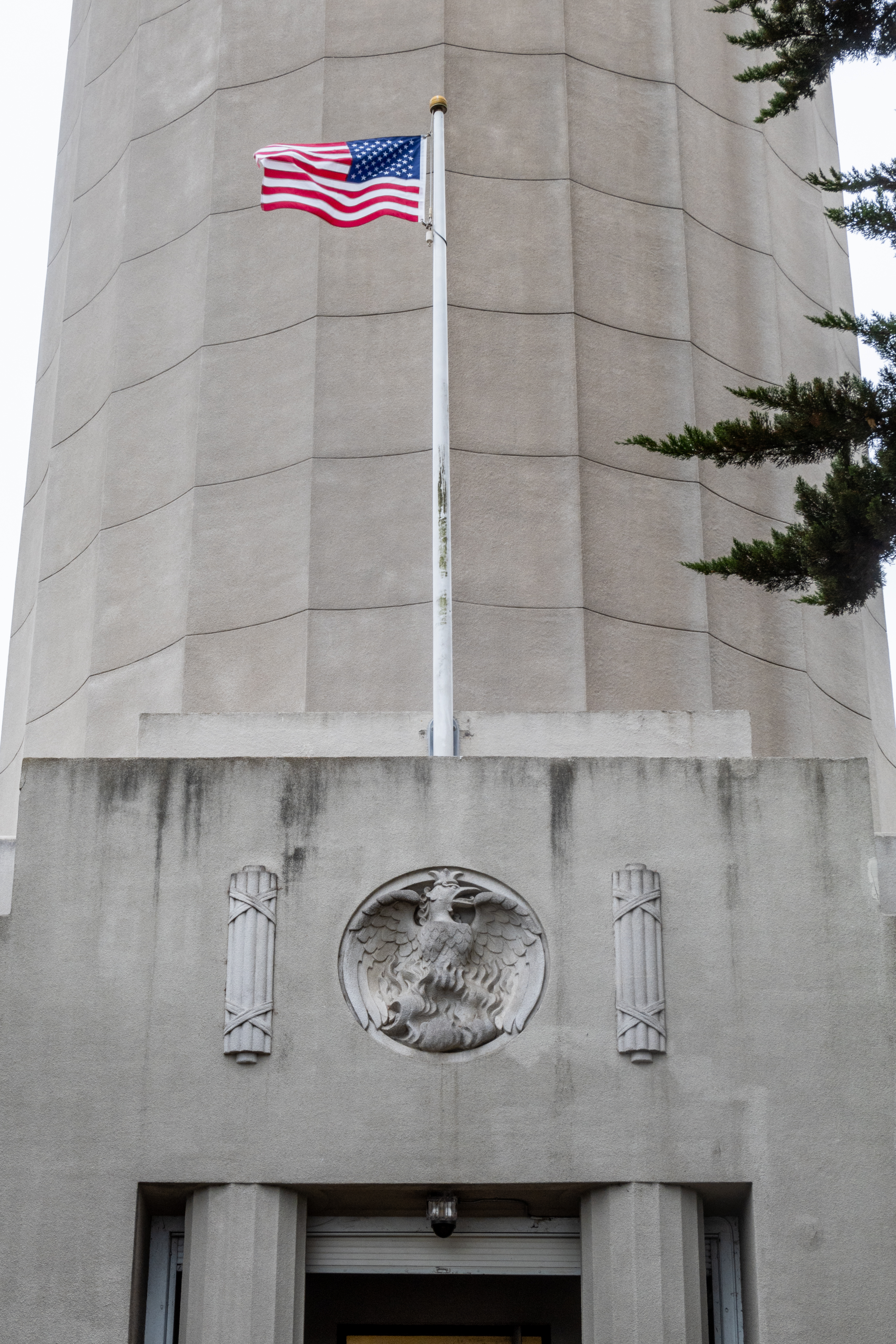
Robert Boardman Howard's cast concrete relief of a phoenix is placed above the main entrance to the tower.

Coit's fortune funded the monument four years following her death in 1929. She had a special relationship with the city's firefighters. At age 15, in 1858, she reportedly witnessed the Knickerbocker Engine Co. No. 5 responding to a fire call on Telegraph Hill when they were shorthanded and helped them get up the hill ahead of other competing engine companies; calling out to other bystanders to help. Her efforts resulted in the Knickerbocker Engine Co. No. 5 being the first engine on site fighting the fire. Sources differ on whether this happened while she was coming home from school or coming from a rehearsal for a wedding. After that Coit became the Engine Co. mascot and could barely be constrained by her parents from jumping into action at the sound of every fire bell. She frequently rode with the Knickerbocker Engine Co. 5, especially in street parades and celebrations in which the Engine Co. participated. Through her youth and adulthood Coit was recognized as an honorary firefighter.

In her will she specified that one third of her fortune, amounting to $118,000, "be expended in an appropriate manner for the purpose of adding to the beauty of the city which I have always loved." Two memorials were built in her name. One was Coit Tower, and the other was a sculpture depicting three firemen, one of them carrying a woman in his arms.

The San Francisco County Board of Supervisors proposed that Coit's bequest be used for a road at Lake Merced. This proposal brought disapproval from the estate's executors, who expressed a desire that the county find "ways and means of expending this money on a memorial that in itself would be an entity and not a unit of public development". Art Commission president Herbert Fleishhacker suggested a memorial on Telegraph Hill, which was approved by the estate executors. An additional $7,000 in city funds was appropriated, and a design competition was initiated. The winner was architect Arthur Brown, Jr, whose design was completed and dedicated on October 8, 1933.

The following month Honore Bowlby-Gledhill, proprietor of the Dead Fish Cafe (an 'artists' restaurant') in Telegraph Hill, was charged (under the name 'Helen Smith') with shooting a pistol at the tower. Bowlby-Gledhill was quoted as objecting to the tower because it 'looked like a silo'.

Coit Tower was listed as a San Francisco Designated Landmark in 1984 and on the National Register of Historic Places in 2008. Although Coit Tower itself is not technically a California Historical Landmark, the state historical plaque for Telegraph Hill is located in the tower's lobby, marking the site of the original signal station.

In 2012, residents of the city voted in favor of Proposition B, the Coit Tower Protection Initiative, that requires the city to pay for the preservation of the murals and the building. The San Francisco Arts Commission ordered the removal of the Statue of Christopher Columbus that had stood outside the entrance of the tower since 1957, following numerous other removals of controversial statues during the George Floyd protests that began in May 2020, and it was removed on June 18, 2020.

== Architecture ==
Brown's competition design envisioned a restaurant in the tower, which was changed to an exhibition area in the final version. The design uses three nesting concrete cylinders, the outermost a tapering fluted 180-foot (55 m) shaft that supports the viewing platform. An intermediate shaft contains a stairway, and an inner shaft houses the elevator. The observation deck is 32 feet (9.8 m) below the top, with an arcade and skylights above it. A rotunda at the base houses display space and a gift shop.

According to the San Francisco Chronicle (1985), "The tower has been leaking since the day it was dedicated." The building was never designed to house artwork. Potable water is pumped from a water main at street level to two 1,000 US gal (3,800 L) tanks on the fifth floor, and gravity is used to feed all systems in the tower; a booster pump was installed later at the tanks to provide adequate pressure for the restrooms. Because of this arrangement, the murals (on the second and ground floors) are vulnerable to water damage from system leaks, which could be avoided if adequate pressure was available from the water supply at the street.

== Mural project ==
Coit Tower rotunda layout and murals
No.		Thumbnail	Name	Artist	Size (H×W)	Notes	Refs.
Rotunda murals
1	a		Animal Force	Ray Boynton	10 ft × 36 ft 3.0 m × 11.0 m (aggregate)	First mural visible as visitors enter the rotunda; left and right panels are separated by "Old Man Weather" over the entrance to the elevator lobby. Animal Force has an alcove with a bronze plaque and commemorative dates; this panel depicts the use of animals in agriculture. Machine Force shows construction, transportation, and power production machines.	
1	b		Machine Force	Ray Boynton	10 ft × 36 ft 3.0 m × 11.0 m (aggregate)	First mural visible as visitors enter the rotunda; left and right panels are separated by "Old Man Weather" over the entrance to the elevator lobby. Animal Force has an alcove with a bronze plaque and commemorative dates; this panel depicts the use of animals in agriculture. Machine Force shows construction, transportation, and power production machines.	
2			California Industrial Scenes	John Langley Howard	10 ft × 24 ft 3.0 m × 7.3 m	Industrial scenes, including construction, oil recovery, and mining; ironic points include use of hand tools and a broken-down car.	
3			Railroad and Shipping	William Hesthal	10 ft × 10 ft 3.0 m × 3.0 m	Train and ship, used to transport goods; a narrow window interrupts the center of the panel.	
4	a		Steelworker	Clifford Wight	10 ft × 4 ft 3.0 m × 1.2 m (each)	Straddles windows on the west wall; originally linked by a bridge with controversial symbols depicting capitalism and communism, but these elements were removed before 1934.	
4	b		Surveyor	Clifford Wight	10 ft × 4 ft 3.0 m × 1.2 m (each)	Straddles windows on the west wall; originally linked by a bridge with controversial symbols depicting capitalism and communism, but these elements were removed before 1934.	
5			Industries of California	Ralph Stackpole	10 ft × 36 ft 3.0 m × 11.0 m	Industrial scenes, including food production and a chemical laboratory. Depicts several artists, including Tom Lehman (pouring chemicals), William Hesthal (bending over table in checked shirt), and Helen Clement Mills (part of packing crew).	
6			Newsgathering	Suzanne Scheuer and Hebe Daum	10 ft × 10 ft 3.0 m × 3.0 m	Newspaper offices; the window ledge has a replica of the front page of the San Francisco Chronicle, celebrating the completion of the murals.	
7			Library	Bernard Zakheim	10 ft × 10 ft 3.0 m × 3.0 m	Public library; individual portraits depict numerous artists, family, and friends alongside current news topics.	
8	a		Scientist-Inventor	Harold Mallette Dean	10 ft × 4 ft 3.0 m × 1.2 m (each)	Straddles windows on the south wall; stockbroker may depict Amadeo Giannini, while scientist stands in front of Lick Observatory.	
8	b		Stockbroker	Harold Mallette Dean	10 ft × 4 ft 3.0 m × 1.2 m (each)	Straddles windows on the south wall; stockbroker may depict Amadeo Giannini, while scientist stands in front of Lick Observatory.	
9			City Life	Victor Arnautoff	10 ft × 36 ft 3.0 m × 11.0 m	Depicts busy street scenes in the Financial District of San Francisco, based on the corner of Montgomery and Washington.	
10			Banking and Law	George Albert Harris	10 ft × 10 ft 3.0 m × 3.0 m	Depicts Federal Reserve Bank, Stock Exchange, and a law library.	
11			Department Store	Frede Vidar	10 ft × 10 ft 3.0 m × 3.0 m	Contemporary department store interior, including soda fountain.	
12	a		Cowboy	Clifford Wight	10 ft × 4 ft 3.0 m × 1.2 m (each)	Straddles windows on the east wall; farmer may depict Ralph Stackpole while cowboy may depict Wight.	
12	b		Farmer	Clifford Wight	10 ft × 4 ft 3.0 m × 1.2 m (each)	Straddles windows on the east wall; farmer may depict Ralph Stackpole while cowboy may depict Wight.	
13			California	Maxine Albro	10 ft × 36 ft 3.0 m × 11.0 m	Depicts agricultural scenes from California; most portraits are friends of Albro, including her future husband (Parker Hall, next to apricot trays) and Ralph Stackpole (checkered shirt).	
14			Meat Industry	Ray Bertrand	10 ft × 10 ft 3.0 m × 3.0 m	Slaughterhouse and meat packing operations.	
15			California Agricultural Industry	Gordon Langdon and Helen Clement Mills	10 ft × 27 ft 3.0 m × 8.2 m	Dairy and timber industries.	
20			Power	Frederick Olmsted Jr.	3 ft × 3 ft 0.91 m × 0.91 m	Transition piece flanked by industrial scenes, over rotunda entrance	
Elevator lobby murals
16			San Francisco Bay	Otis Oldfield	9 ft × 4 1/2 ft 2.7 m × 1.4 m	Oil on canvas, depicts view from Telegraph Hill towards Berkeley.	
17			San Francisco Bay, North	Jose Moya del Pino	9 ft × 4 1/2 ft 2.7 m × 1.4 m	Oil on canvas, depicts view from Telegraph Hill towards Marin County, including Alcatraz Island.	
18	a		Bay Area Hills	Rinaldo Cuneo	9 ft × 4 1/2 ft 2.7 m × 1.4 m (each)	Depicts agricultural scenes from the Santa Clara Valley and Berkeley Hills.	
18	b		Bay Area Hills	Rinaldo Cuneo	9 ft × 4 1/2 ft 2.7 m × 1.4 m (each)	Depicts agricultural scenes from the Santa Clara Valley and Berkeley Hills.	
19	a		Bay Area Map	Otis Oldfield	3 ft × 4 1/2 ft 0.91 m × 1.37 m (each)	Installed in lunette spaces over doorways in elevator lobby.	
19	b		Seabirds	Otis Oldfield	3 ft × 4 1/2 ft 0.91 m × 1.37 m (each)	Installed in lunette spaces over doorways in elevator lobby.	
Spiral staircase murals (special access required)
21			Powell Street	Lucien Labaudt	6 ft × 32 ft 1.8 m × 9.8 m (each of two panels)	Largest mural in Coit Tower; most portraits are recognizable.	
Upper level murals
22			Collegiate Sports	Parker Hall	9 ft × 13 ft 2.7 m × 4.0 m	Includes depiction of The Big Game between California and Stanford	
23			Sports	Edward Terada	9 ft × 19 ft 2.7 m × 5.8 m	Leisure sports, including golf and polo	
24			Children at Play	Ralph Chessé	9 ft × 6 ft 2.7 m × 1.8 m	Playground	
25			Hunting in California	Edith Hamlin	9 ft × 12 ft 2.7 m × 3.7 m	Ducks and deer	
26			Outdoor Life	Ben Cunningham	9 ft × 22 ft 2.7 m × 6.7 m	Picnickers, bathers, photographers, hikers	
27			Home Life	Jane Berlandina	9 ft × 34 ft 2.7 m × 10.4 m	In a separate room, shows typical home life activities, including contract bridge, baking, music making, and newspaper reading	

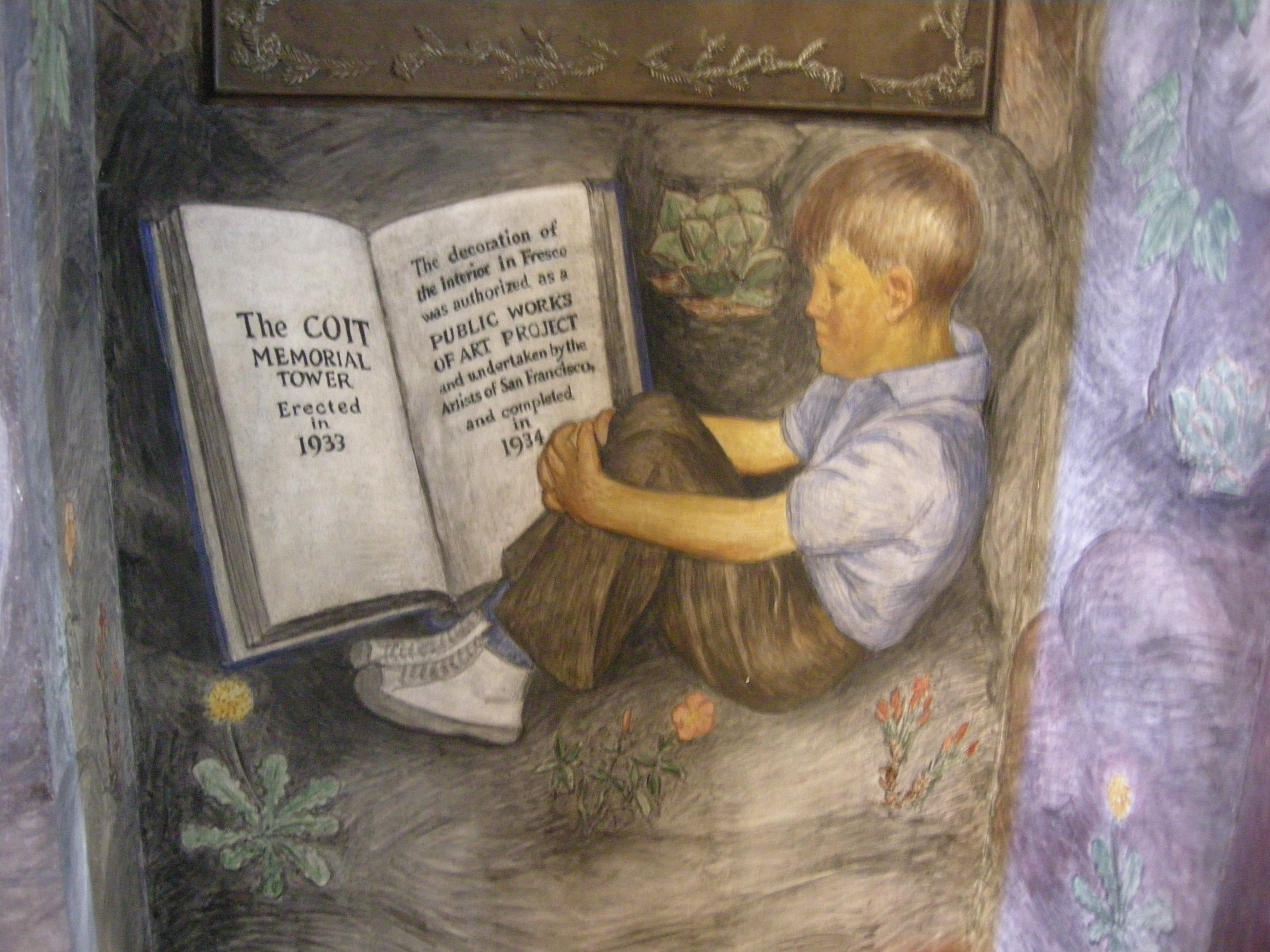
Detail from Ray Boynton's fresco Animal Force and Machine Force, crediting the Public Works of Art Project

The Coit Tower murals in the American Social Realism style formed the pilot project of the Public Works of Art Project, the first of the New Deal federal employment programs for artists. Ralph Stackpole and Bernard Zakheim successfully sought the commission in 1933, and supervised the muralists, including Maxine Albro, Victor Arnautoff, Jane Berlandina, Ray Bertrand, Ray Boynton, Ralph Chessé, Rinaldo Cuneo, Ben Cunningham, Mallette "Harold" Dean, Parker Hall, Edith Hamlin, George Albert Harris, William Hesthal, John Langley Howard, Lucien Labaudt, Gordon Langdon, Jose Moya del Pino Otis Oldfield, Frederick Olmsted Jr., Suzanne Scheuer, Edward Terada, Frede Vidar, and Clifford Wight. Many were faculty and students of the California School of Fine Arts (CSFA).

These artists (chosen by Walter Heil, director of the de Young Museum, together with other officials) were each paid $25 to $45 per week to depict "aspects of life in California." The most well-known of them were assigned sections that were 10 by 36 feet (3.0 by 11.0 m) in size, while less famous artists were confined to 10 by 4 feet (3.0 by 1.2 m).

Selected murals and themes in Coit Tower
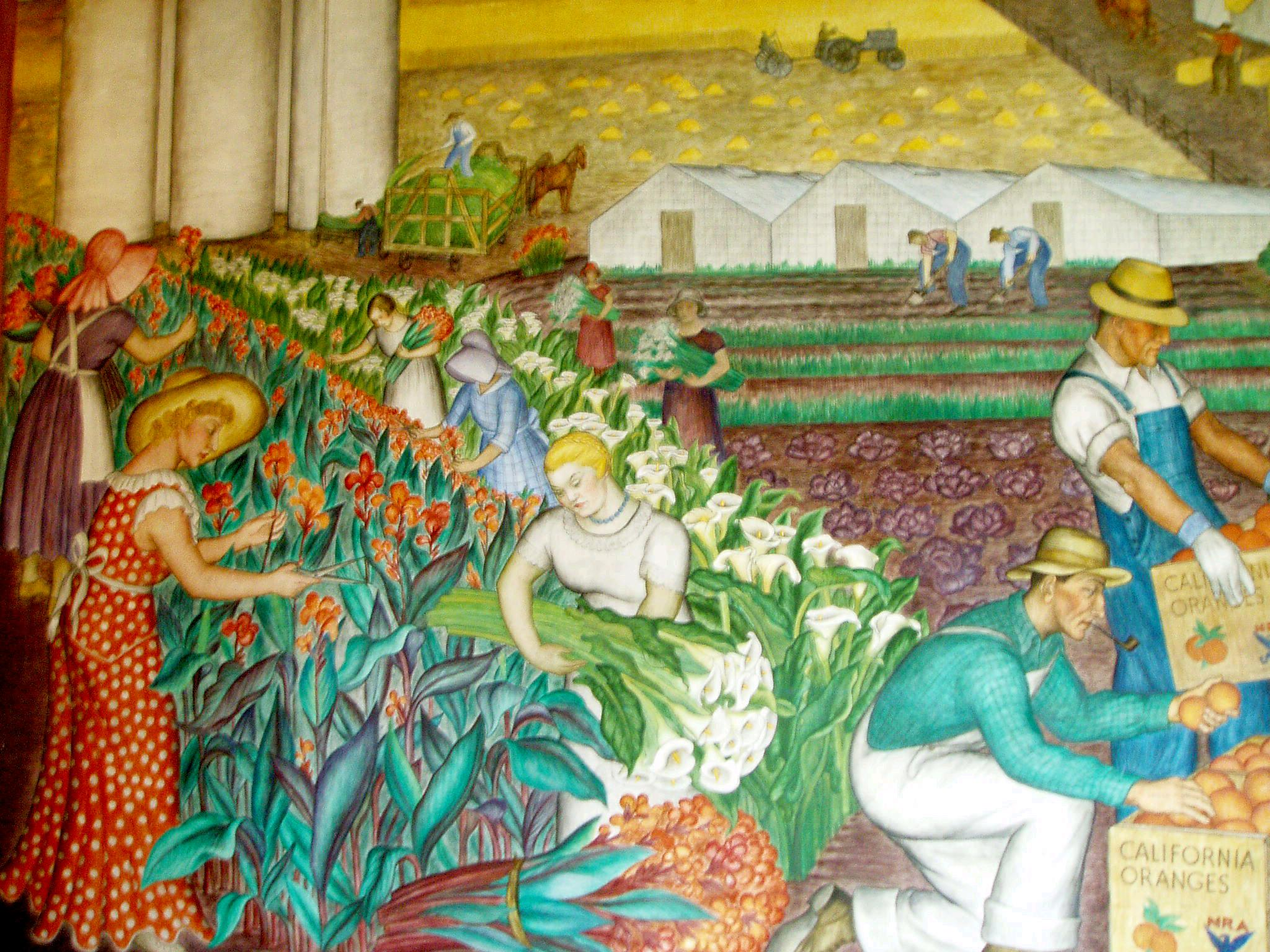
Industry both in the city and out in the fields was an important theme in the murals.
(Maxine Albro, Agriculture in California 13 )

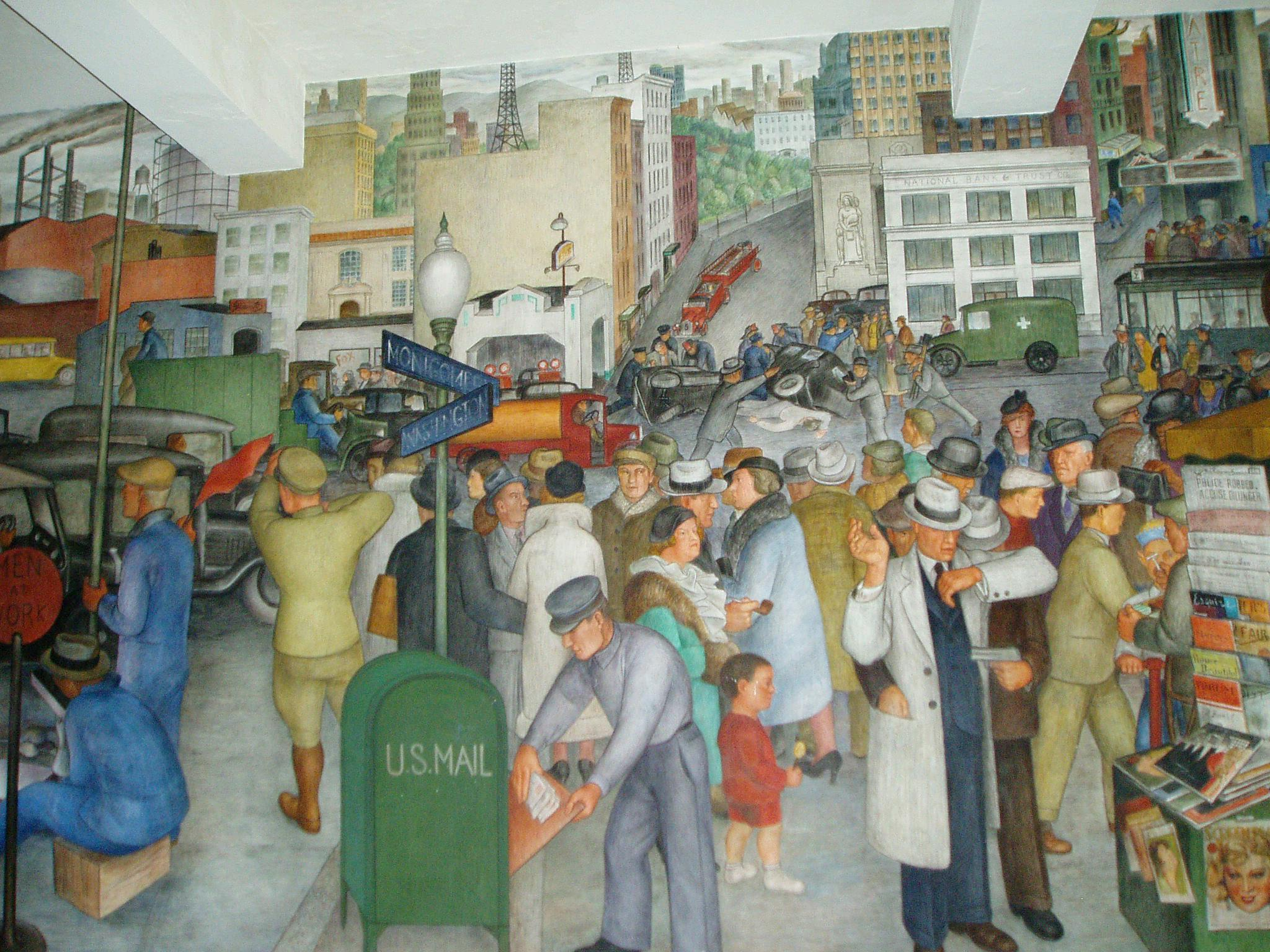
A scene of city life, including a robbery on the bottom right, and a car accident in the center.
(Victor Arnautoff, City Life 9 )

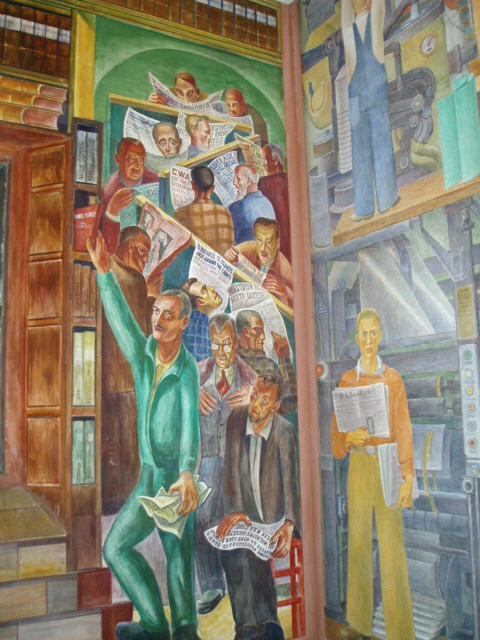
Headlines in the newspapers discuss current events, including the creating of the murals.
(Bernard Zakheim, Library 7 )

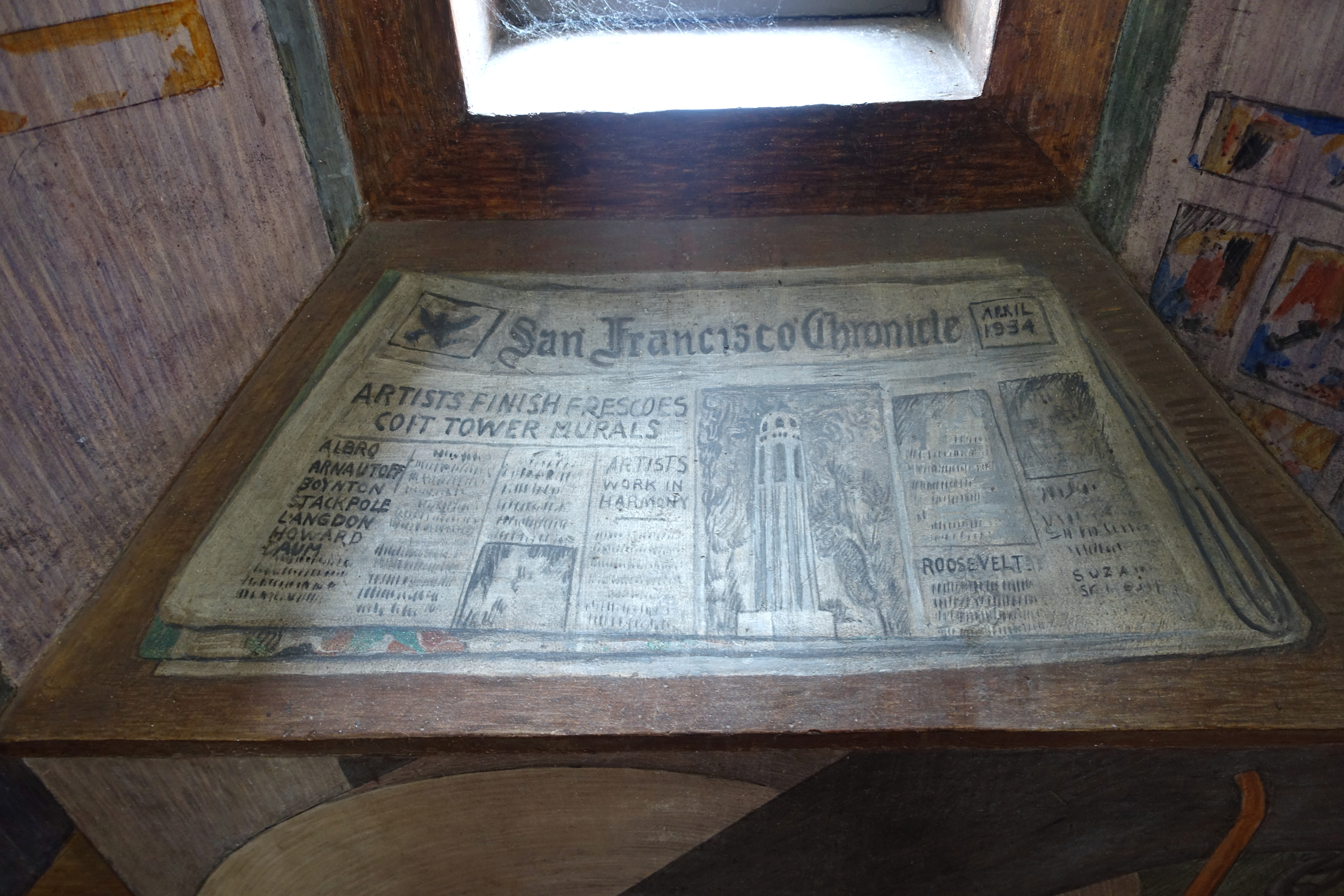
Painted San Francisco Chronicle front page celebrates mural completion, April 1934.
(Suzanne Scheuer, Newsgathering 6 )

=== Themes ===
The artists were committed in varying degrees to racial equality and to leftist and Marxist political ideas, which are strongly expressed in the paintings. Bernard Zakheim's mural Library 7 depicts fellow artist John Langley Howard crumpling a newspaper in his left hand as he reaches for a shelved copy of Karl Marx's Das Kapital (here spelled as Das Capital) with his right. Workers of all races are shown as equals, often in the heroic poses of Socialist realism, while well-dressed racially white members of the capitalist classes enjoy the fruit of their labor.

Victor Arnautoff's City Life 9 includes the periodicals The New Masses and The Daily Worker in the scene's news stand rack.

John Langley Howard's mural California Industrial Scenes 2 depicts an ethnically diverse Labor March as well as showing a destitute family panning for gold while a wealthy, heavily caricatured ensemble observes.

Stackpole's Industries of California 5 was composed along the same lines as an early study of the destroyed Man at the Crossroads.

The youngest of the muralists, George Albert Harris, painted a mural called Banking and Law 10 . In the mural, the world of finance is represented by the Federal Reserve Bank and a stock market ticker (in which stocks are shown as declining) and law is illustrated by a law library. Some of the book titles that appear in the law library, such as Civil, Penal, and Moral Codes, are legitimate, while others list fellow muralists as authors, in a joking or derogatory manner.

After Diego Rivera's Man at the Crossroads mural was destroyed by its Rockefeller Center patrons for the inclusion of an image of Lenin, the Coit Tower muralists protested, picketing the tower. Sympathy for Rivera led some artists to incorporate references to the Rivera incident; in Zakheim's Library panel 7 , Stackpole is painted reading a newspaper headline announcing the destruction of Rivera's mural.

=== Censorship ===
After most of the Coit Tower murals had already been completed, the 1934 West Coast waterfront strike, taking place nearby at the foot of Telegraph Hill, caused government officials, shipping companies, some union leaders and the press to raise fears about communist agitation. This "red scare" has been identified as playing a "crucial role" in a subsequent controversy that mainly focused on two of the murals:

1. 4a and 4b : These portraits were linked originally by a third small fresco in which Clifford Wight portrayed capitalism, the New Deal and communism, the three prominent economic systems of the era, with the communism part containing a hammer and sickle and the caption "Workers of the World Unite."
2. 2 : John Langley Howard's Industry mural (designed with the support of his architect brother Henry Howard), which depicts California industrial scenes including out-of-work men, and angered conservatives by showing a banner of the communist periodical Western Worker above a crowd of workers.

On June 23, 1934, the conservative banker Herbert Fleishhacker, the most powerful member of the committee allocating funds from the Public Works of Art Project, asked Heil to inspect the art, who telegraphed back that some artists had included "details ... and certain symbols which might be interpreted as communistic propaganda," and that "editors of influential papers ... have warned us that they would take hostile attitude towards whole project unless those details be removed." The official opening of the tower, planned for July 7, was canceled and Fleishhacker ordered to close the tower and to block the view from outside through the windows. Subsequently, articles in the San Francisco Chronicle and The San Francisco Examiner attacked the project, sometimes using misleading representations of the artworks in question, while Wight refused to remove the hammer and sickle symbol from his mural. However, federal government officials decided that the offending parts would need to be painted over, and 16 of the artists signed a statement saying that they opposed the hammer and sickle symbol and that it "has no place in the subject matter assigned." Eventually, only the hammer and sickle and the "Western Worker" banner were removed, and Coit Tower opened on October 12, 1934.

=== Technical details and access ===
Two of the murals are of San Francisco Bay scenes. Most murals are done in fresco; the exceptions are one mural done in egg tempera (Home Life by Jane Berlandina, 27 : upstairs, in the last decorated room) and the works done in the elevator foyer, which are oil on canvas ( 16 , 17 , 18 , and 19 ). While most of the murals were restored in 1990 and again in 2014 through cleaning and touching up scratches, the murals in the spiral stairway exit to the observation platform (Powell Street by Lucien Labaudt) were not restored but durably painted over with epoxy surfacing.

Most of the murals are open for public viewing without charge during open hours, although there are ongoing negotiations by the Recreation and Parks Department of San Francisco to begin charging visitors a fee to enter the mural rotunda. The murals in the spiral stairway and second floor, normally closed to the public, are open for viewing through tours. Labaudt's Powell Street runs along both sides of the spiral staircase; the second-floor murals all carry recreational themes.

Since 2004 artist Ben Wood collaborated with other artists on large scale video projections onto the exterior of Coit Tower, in 2004, 2006, 2008 & 2009.

== Residents ==
There is a small unindexed apartment on the second floor of the building. The former army lieutenant William J. Bradley and his wife were paid to live in the apartment to guard the art and the building. It is not known when the couple moved out. During the 1980s, the city renovated the artwork in the building, and once again hired a permanent guardian, Tim Lillyquist, who became the third and last permanent resident of the tower.

== Panorama ==
The tower, which stands atop Telegraph Hill in San Francisco's Pioneer Park, offers panoramic views of San Francisco that take in "crooked" Lombard Street, Nob Hill, Russian Hill, Twin Peaks, Aquatic Park, Pier 39, the Financial District and the Ferry Building, as well as San Francisco Bay itself including Angel Island, Alcatraz, Treasure Island, and the Golden Gate and Bay Bridges.

== Gallery ==
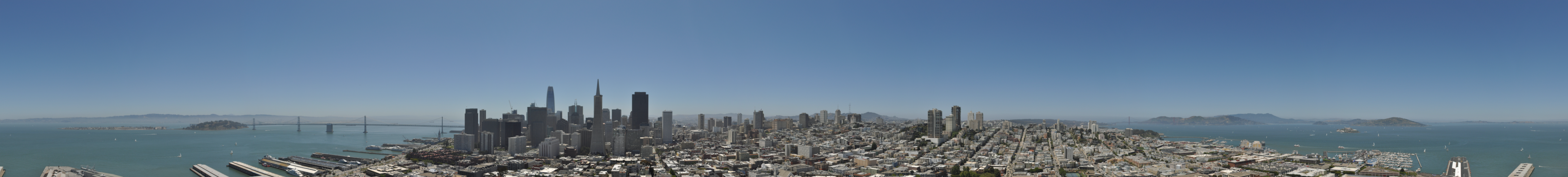
A view of San Francisco from the top of Coit Tower
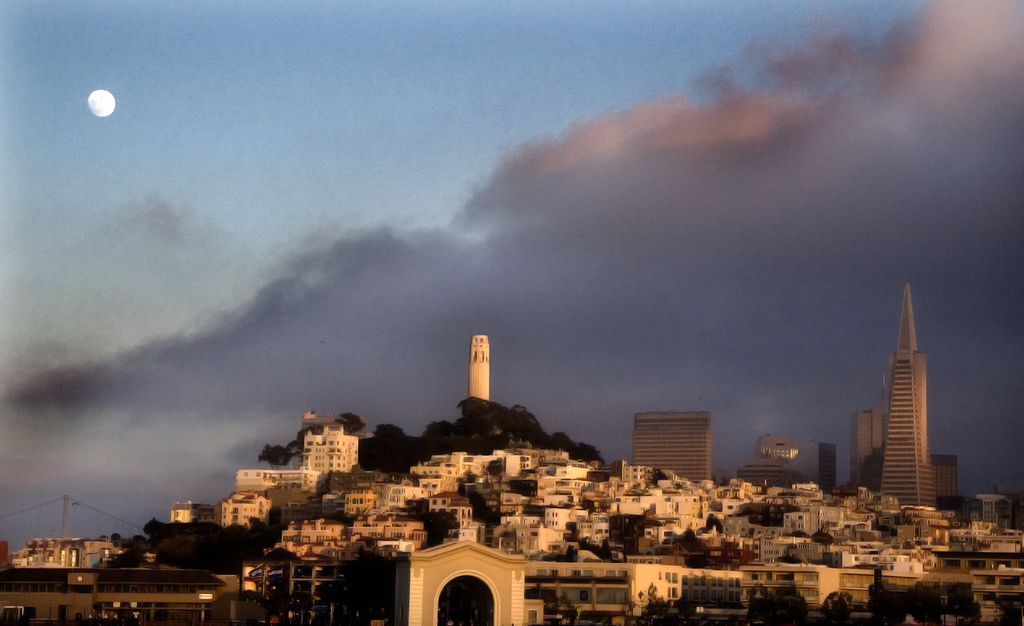
A view of Telegraph Hill from a boat in the San Francisco Bay.

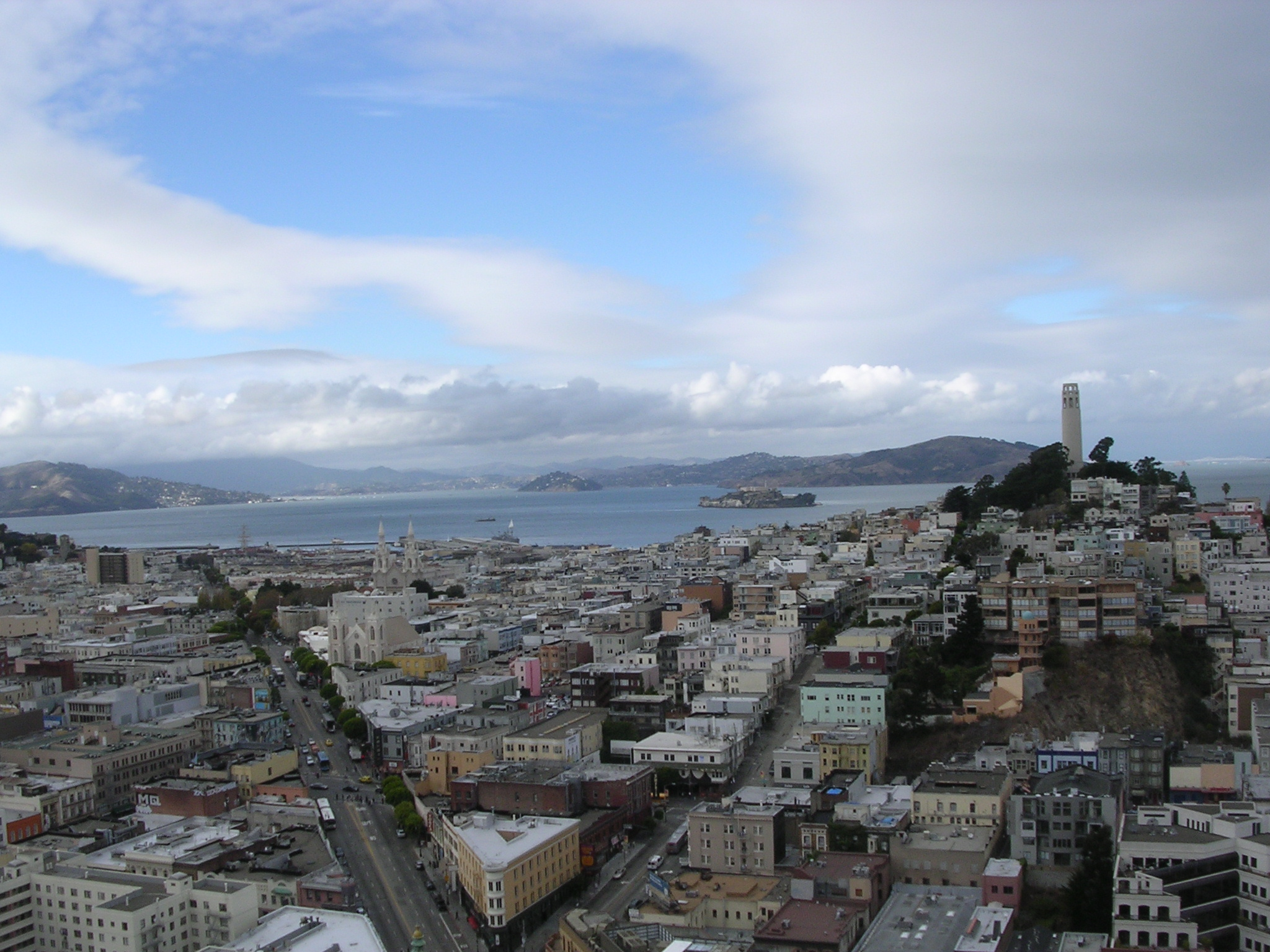
View of Coit Tower, Alcatraz, and Marin County from Downtown.

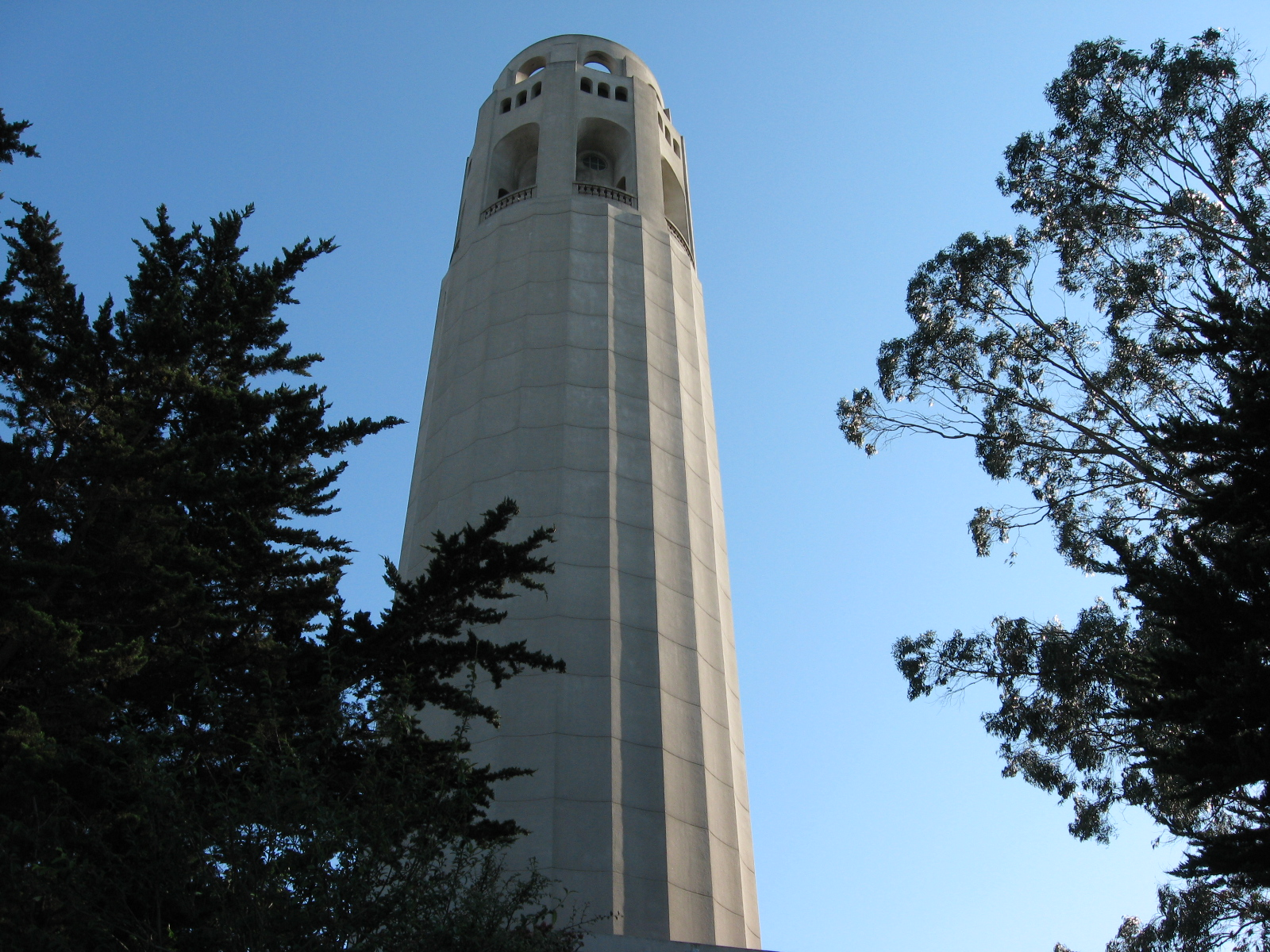
A closer photograph of Coit Tower from the parking lot

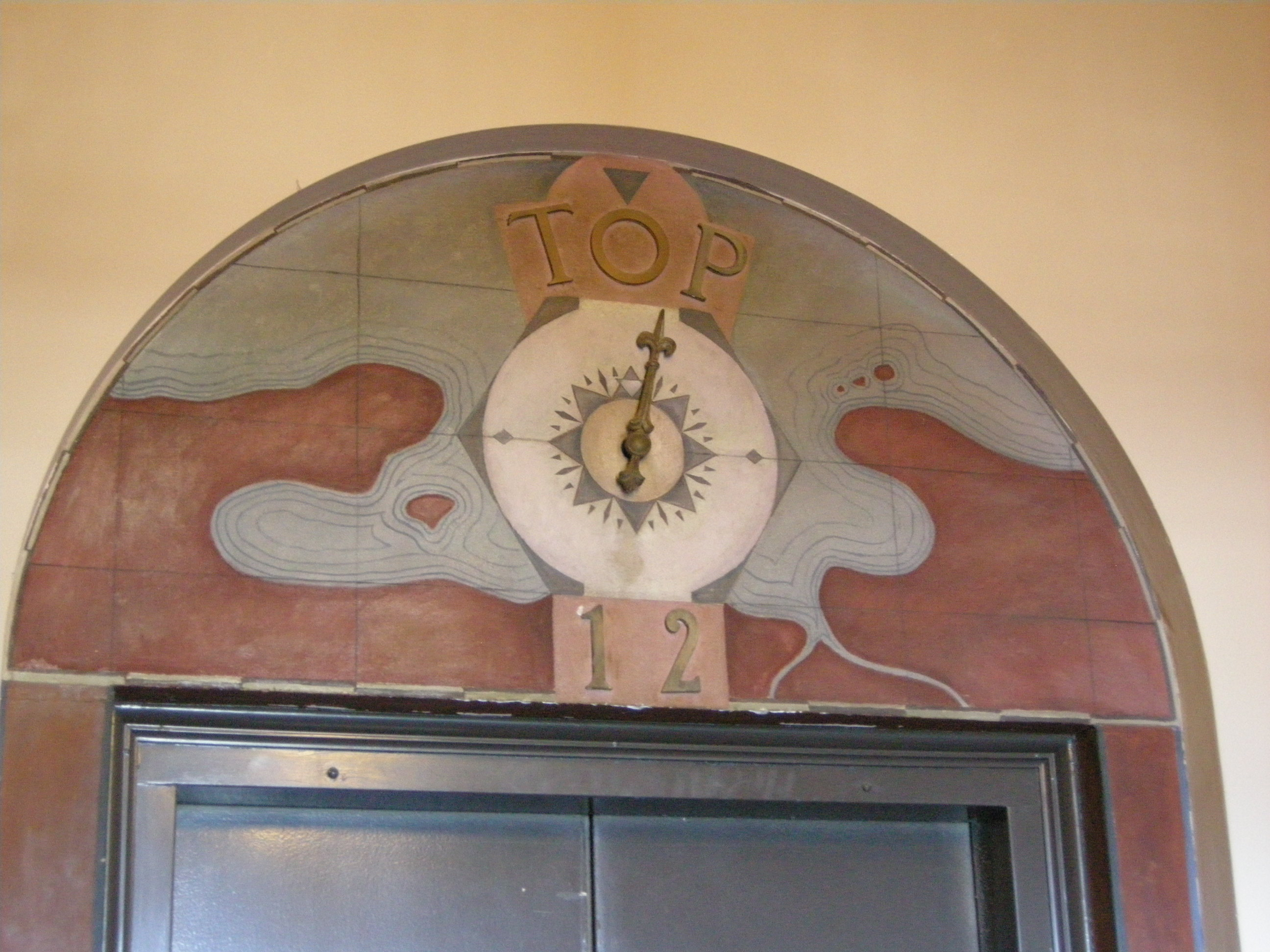
Bay Area Map, mural by Otis Oldfield above the elevator

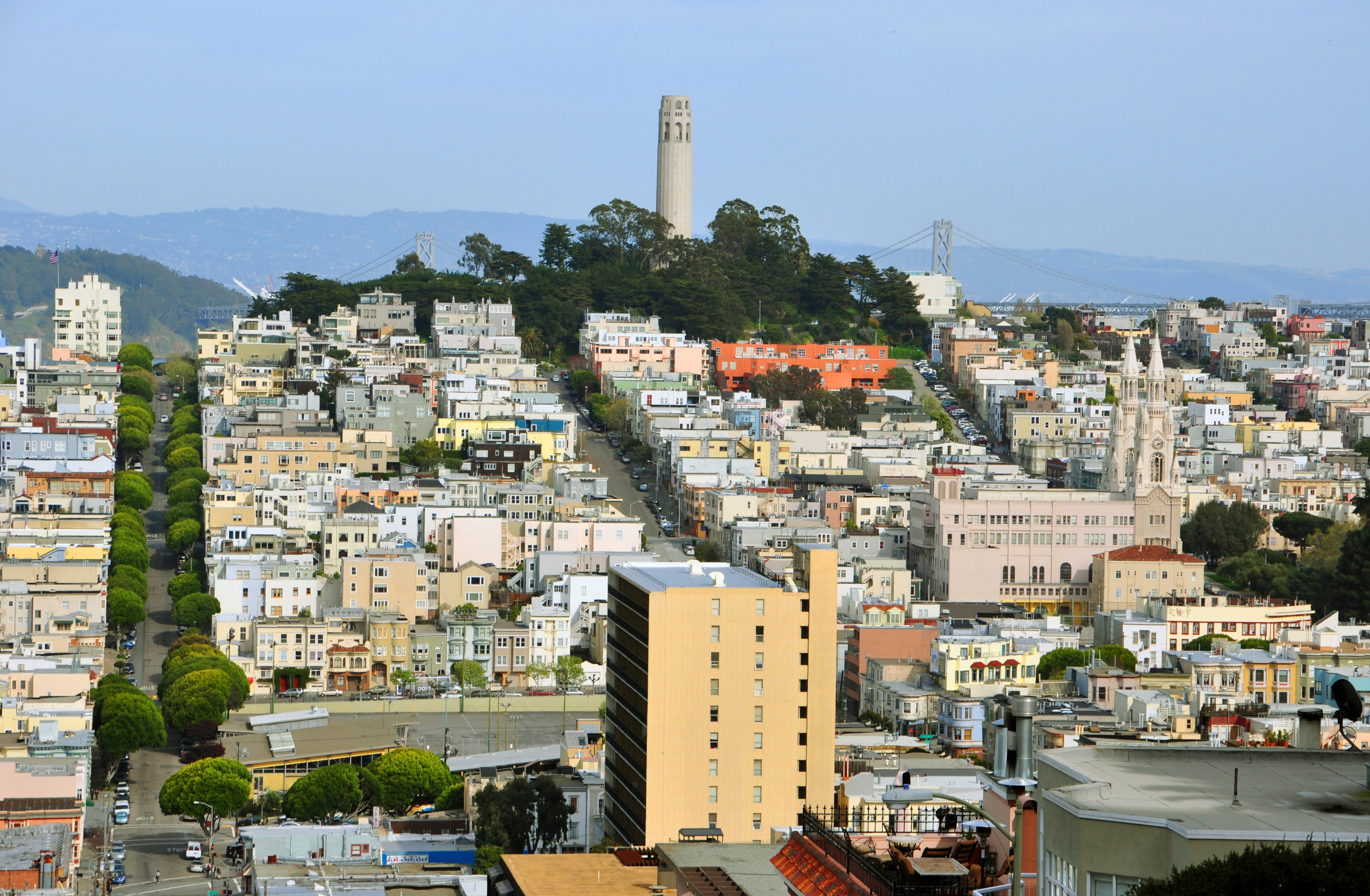
View from Lombard Street

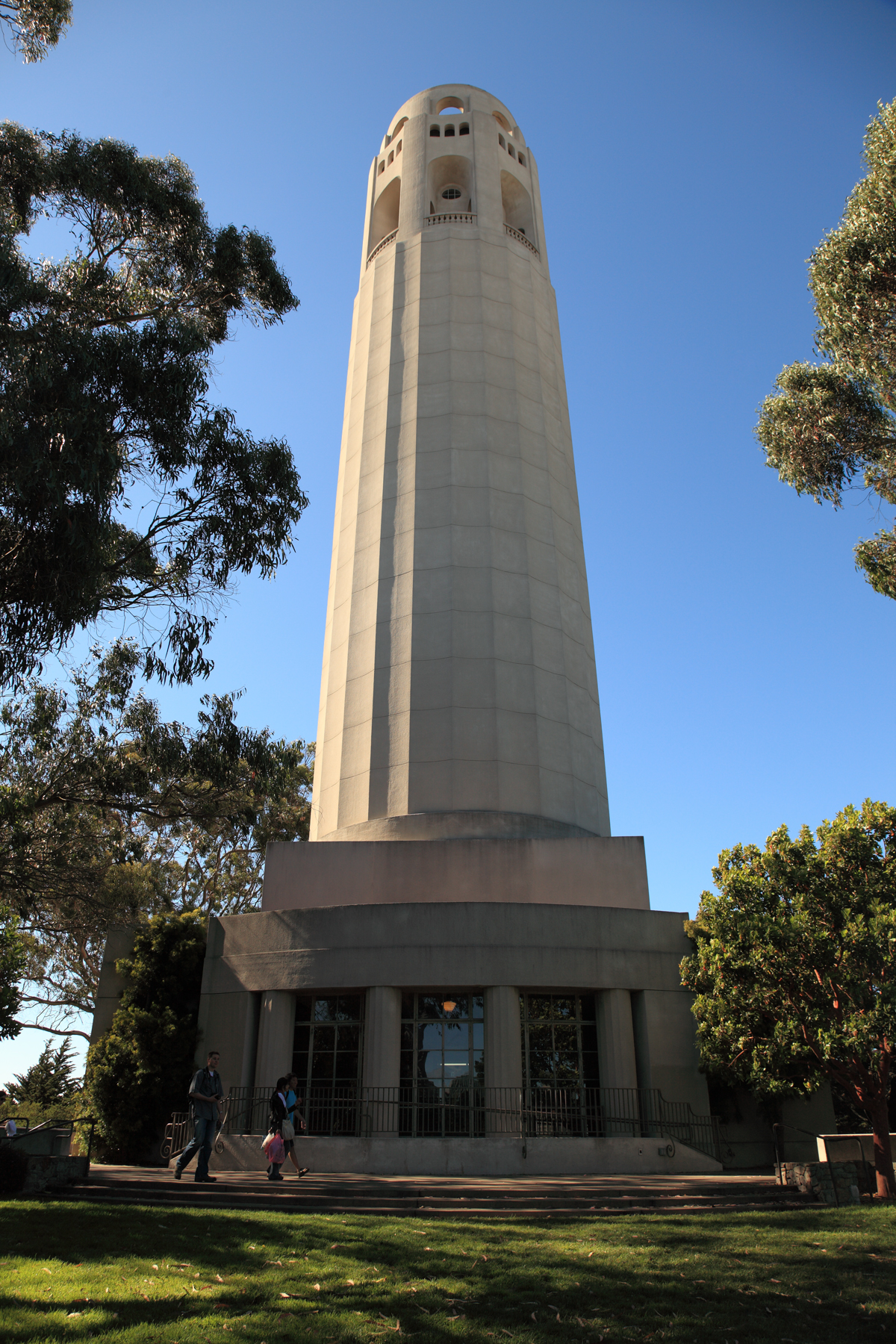
The south-facing side of Coit Tower

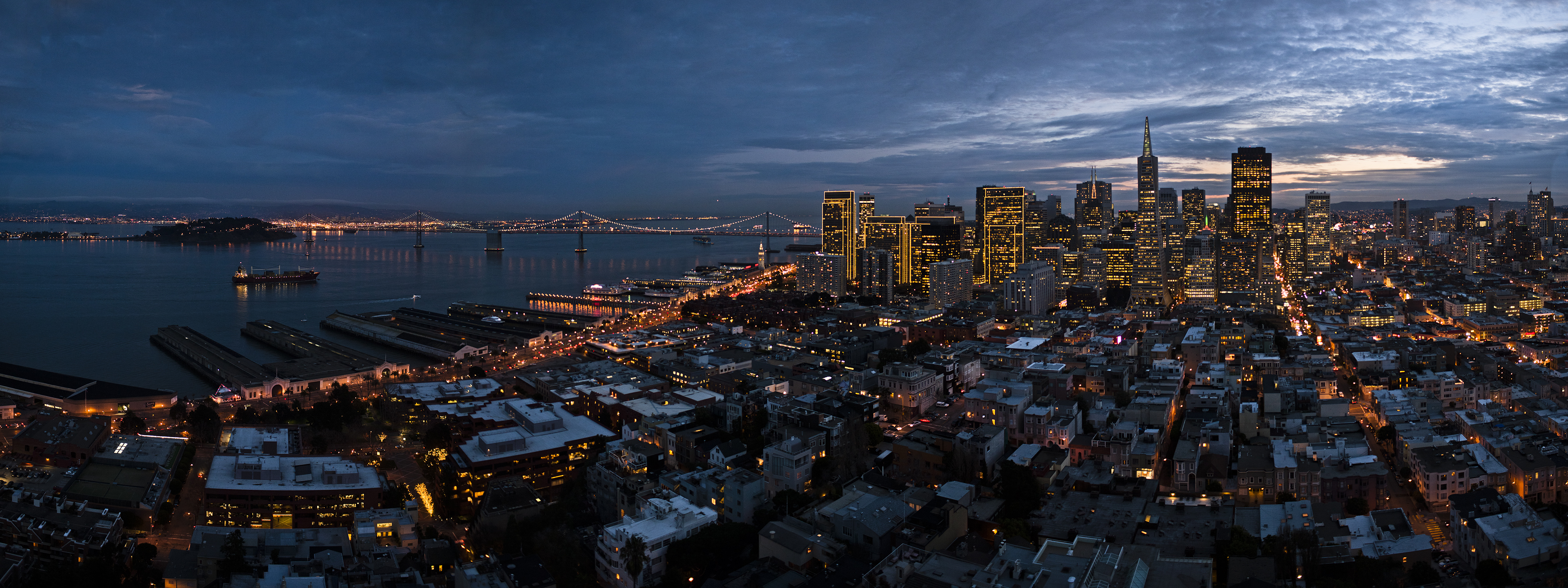
Looking south from the tower

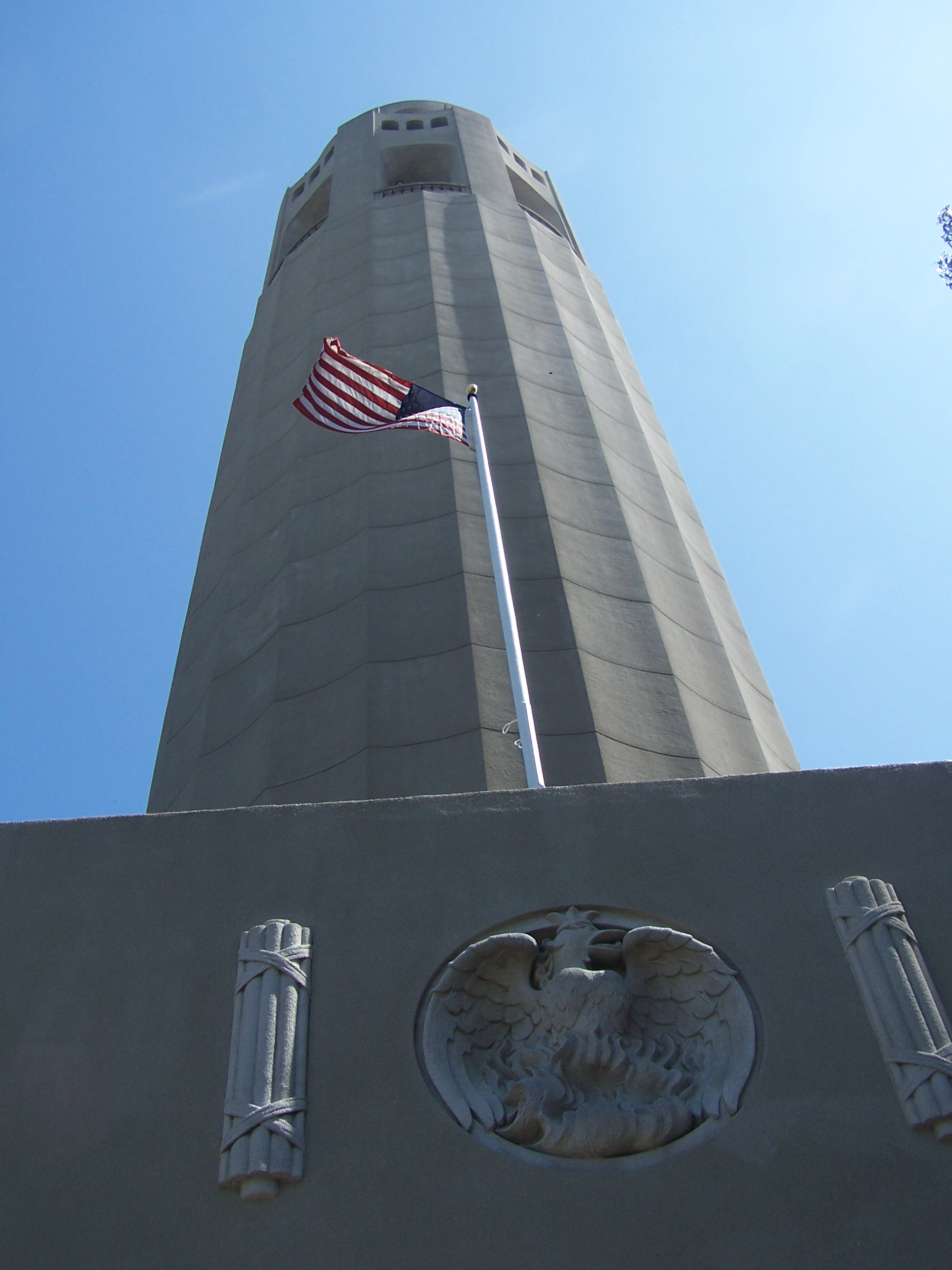
Looking up at the tower

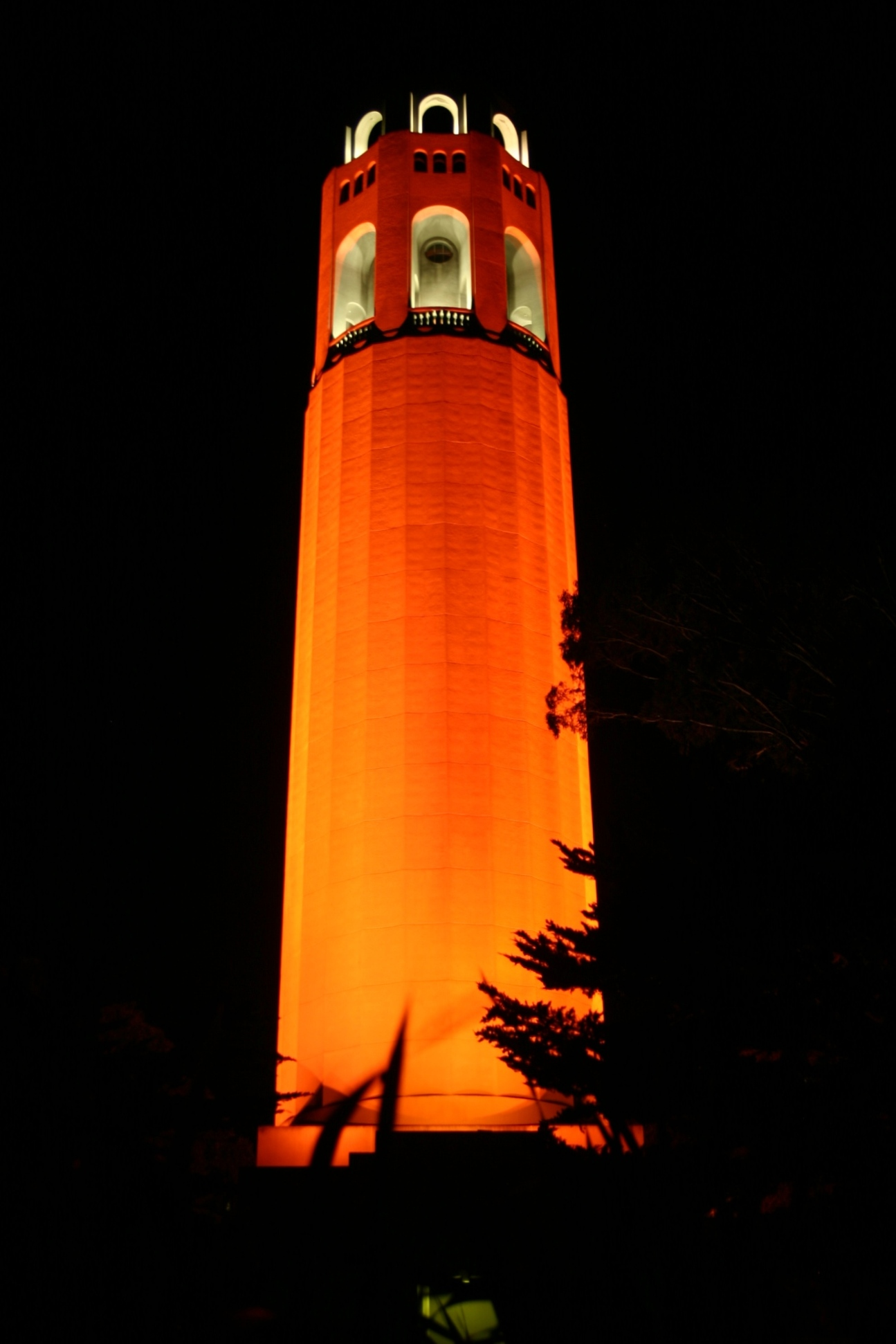
Coit Tower at night, lit orange in recognition of the San Francisco Giants

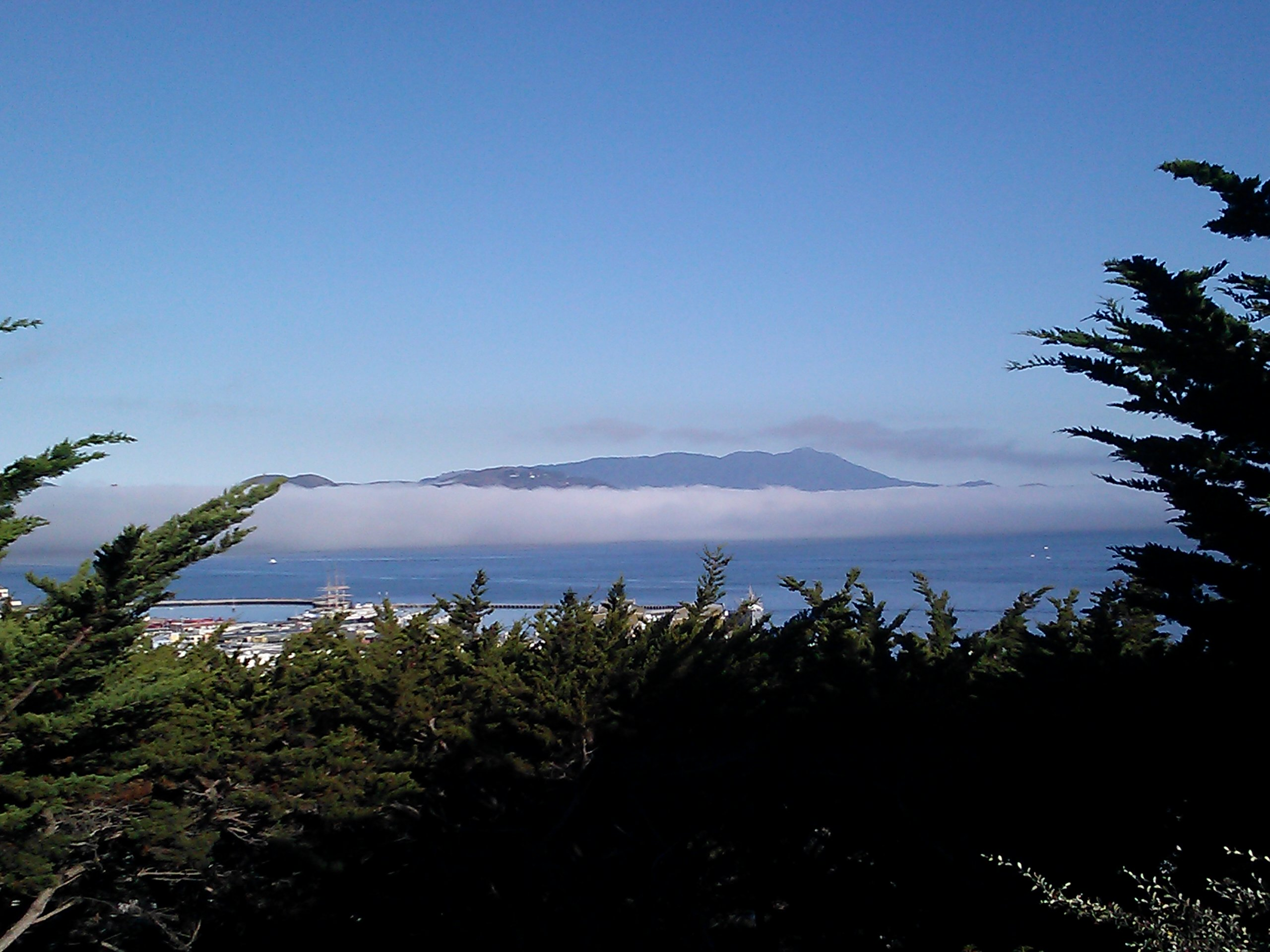
View of the bay from Coit Tower

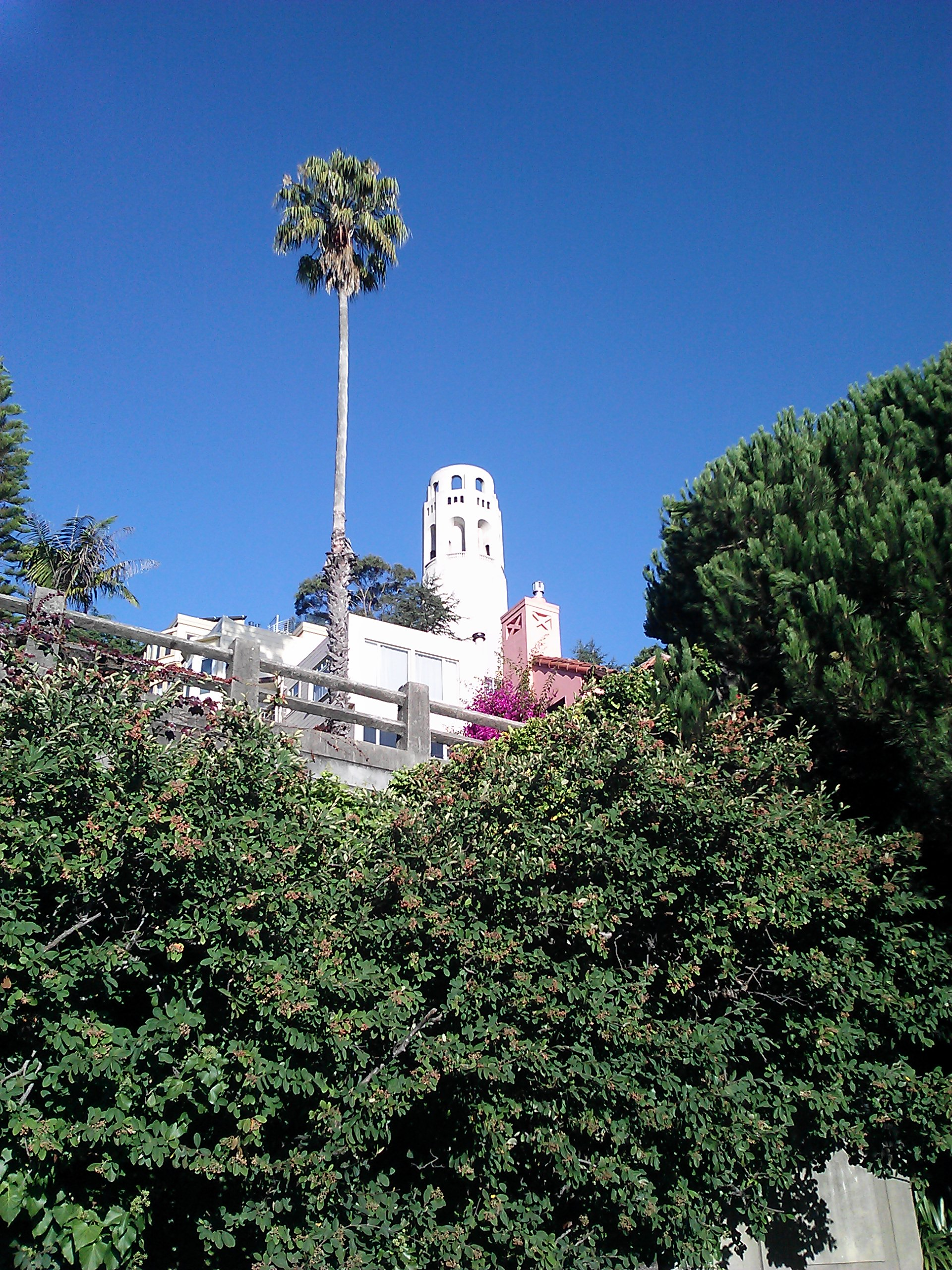
As seen from below

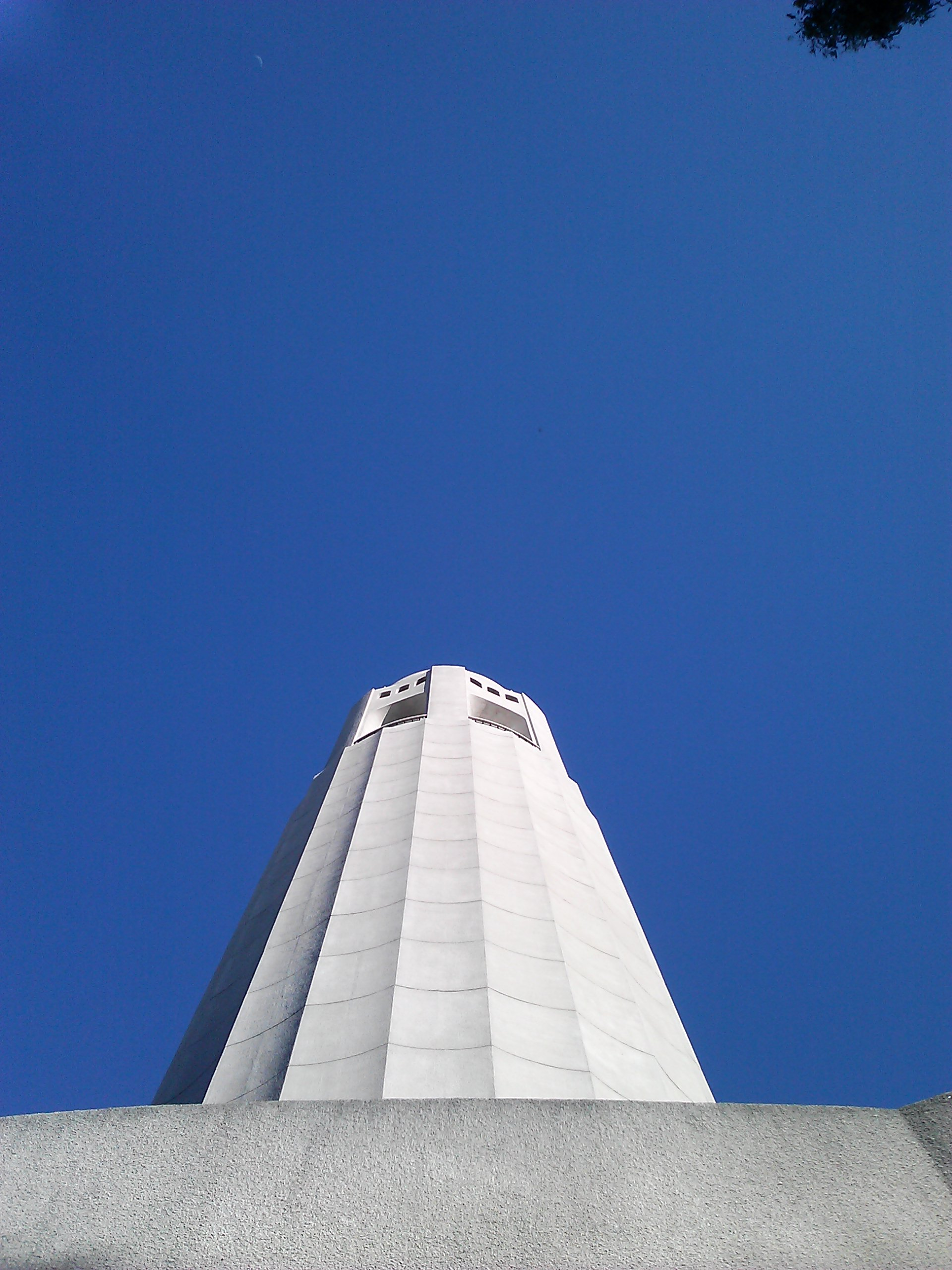
Vertical view

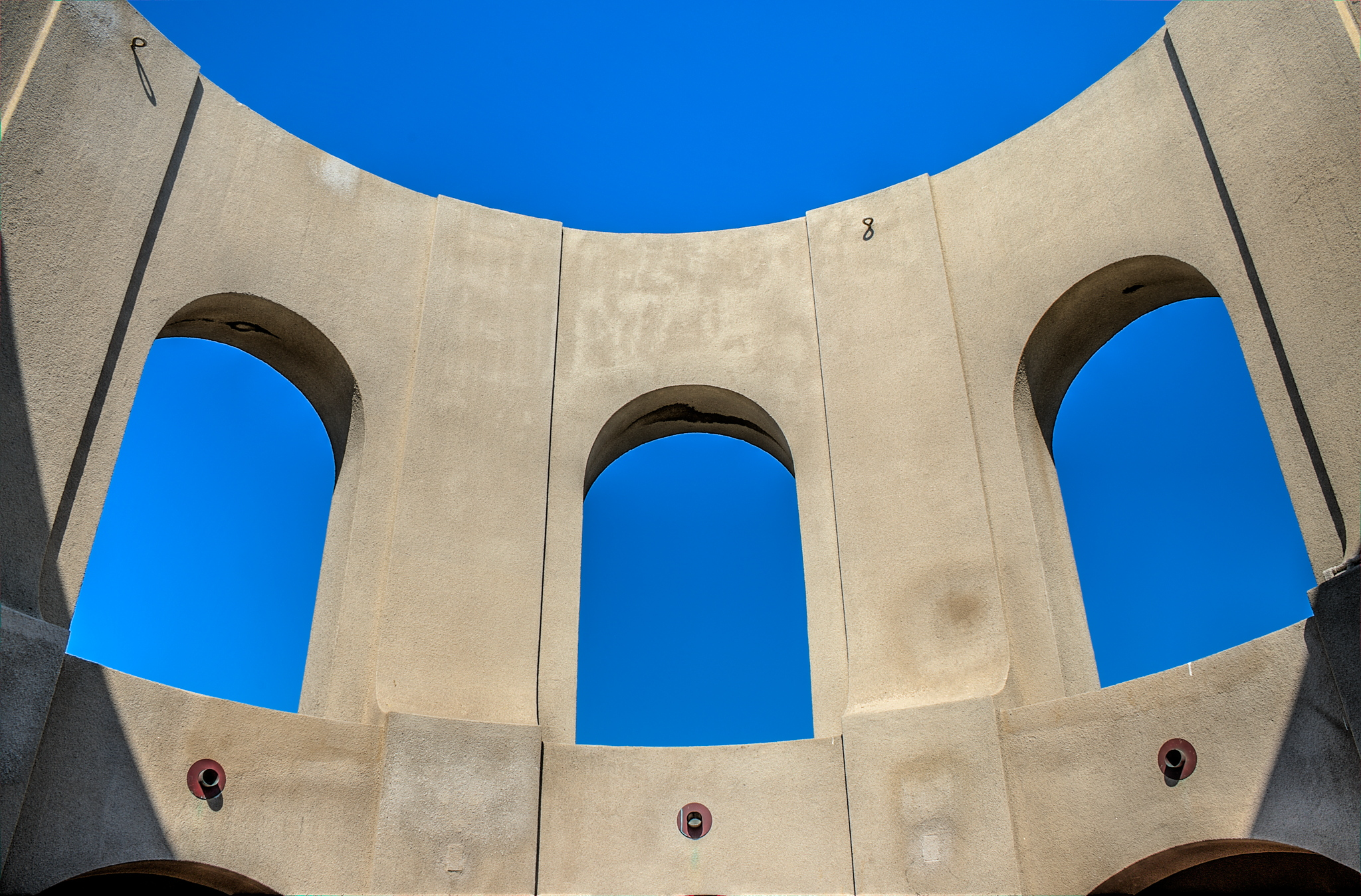
Detail of arches at the top of the tower

== In popular culture ==
Coit Tower is a prominent landscape feature in Alfred Hitchcock's 1958 film, Vertigo, set largely in San Francisco. The character of Madeleine (Kim Novak) tells Scotty (James Stewart) that she has used the tower to orient herself to his apartment, as she did not know his street address; he responds this is the first time he had been grateful for the tower. Art director Henry Bumstead, who worked on Vertigo, noted that Hitchcock was adamant that Coit Tower should be seen in the film from the apartment of the lead character, portrayed by Stewart. When Bumstead asked why, Hitchcock said, "It's a phallic symbol."

Coit Tower is also featured in:

- After the Thin Man (1936): the roundabout in front of the tower served as the driveway for Nick and Nora Charles' home in San Francisco.
- The Strawberry Statement (1970)
- The Enforcer (1976)
- Tex Murphy series (1989–2014)
- California's Gold Episode 12004 (1991-2012)
- Just like Heaven (2005)
- X-Men: The Last Stand (2006)
- History Detectives Episode 709 August 24, 2009
- The Amazing Race 16 Leg 12 (2010)
- Cats & Dogs: The Revenge of Kitty Galore (2010)
- San Andreas (2015)
- Shang-Chi and the Legend of the Ten Rings (2021)
- Hero Inside Episode 9 January 7, 2024
- Ironside ( 1967 to 1975): Most episodes include images in episodes' during the opening footage that serves as the episodes' establishing sequence

== See also ==
- 49-Mile Scenic Drive
- History of San Francisco
- List of San Francisco Designated Landmarks
