= George Albert Harris =

American painter

George A. Harris
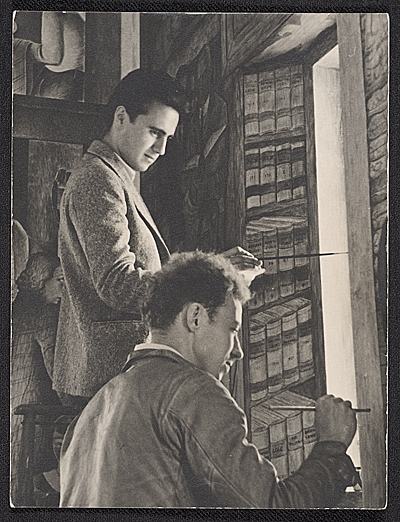
- George Albert Harris (standing) and Frederick E. Olmsted working on a Coit Tower mural together
- Born: January 24, 1913; San Francisco, California
- Died: September 25, 1991 (aged 78); France
- Style: Abstraction, Social Realism
- Movement: California Modernist Art

George Albert Harris, also known as George Harris (1913–1991), was an American painter, muralist, lithographer, and educator. He was a participant in the WPA Federal Art Project and was among the youngest artists on the mural project at Coit Tower. Harris' style is California Modernism, often working in abstraction, focusing primarily on still lifes and portraits.

== Biography ==
Harris was born in San Francisco on January 24, 1913 and pursued a career in music before beginning his art studies at the California School of Fine Arts (now called San Francisco Art Institute) in 1929, after which he traveled and studied in Mexico and Europe.

Harris’s 1934 Coit Tower mural called "Banking and Law" depicting the professions of banking and law, is memorable for its commentary on the economic conditions of the time. Imagery of stock market clerks tracking plummeting prices on the exchange, and bank guards with guns fiercely protecting bags of money, the world of finance is represented by the Federal Reserve Bank and a stock market ticker (in which stocks are shown as declining) and law is illustrated by a law library. Some of the book titles that appear in the law library, such as 'Civil, Penal, and Moral Codes', are legitimate, while others list fellow muralists as authors, in a joking or derogatory manner.

In 1935, Harris was included in the seminal opening exhibition of the San Francisco Museum of Art (now called San Francisco Museum of Modern Art or SFMOMA), where he was represented with two artworks alongside many well known California Modernists of the day.

Harris later earned an undergraduate degree at the College of Marin and a Ph.D. from Stanford University, where he became a professor of art. Throughout his career Harris also taught at San Francisco State College, California College of Arts & Crafts and Alcatraz Federal Penitentiary as well as other institutions.

Harris was chosen to paint a 27-foot mural for the San Francisco Chamber of Commerce building in 1950.

He had been a member of the San Francisco Art Association (SFAA) and the American Artists' Congress (AAC).

Harris moved to England in the 1970s. In 1980, Harris moved to southern France where he painted until his death on September 25, 1991.

== Legacy ==
George Albert Harris' works are in many public collections, including the San Francisco Museum of Modern Art, the Library of Congress, Fine Art Museums of San Francisco (FAMSF) and Carnegie Institute.

== See also ==
- Federal Art Project (FAP), a New Deal federal arts program operated by the Works Progress Administration (WPA) which ran from 1935 to 1943.
- Public Works of Art Project (PWAP)
- Section of Painting and Sculpture of the New Deal federal arts program also operated by the United States Department of the Treasury
