= John Langley Howard =

American artist (1902–1999)

- Born: February 5, 1902; Upper Montclair, New Jersey, US
- Died: November 15, 1999 (aged 97); San Francisco, California, US
- Other names: Lang Howard
- Father: John Galen Howard
- Relatives: Robert Boardman Howard (brother)

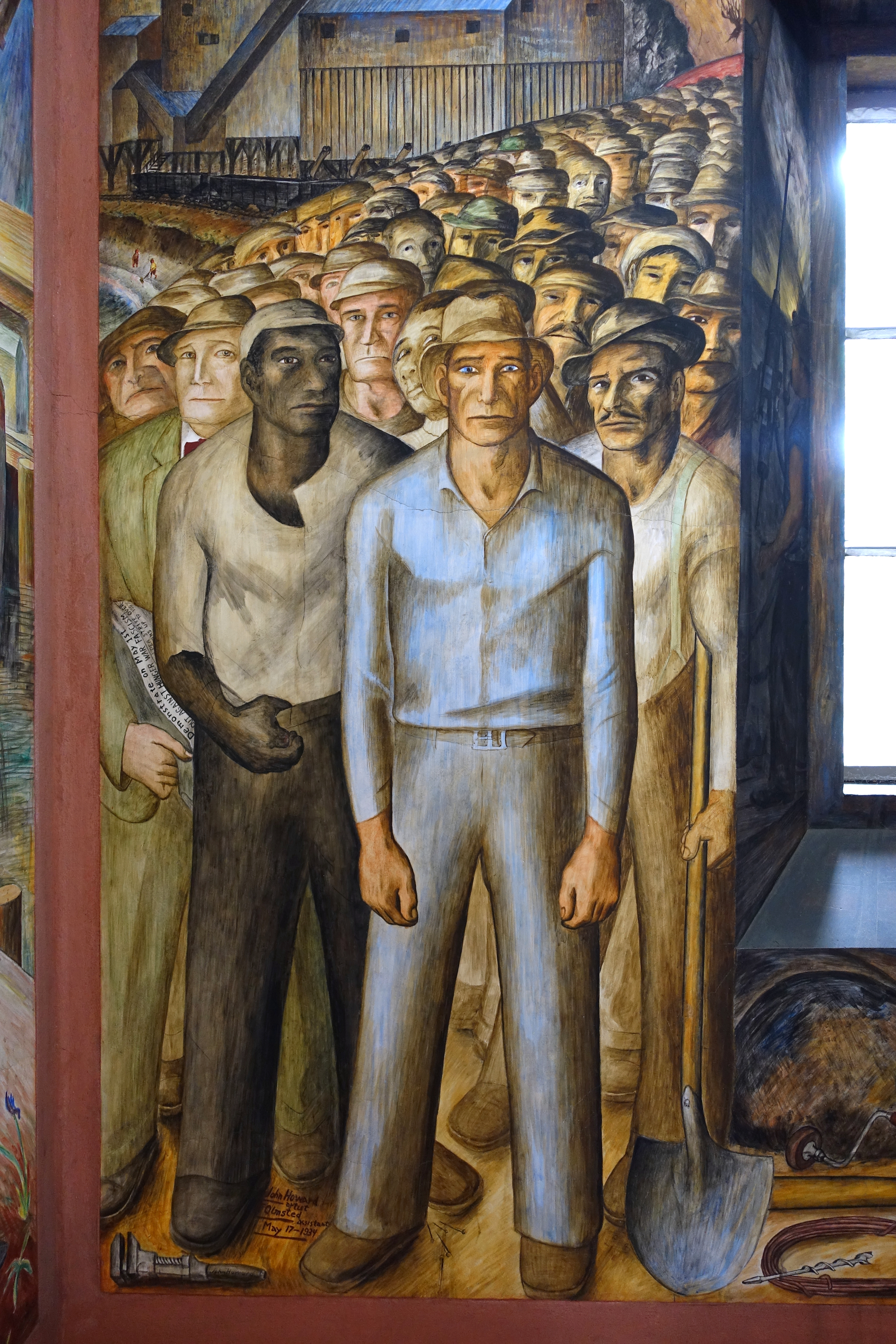
California Industrial Scenes mural detail at Coit Tower in San Francisco

John Langley "Lang" Howard (1902–1999) was an American artist, known as a Social Realist muralist, printmaker and illustrator.

== Biography ==
John Langley Howard was born in Upper Montclair, New Jersey, on February 5, 1902, the son of architect John Galen Howard and Mary Robertson Bradbury. His siblings included Henry Temple Howard (1894–1967), Robert Boardman Howard (1896–1983), Charles Houghton Howard (1899–1978), and Jeanette Howard Wallace (1905–1998). The family moved to California in 1904. They settled in Berkeley, where John Galen Howard was hired to supervise the erection of the Hearst Memorial Mining Building at the University of California, Berkeley.

John Langley Howard attended University of California, Berkeley and studied engineering and English for one semester, leaving in 1922. He switched to study art and initially enrolled in California College of Arts and Crafts and later at Art Students League of New York with Kenneth Hayes Miller.

He painted one of the Coit Tower murals, California Industrial Scenes. The mural was designed as a result of the atrocity of the Great Depression, and featured Karl Marx imagery which caused controversy when it was unveiled.

From 1953 until 1965, Howard illustrated many covers for Scientific American magazine. He also created illustrations for Sports Illustrated magazine.

Howard was married three times Adelaide Scofield Day Howard (in 1925); Blanche Phillips (in 1949); and Mary McMahon (in 1980).

He died on November 15, 1999, in his home in the Potrero Hill neighborhood of San Francisco, California.
