= List of United States post office murals in California =

Following is a list of United States post office murals created in California between 1934 and 1943.

| Location | Mural title | Image | Artist | Date | Notes | NRHP listed |
|---|---|---|---|---|---|---|
| Alhambra | El Gringo, El Indio, El Paysan | | Gordon K. Grant | 1938 | painted over | |
| United States Post Office, Berkeley | Incidents in California History | | Suzanne Scheuer | 1937 | tempera and oil on canvas | 1981 |
| Beverly Hills Main Post Office, Beverly Hills | Postrider, Airmail, et al. | | Charles Kassler | 1936 | fresco | 1985 |
| Burbank | People of Burbank | | Barse Miller | 1940 | | 1985 |
| Calexico | Lettuce Workers | | George Samerjan | 1942 | tempera on gesso; now privately owned | |
| Canoga Park | Palomino Ponies | | Maynard Dixon | 1942 | | |
| Claremont | Pomona Valley Life, 1930 | | Milford Zornes | 1937 | oil on canvas | |
| Claremont | California Landscape | | Milford Zornes | 1937 | oil on canvas | |
| Compton | Early California | | James Redmond | 1936 | | |
| Culver City | Studio Lot | | George Samerjan | 1942 | tempera | |
| United States Post Office and Courthouse, Eureka | Mining and Forestry | | Tom Laman | 1936 | tempera on canvas; restored and relocated to the United States federal courthouse in McKinleyville | 1983 |
| United States Post Office and Courthouse, Eureka | Water and Land | | Tom Laman | 1936 | tempera on canvas; restored and relocated to the United States federal courthouse in McKinleyville | 1983 |
| Fullerton | Orange Pickers | | Paul Julian | 1942 | oil on canvas | |
| Hayward | Rural Landscape | | Tom E. Lewis | 1938 | | |
| Huntington Park | History of California | | Norman S. Chamberlain | 1937 | oil on canvas seven panels | |
| La Jolla | Scenic View of the Village | | Belle Baranceanu | 1936 | oil on canvas | |
| Lancaster | Hauling Water Pipe through Antelope Valley | | Jose Moya del Pino | 1941 | oil on canvas | |
| U.S. Post Office – Los Angeles Terminal Annex, Los Angeles | Cultural Contributions of North, South and Central America | | Boris Deutsch | 1944 | fresco, eleven lunettes | 1985 |
| Spring Street Courthouse Los Angeles | Los Angeles — Prehistoric and Spanish Colonial | | Edward Biberman | 1940 | | 2006 |
| Spring Street Courthouse Los Angeles | Creative Man | | Edward Biberman | 1941 | in storage | 2006 |
| Spring Street Courthouse Los Angeles | Life on the Old Spanish and American Ranchos | | Lucien Labaudt | 1938 | | 2006 |
| Los Banos | Early Spanish Caballeros | | Lew E. Davis | 1940 | on display at Milliken Museum | |
| Manteca | Rural Life | | Conrad Buff | 1940 | Missing or destroyed | |
| Martinez | The Road to Eldorado | | Edith Hamlin; Maynard Dixon | 1939 | oil on canvas | |
| Maywood | Industry | | George Samerjan | 1939 | missing or destroyed | |
| United States Post Office, Merced | Jedediah Smith Crossing the Merced River | | Helen Katharine Forbes | 1937 | tempera | 1983 |
| United States Post Office, Merced | Vacheros | | Dorothy Wagner Puccinelli | 1937 | tempera | 1983 |
| El Viejo Post Office, Modesto | Irrigation | | Ray Boynton | 1936 | | |
| El Viejo Post Office, Modesto | Agricultural Products of the Valley | | Ray Boynton | 1936 | | |
| El Viejo Post Office, Modesto | Harvesting of Grapes | | Ray Boynton | 1936 | | |
| El Viejo Post Office, Modesto | Packing Cheese | | Ray Boynton | 1936 | | |
| El Viejo Post Office, Modesto | Grain Harvesting | | Ray Boynton | 1936 | | |
| El Viejo Post Office, Modesto | Meatpacking | | Ray Boynton | 1936 | | |
| El Viejo Post Office, Modesto | Sorting Grapes | | Ray Boynton | 1936 | | |
| El Viejo Post Office, Modesto | Tractor and Plow | | Ray Boynton | 1936 | | |
| Monrovia | Grizzly Bear and Cubs | | Helen Katharine Forbes | 1940 | restored and on display at Monrovia Public Library | |
| Montebello | Fiesta Procession in Old California | | Clay Spohn | 1938 | tempera, destroyed | |
| Monterey | Monterey Bay | | Henrietta Shore | 1937 | | |
| Oceanside | Air Mail | | Elise Seeds | 1937 | oil on canvas | |
| Ontario | The Dream | | Nellie G. Best | 1942 | oil on canvas | |
| Ontario | The Reality | | Nellie G. Best | 1942 | oil on canvas | |
| Oxnard | Oxnard Panorama | | Daniel M. Mendelowitz | 1941 | | |
| Pacific Grove | Lovers Point | | Victor Arnautoff | 1940 | | |
| Placerville | Forest Genetics | | Tom E. Lewis | 1941 | oil on canvas | |
| Redondo Beach | Excursion Train and Picknickers in the Nineties | | Paul Sample | 1937 | oil on canvas | |
| Redondo Beach | Fishing from Redondo Rock | | Paul Sample | 1937 | oil on canvas | |
| Redondo Beach | Sheep Farming and Ocean near Redondo | | Paul Sample | 1937 | oil on canvas | |
| Redwood City | Flower Farming and Vegetable Raising | | Jose Moya del Pino | 1937 | oil on canvas | |
| Reedley | Grape Pickers | | Boris Deutsch | 1941 | oil on canvas | |
| Richmond | Richmond – Industrial City | | Victor Arnautoff | 1941 | oil on canvas; missing 1976–2014; restored in 2020 and installed at the Richmond Museum of History and Culture | |
| Saint Helena | Grape Pickers | | Lew Keller | 1942 | oil on canvas | |
| San Francisco | History of San Francisco | | Anton Refregier | 1946–48 | tempera on gesso | 1979 |
| San Gabriel | San Gabriel County | | Ray Strong | 1938 | oil on canvas; located in the office of the postmaster | |
| San Mateo | Life in Early California | | Tom Laman | 1935 | egg tempera on plasterboard. set of three murals | 1988 |
| United States Post Office, San Pedro | Mail Transportation | | Fletcher Martin | 1938 | oil on canvas | 1985 |
| San Rafael | San Rafael Creek – 1851 | | Oscar Galgiani | 1937 | oil on paperboard | |
| Santa Cruz | Cabbage Culture | | Henrietta Shore | 1936 | oil on canvas | 1985 |
| Santa Cruz | Limestone Quarries | | Henrietta Shore | 1936 | oil on canvas | 1985 |
| Santa Cruz | Artichoke Raising | | Henrietta Shore | 1936 | oil on canvas | 1985 |
| Santa Cruz | Fishing Industry | | Henrietta Shore | 1936 | oil on canvas | 1985 |
| Sebastopol | Agriculture | | Malette Dean | 1937 | oil on canvas | |
| Selma | Land of Irrigation | | Norman S. Chamberlain | 1938 | oil on canvas | |
| South Pasadena | The Stage Coach | | John Law Walker | 1937 | oil on canvas | |
| South San Francisco | South San Francisco, Past and Present | | Victor Arnautoff | 1941 | oil on canvas | |
| Stockton | Modern Transportation of the Mails | | Frank Bergman | 1936 | oil on canvas | |
| Stockton | The U.S. Mail Stage Coach | | Jose Moya del Pino | 1936 | oil on canvas | |
| Susanville | Deer | | Helen Katharine Forbes | 1939 | egg tempera | |
| Tracy | Overland Pioneers | | Edith Hamlin | 1938 | oil on canvas, currently missing | |
| Tracy | Spaniards | | Edith Hamlin | 1938 | oil on canvas | |
| Tracy | Days of First Railroad | | Edith Hamlin | 1938 | oil on canvas | |
| Turlock | Arrival of the Stage | | James Albert Holden | 1938 | oil on canvas | |
| Ukiah | Resources of the Soil | | Ben Cunningham | 1938 | egg tempera; moved to Ukiah Civic Center/Ukiah City Hall | |
| Vacaville | Fruit Season, Vacaville | | Emrich Nicholson | 1939 | oil on canvas, now privately owned | |
| Venice | The Story of Venice | | Edward Biberman | 1941 | oil-wax emulsion on canvas; now privately owned by Joel Silver | |
| Ventura | Agriculture and Industries of Ventura | | Gordon K. Grant | 1938 | oil on canvas | |
| Whittier | Boy with Sheep | | Tom Laman | 1938 | tempera, painted over | |
| Woodland | Farm Life | | George Harris | 1937 | | |
| Woodland | The Trek of Father Crespi, 1777 | | Katherine S. Works | 1938 | destroyed | |
