= List of United States post offices in California =

United States post offices operate under the authority of the United States Post Office Department (1792–1971) or the United States Postal Service (since 1971). Historically, post offices were usually placed in a prominent location. Many were architecturally distinctive, including notable buildings featuring Beaux-Arts, Art Deco, and Vernacular architecture. However, modern U.S. post offices were generally designed for functionality rather than architectural style.

Following is a list of United States post offices in California. Notable post offices include individual buildings, whether still in service or not, which have architectural, historical, or community-related significance. Many of these are listed on the National Register of Historic Places (NRHP) or state and local historic registers.

Post office	City	Date built	Image	Architect	Notes	Ref.
United States Post Office – Alhambra, California	Alhambra	1935–1936		John W. Smart		
United States Post Office (Berkeley, California)	Berkeley	1914		Oscar Wenderoth	(Note: Listed on the National Register of Historic Places)	
Beverly Hills Main Post Office	Beverly Hills	1934		Ralph Carlin Flewelling, Allison & Allison		
United States Post Office (Burbank, California)	Burbank	1937		Gilbert Stanley Underwood		
United States Post Office, now Chico Midtown Station	Chico	1914		J. W. Roberts, Oscar Wenderoth	(Note: No longer used as a post office.)	
El Centro Main Post Office	El Centro	1931–1932		James A. Wetmore, Louis A. Simon		
United States Post Office and Courthouse (Eureka, California)	Eureka	1910		James Knox Taylor		
Fullerton Post Office	Fullerton	1939		Roy A. Benjamin		
Glendale Main Post Office	Glendale	1934		George M. Lindsay		
Hollywood Post Office	Hollywood, Los Angeles	1925		Morgan, Walls & Clements	(Note: Building has been demolished.)	
United States Post Office (Hollywood, California)	Hollywood, Los Angeles	1937		Claud Beelman		
La Jolla Post Office	La Jolla	1935		Louis A. Simon		
Long Beach Main Post Office	Long Beach	1934		James A. Wetmore, Louis A. Simon		
US Court House and Post Office, now Spring Street Courthouse	Los Angeles	1937–1940		Gilbert Stanley Underwood, Louis A. Simon		
U.S. Post Office-Los Angeles Terminal Annex	Los Angeles	1940		Gilbert Stanley Underwood		
United States Post Office-Martinez Downtown	Martinez	1936–1937		Louis A. Simon		
United States Post Office--Marysville Main	Marysville	1932–1934		James A. Wetmore		
United States Post Office (Merced, California)	Merced	1933		Allison & Allison		
El Viejo Post Office	Modesto	1933		James A. Wetmore		
United States Post Office (Napa, California)	Napa	1933		William H. Corlett		
Newbury Park Post Office	Newbury Park	1875, 1968				
Main Post Office and Federal Building (Oakland, California)	Oakland	1931		James A. Wetmore, William A. Newman		
United States Post Office-Oroville Main	Oroville	1932–1933				
United States Post Office (Palo Alto, California)	Palo Alto	1932–1933		Birge Clark		
United States Post Office (Petaluma, California)	Petaluma	1933		James A. Wetmore, Louis A. Simon		
United States Post Office (Porterville, California)	Porterville	1933–1937		H. Rafael Lake		
United States Post Office (Redlands, California)	Redlands	1932–1935		G. Stanley Wilson		
U.S. Post Office, Courthouse and Federal Building, now Federal Building (Sacramento)	Sacramento	1932–1933		Starks and Flanders		
San Bernardino Downtown Station	San Bernardino	1931		James A. Wetmore, Louis A. Simon		
United States Post Office-Downtown Station (San Diego, California)	San Diego	1936–1938		William Templeton Johnson		
United States Post Office (San Fernando, California)	San Fernando	1934		Louis A. Simon, George O. Von Nerta		
Ferry Station Post Office Building	San Francisco	1915		A. A. Pyle		
U.S. Post Office and Courthouse, now James R. Browning United States Court of Appeals Building	San Francisco	1897–1905		James Knox Taylor	(Note: Building is a National Historic Landmark.)	
Rincon Center (formerly Rincon Annex)	San Francisco	1940		Gilbert Stanley Underwood		
Old Post Office San Jose	San Jose	1933		Ralph Wyckoff	(Note: Contributing property to St. James Square Historic District.)	
U.S. Post Main Office–San Mateo, now St. Matthew Station	San Mateo	1936				
United States Post Office (San Pedro, Los Angeles)	San Pedro	1936		Louis A. Simon		
United States Post Office Station-Spurgeon Station	Santa Ana					
United States Post Office-Santa Barbara Main	Santa Barbara	1937		Reginald Davis Johnson		
US Post Office--Santa Cruz Main	Santa Cruz	1936		James Knox Taylor		
Old Post Office–Santa Monica	Santa Monica	1937–1938		Louis A. Simon, Neal A. Melick		
Old Post Office (Santa Rosa, California), now Museum of Sonoma County	Santa Rosa	1910		James Knox Taylor		
United States Post Office (Stockton, California)	Stockton	1932–1933		Bliss and Fairweather, Howard G. Bissell		
Ukiah Main Post Office	Ukiah	1937		Louis A. Simon, Neal A. Melick		
United States Post Office (Venice, California)	Venice	1939		Louis A. Simon, Neal A. Melick		
United States Post Office-Visalia Town Center Station	Visalia	1932–1933		William D. Coates		
United States Post Office (Willows, California)	Willows	1918		Walter Danforth Bliss, William Baker Faville		
