= Tom Laman =

American artist (1901–1964)

Thomas Laman
- Born: September 23, 1901; Walla Walla, Washington, U.S.
- Died: January 25, 1964 (aged 62); San Francisco, California, U.S.
- Occupations: Muralist, sculptor, horticulturalist
- Known for: New Deal artwork

Thomas Laman (September 23, 1901–January 25, 1964) was an American painter, sculptor, mosaicist, horticulturalist, and furniture designer. He is best remembered for his public artwork at courthouses and post offices, produced under New Deal arts programs.

== Biography ==
Laman was born in 1901 in Walla Walla, Washington. He did a wood sculpture project at Timberline Lodge in Oregon. Also at Timberline Lodge, Laman collaborated with Virginia Darcé on a glass-and-ceramic mosaic called Spring on the Mountain. He sculpted Benjamin Franklin in Portland, Oregon. Laman moved to San Francisco around 1930. He studied at the California School of Fine Arts.

His mural of deer for the Eureka Post Office and Federal Courthouse, for one of the New Deal art projects, was well-reviewed by critic Leila Mechlin: "in line and feeling, the illusive qualities of the subject are here beautifully rendered." Another mural intended for the same site was Pelicans. A third was Land, Mining, Water, and Forestry. Merlin C. Hardy assisted Laman in painting the Eureka murals. They created five tempera panels. The Eureka courthouse closed and became private property in 2002. In 2015, the five Laman paintings were relocated to the U.S. District Court for the Northern District of California courthouse in McKinleyville, California.

In 1937 he created Life in Early California in egg tempera for the St. Matthew's Station post office in San Mateo, California. Boy With Sheep was a 6'7" x 14'5" tempera painting that debuted at the Bailey Station post office in Whittier, California, in May 1938. Missing for many years, it may simply have been painted over.

In 1937 he was president of the California Society of Mural Artists and was invited to be artist-in-residence at Wesleyan University in Connecticut. He was a founder of the Bay Area Bonsai Society. Laman died in San Francisco in 1964.

== See also ==
- List of United States federal courthouses in California
- List of United States post office murals in California

== Sources ==
- Bustard, Bruce I. (Spring 1997). "Timberline Lodge: Oregon's WPA Masterpiece". Prologue: Quarterly of the National Archives and Records Administration. 29 (1): 7–16. ISSN 0033-1031.
- Gelber, Steven M. (July 1, 1979). "Working to Prosperity: California's New Deal Murals". California History. 58 (2): 98–127. doi:10.2307/25157905. ISSN 0162-2897. JSTOR 25157905.
