= Emerson Community Charter School =

Coordinates: 34.053954°N 118.436092°W

Ralph Waldo Emerson Community Charter School
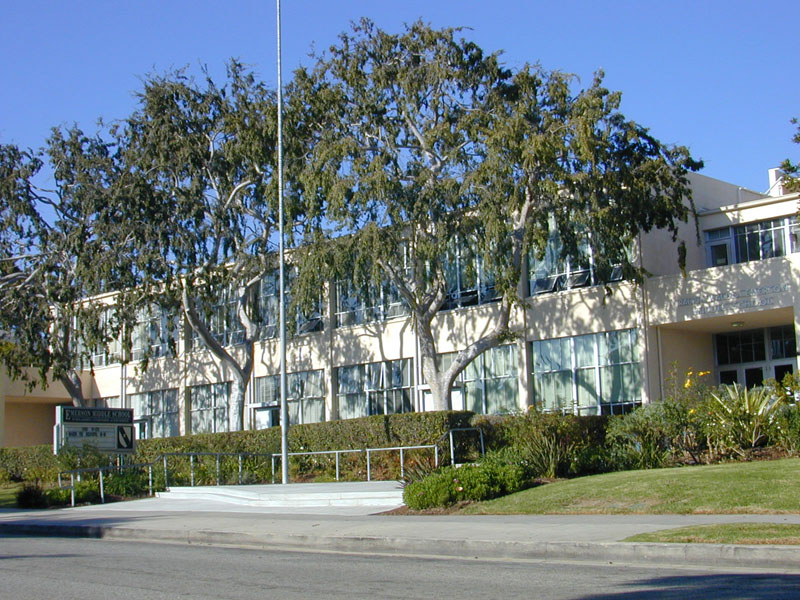
- 1650 Selby Avenue; Los Angeles, California

Information
- Type: Public secondary
- School district: Los Angeles Unified School District
- Principal: Lauren McNally
- Staff: 25.00 (FTE)
- Grades: 6–8
- Enrollment: 516 (2025-2026)
- Student to teacher ratio: 24.52
- Website: emersoncc.lausd.org

Ralph Waldo Emerson Community Charter School (formerly Ralph Waldo Emerson Middle School and commonly referred to as Emerson) is a Secondary School in the Los Angeles Unified School District in Westwood, Los Angeles, California, United States. It was designed by famed architect Richard Neutra and was named in honor of Ralph Waldo Emerson, the American author, poet, and philosopher.

The school offers special academic programs, including the Mathematics Engineering and Science Achievement (MESA), the School for Advanced Studies (SAS), and the Individualized Honors Program (IHP). Marilyn Monroe & Bonnie Raitt both attended Emerson. Michael Jackson, albeit only one semester, and La Toya Jackson, as well as the lead singer of the Red Hot Chili Peppers, Anthony Kiedis, also studied there.

On June 10, 2014, the Los Angeles Unified School District Board granted the school Affiliate Charter status, thus adding Emerson to Los Angeles' growing roster of charter schools.

Emerson's Performing Arts Academy (terminated in 2012) offered classes including Musical Theater, Stage Design, Costume Design, and Dance.

== Attendance area ==
Neighborhoods served by Emerson Middle include West Los Angeles, Beverly Glen, Beverly Hills Post Office Westwood, Bel-Air, Sawtelle, Benedict Canyon, the Wilshire Corridor, and Holmby Hills. Also included in its service area are canyon neighborhoods adjacent to the city of Beverly Hills; since the neighborhoods are in Los Angeles, the students are not in the Beverly Hills Unified School District boundaries.

== Feeder schools ==
Public elementary Schools that feed into Emerson include:

- Fairburn Elementary School
- Saturn Elementary School
- Warner Avenue Elementary School
- Westwood Charter School
- Nora Sterry Elementary School
- Carthay Elementary School
- Brockton Elementary School.

Students that graduate from Emerson often go to University High School, Hamilton High School, or Venice High School.

== Architecture ==
Emerson Middle School's main building was designed by architect Richard Neutra in the International Style of Architecture, and built between 1937 and 1938. It is a two-story, steel-framed structure with strong horizontals. The first-floor classrooms have large, 15-foot glass and steel sliding doors that open to extend the spaces to the outside, while the second-floor classrooms have stairs leading to rooftop terraces. Due to its streamlined and clean appearance, "Emerson Middle School was considered a leading example of 1930s Modernism," along with Frank Lloyd Wright's Fallingwater House and Walter Gropius's House.
