= Warren Hastings Miller =

American editor, author

- Born: c. 1878; Honesdale, Pennsylvania, U.S.
- Died: July 14, 1960; Melbourne, Florida, U.S.
- Education: Stevens Institute of Technology
- Occupations: Editor, author
- Spouse(s): Susan Barse Miller; Elizabeth White
- Children: 4 sons (including Barse Miller), 1 daughter

Warren Hastings Miller (c. 1878 – July 14, 1960) was an American editor of the magazine Field & Stream, an avid camper and designer, and the author of at least 32 books ranging from outdoor guides to pulp fiction. He designed, described, and used the first Forester tent.

== Reprinted fiction ==
- Raider of the Seas: Captain Jim Colvin and the Log of the Pulo Siburu (Black Dog Books, 2011)
- High Adventure #152 (reprints Far East stories)
- High Adventure #172 (reprints Foreign Legion Stories: The Hell's Angels Squad)
- High Adventure #177 (reprints war stories)
