= Beverly Hills Post Office =

Area of Los Angeles, California

Coordinates: 34°4′20.9″N 118°24′6.65″W

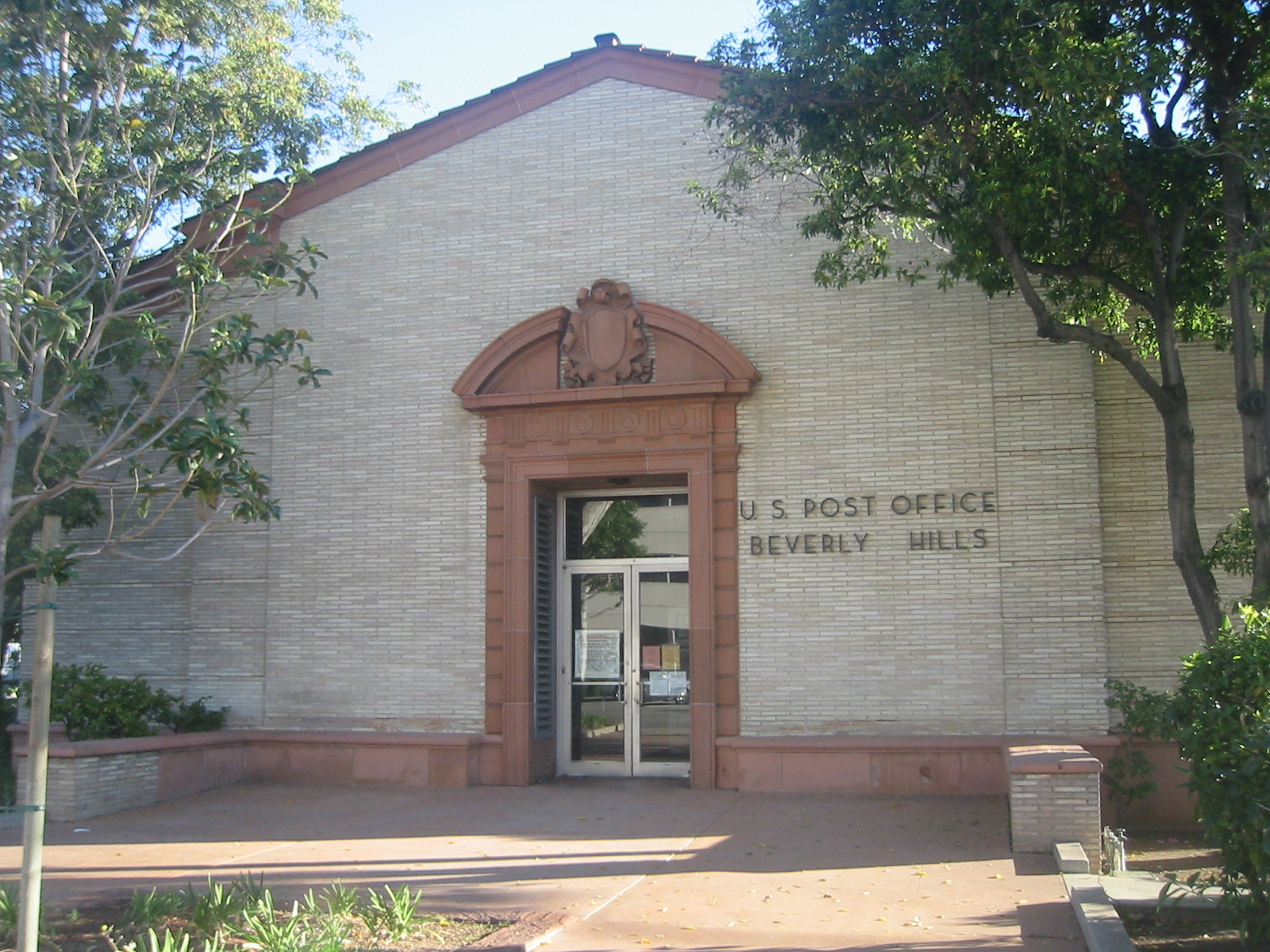
The old Beverly Hills Main Post Office, 469 N. Crescent Dr. at Santa Monica Boulevard in Beverly Hills, served Beverly Hills and the BHPO area of Los Angeles from 1934 to the 1990s.

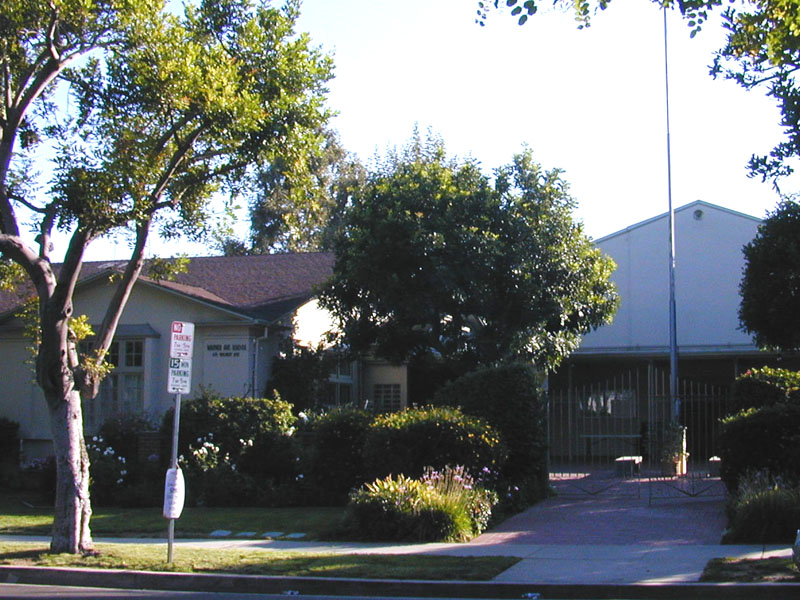
Warner Avenue School

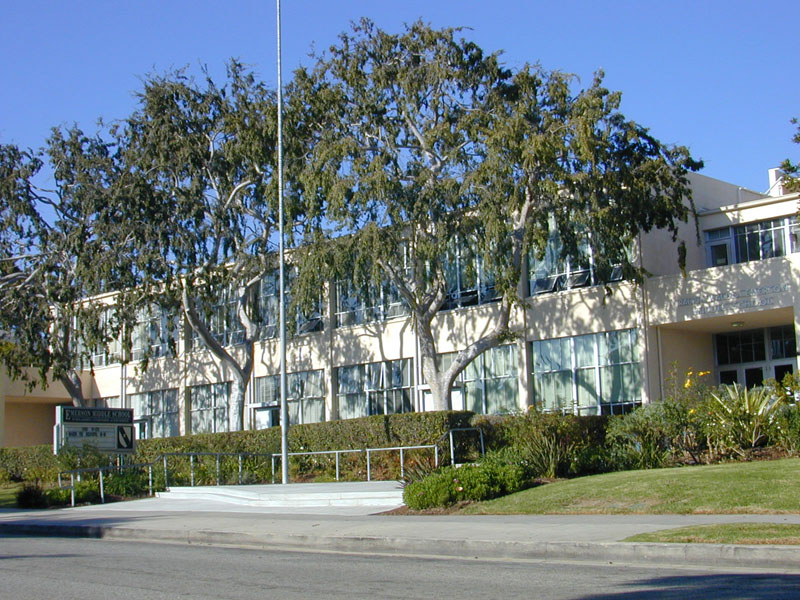
Emerson Middle School

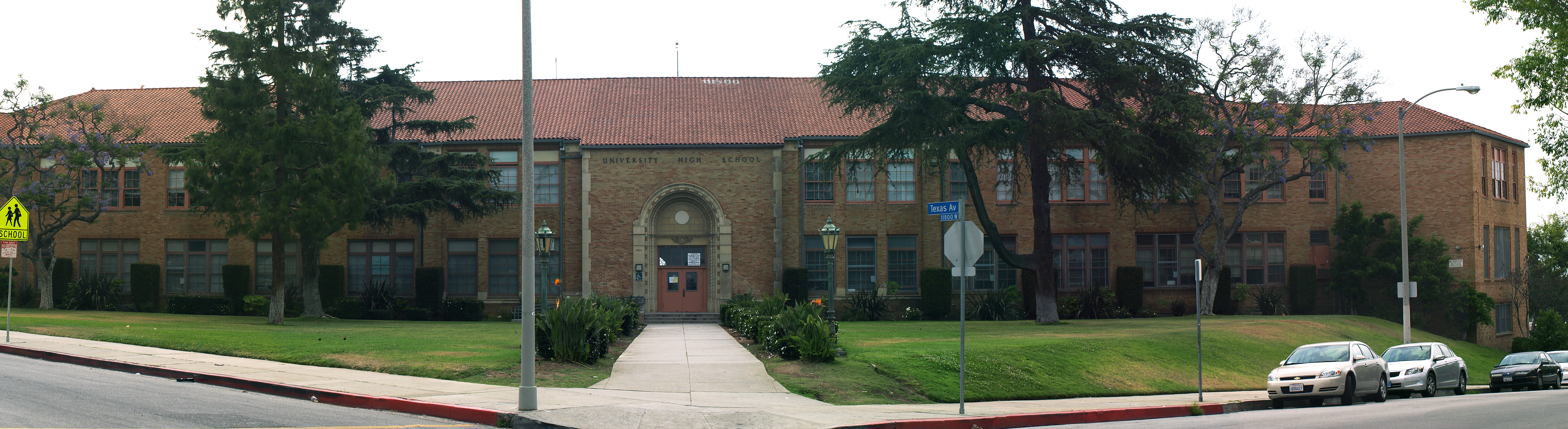
University High School

Beverly Hills Post Office (BHPO) is the name given to a section of Los Angeles, California, that lies within the 90210 ZIP code, assigned to the Beverly Hills Post Office. Los Angeles mailing addresses with the ZIP code 90210 may be written as "Beverly Hills, CA 90210", though the properties themselves lie outside of the Beverly Hills city limits.

== Description ==
Beverly Hills Post Office (BHPO) is a neighborhood in the city of Los Angeles, California. BHPO is adjacent to the city of Beverly Hills, lying north of it in the hills of the Santa Monica Mountains and stretching up to Mulholland Drive. Because the United States Postal Service in Beverly Hills serves this LA neighborhood, residents have a Beverly Hills mailing address with zip code 90210, while other wealthy neighborhoods nearby, like Bel Air and Holmby Hills, have Los Angeles mailing addresses. While the Beverly Hills connotation makes BHPO—about one-third the size of the city—attractive, land is available in larger sizes, and with lower prices, better views, and more seclusion, than in Beverly Hills itself.

The BHPO area itself contains a number of neighborhoods, including Benedict Canyon and Coldwater Canyon.

== History ==
The Los Angeles Times wrote in 2004, "When Beverly Hills was incorporated in 1914, the northern border was roughly one mile (1.6 km) north of Sunset Boulevard, with the exception of Trousdale Estates. The remaining section stretching north to Mulholland Drive was left as part of the hills of Los Angeles, where it remained anonymous for decades". In the 1920s, the federal government decided to have the Beverly Hills post office serve the area now known as BHPO, which was then a rural area, much of it part of Doheny Ranch. By the 1940s people bought BHPO homes because they were less expensive than in Beverly Hills, despite higher property taxes. In 1963, the area was included within the 90210 ZIP Code, which also covers the northern part of Beverly Hills. Property taxes were higher in Los Angeles than in Beverly Hills until 1978 California Proposition 13 equalized property taxes, making BHPO more attractive.

== Post Office ==
The ZIP Code 90210 is still handled by the Beverly Hills Main Post Office. The original Beverly Hills Main Post Office from 1934 to the 1990s still sits at 469 North Crescent Drive in the Beverly Hills Civic Center, and was added to the National Register of Historic Places in 1985. In 1990, 325 North Maple Street was rebuilt as the new Beverly Hills Main Post Office; the old Main on Crescent Drive was closed in 1999 when the building was sold back to the City of Beverly Hills. Beverly Hills has other Post Offices in other ZIP Codes as well.

== City services ==
BHPO residents do not have access to Beverly Hills Police Department, Beverly Hills Fire Department or any Beverly Hills city services. As citizens of the city of Los Angeles, they receive Los Angeles city services and vote in Los Angeles elections. This can cause problems with emergency response. For example, when actress Demi Moore needed an ambulance in January 2012, Beverly Hills and Los Angeles 9-1-1 operators used over two minutes to determine jurisdiction for her home.

=== Education ===
Public education is provided by the Los Angeles Unified School District as opposed to the Beverly Hills Unified School District, which serves students within Beverly Hills city limits.

The western part of the Beverly Hills Post Office area is zoned to Warner Avenue Elementary School, while the eastern portion is zoned to West Hollywood Elementary School.

All residents are zoned to Emerson Middle School and University High School.
