= Susan Barse Miller =

American painter

- Born: c. 1876
- Died: January 11, 1935; Clearwater, Florida, U.S.
- Occupation: Painter
- Spouse: Warren Hastings Miller
- Children: 2 sons (including Barse Miller), 1 daughter

Susan Barse Miller (c. 1876 – January 11, 1935) was an American painter. She was a member of the Laguna Beach Art Association.
