= George Samerjan =

American artist (1915–2005)

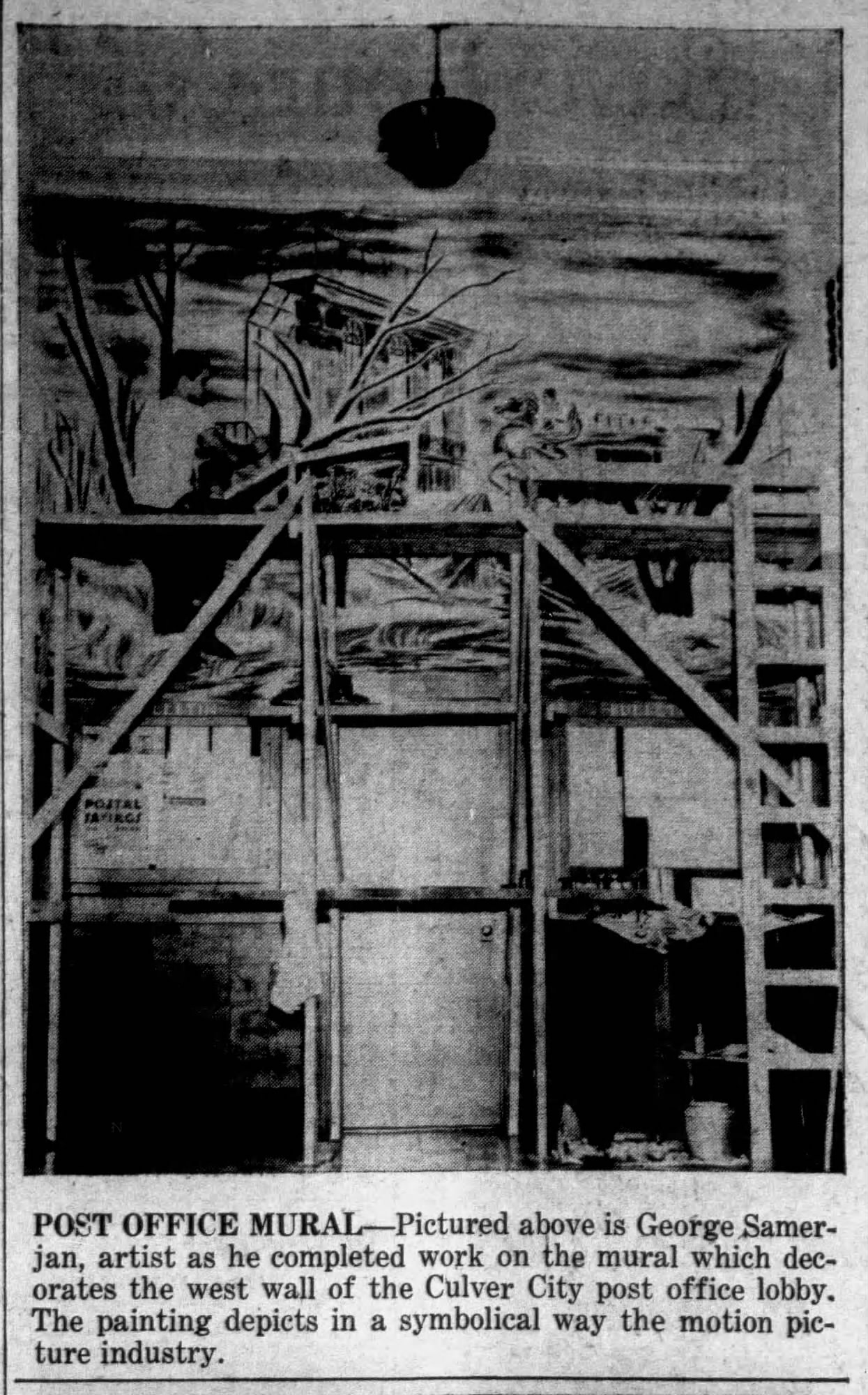
- "Post Office Mural" Evening Vanguard, November 7, 1941
- Born: May 12, 1915; Boston, Massachusetts
- Died: January 1, 2005 (aged 89); Peekskill, New York
- Occupations: Artist, art director

George Eurengy Samerjan (May 12, 1915–January 1, 2005) was a 20th-century American artist and art director.

== Life and career ==
He was born in Boston, Massachusetts, to parents who had emigrated from Aleppo, Ottoman Empire. During the Great Depression, he painted New Deal murals for the post offices in Maywood, Culver City, and Calexico, California. The "somewhat surrealistic" Culver City mural is considered unusual as the Treasury Department mural-project directors generally preferred realism and/or regionalism. He also worked as an art director for the Los Angeles Times, and taught at Otis College and Occidental College. During World War II medical training, he painted a mural at Camp Barkeley, Texas. He worked as an art director for Esquire magazine and Coronet magazine. He taught graphic design at New York University. He designed the Arctic Explorations commemorative stamp in 1959, and an Adlai Stevenson commemorative stamp in 1965. Samerjan died in Peekskill, New York in 2005.
