= Beverly Hills Main Post Office =

Historic building in California, US

Paula Kent Meehan Historic Building
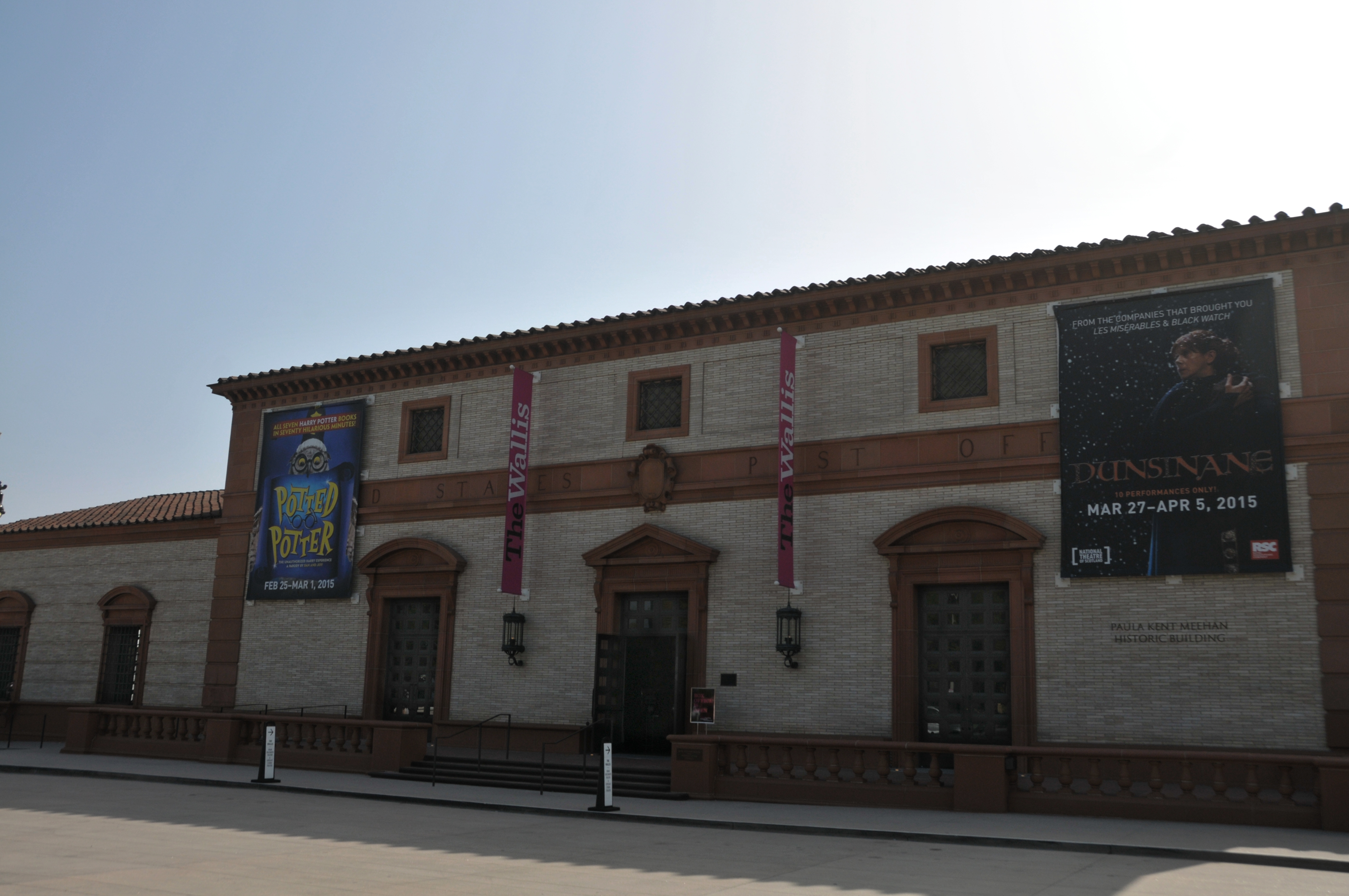
- in 2015, as an arts center
- Former names: Beverly Hills Main Post Office

General information
- Architectural style: Italian Renaissance Revival
- Location: 469 N. Crescent Dr., Beverly Hills, California, USA
- Current tenants: Wallis Annenberg Center for the Performing Arts
- Opened: April 28, 1934
- Cost: $300,000
- Landlord: City of Beverly Hills

Design and construction
- Architects: Ralph C. Frewelling and Allison & Allison
- Engineer: C.A. Sanborn
- Main contractor: Sarver and Zoss
- U.S. Post Office - Beverly Hills Main Post Office
- U.S. National Register of Historic Places
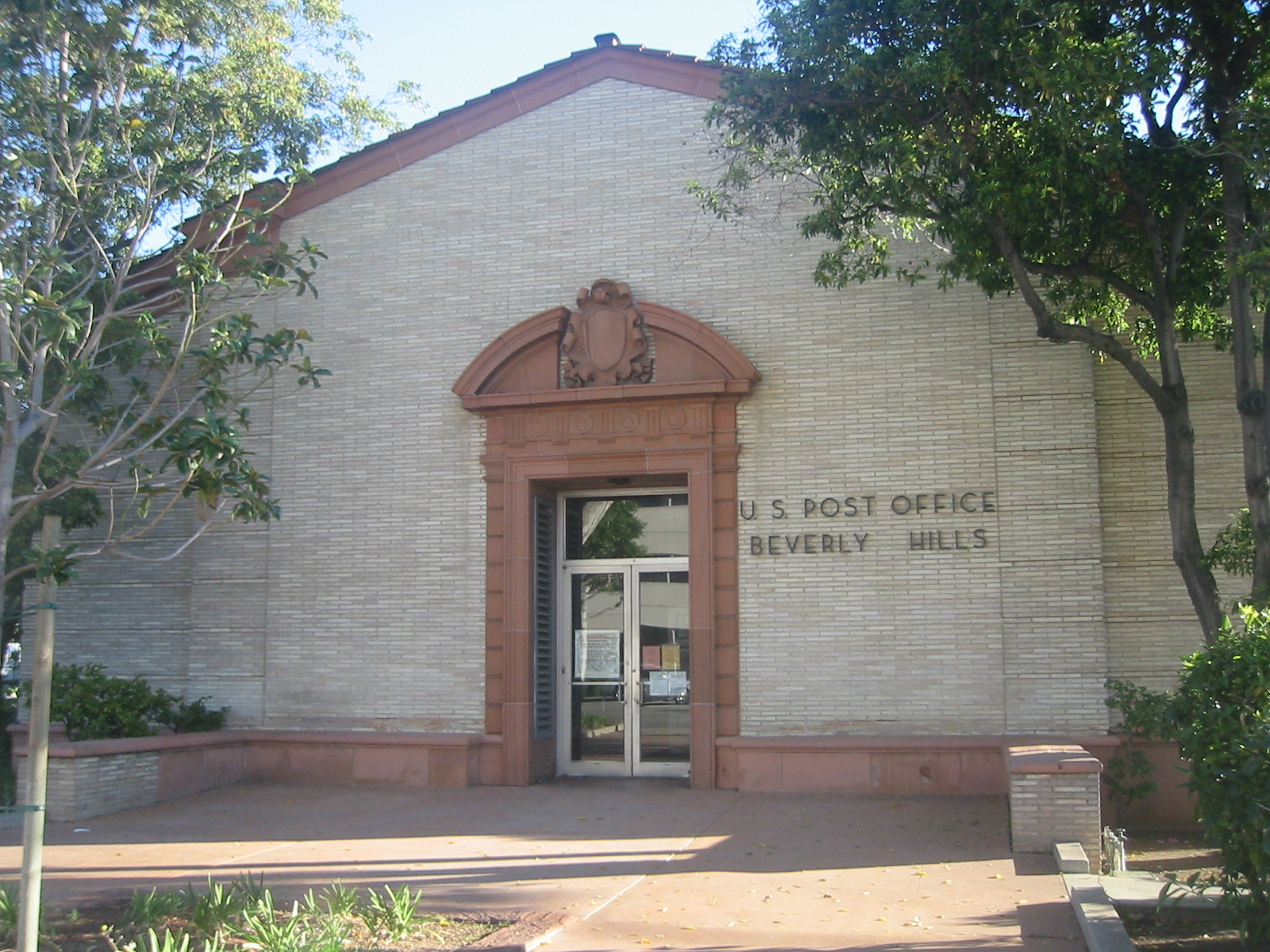
- in 2007, with old sign still intact

- Location within the Los Angeles metropolitan area
- Coordinates: 34°4′21″N 118°23′6″W
- NRHP reference No.: 85000126

The old Beverly Hills Main Post Office is a Renaissance Revival building at the Beverly Hills Civic Center in Beverly Hills, California. The building has carried the addresses 469 North Crescent Drive and 470 North Canon Drive. It was built as the main post office in the 1930s, remaining a post office until the 1990s, and in the 2010s became the Paula Kent Meehan Historic Building of the Wallis Annenberg Center for the Performing Arts.

== History ==
The post office was part of the planning for the Beverly Hills Civic Center in the 1930s, and the City of Beverly Hills bought the property from the Pacific Electric Railway Company in 1930 in preparation for the Civic Center; the property had been the railway's Beverly Hills station. The post office was designed in an Italian Renaissance Revival style by architect Ralph C. Frewelling of Beverly Hills with Allison & Allison as consultants. Built as a WPA project, with Sarver and Zoss of Los Angeles as contractors, the post office opened on April 28, 1934.

Even though the building was designed with the formal entrance facing north along Santa Monica Boulevard, the railway still owned tracks along the north and south, so the public mainly used the east and west entrances on Crescent Drive and Canon Drive.

In 1960, letter carriers were moved to the Post Office Annex at 325 North Maple Drive, but post office boxes and window service remained.

The Main Post Office on Crescent Drive was added to the National Register of Historic Places in 1985.

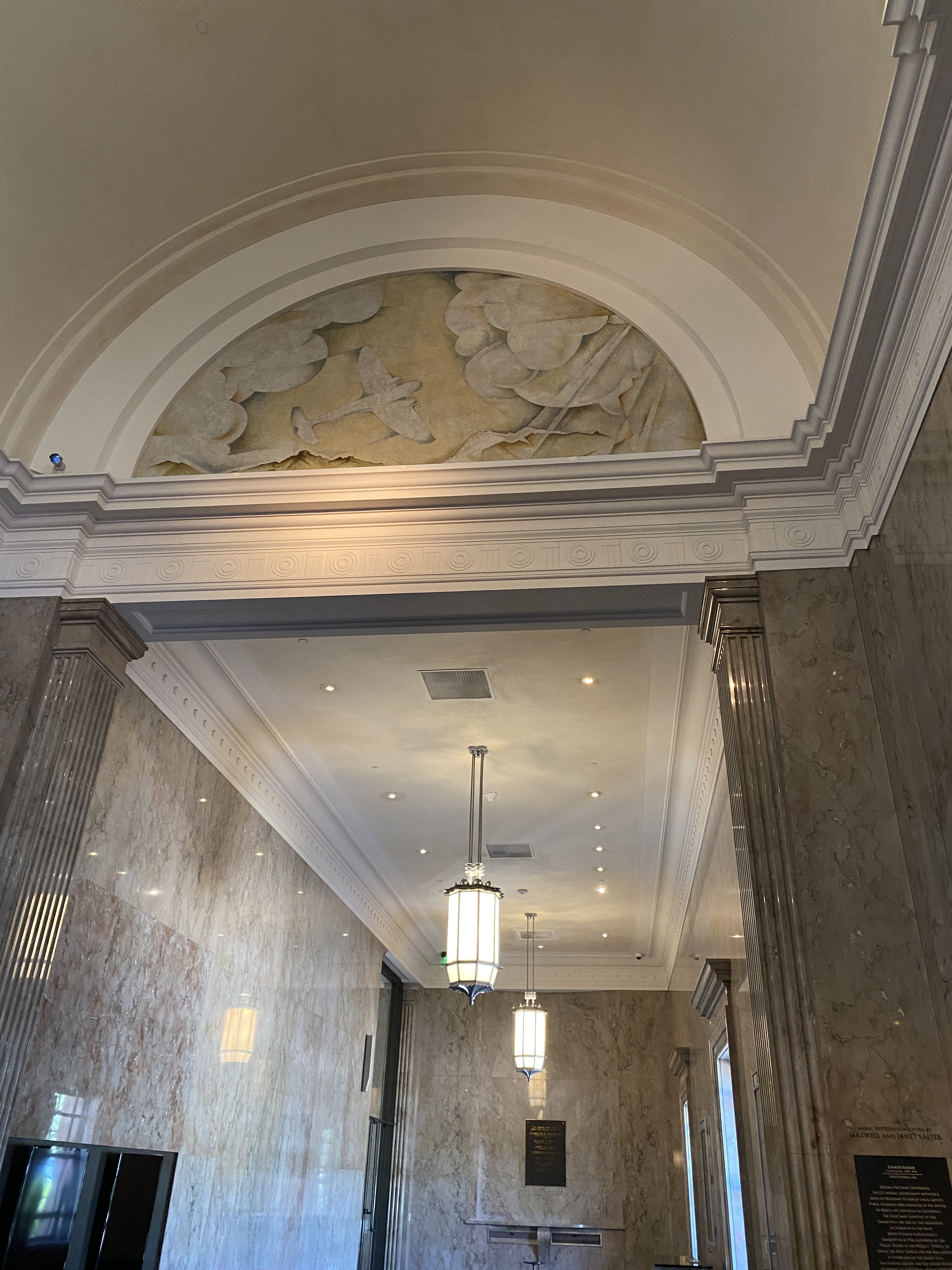
Airmail mural by Charles Kassler

In 1990, 325 North Maple Drive was rebuilt as the new Beverly Hills Main Post Office, and most services moved out of the old Main on Crescent Drive. In March 1999, the old Main Post Office was closed and its post office boxes moved to Maple Drive. The old Post Office was sold back to the City of Beverly Hills in 1999. The City signed a long-term lease to the Wallis Annenberg Center for the Performing Arts, who named the building the Paula Kent Meehan Historic Building.

== Gallery ==
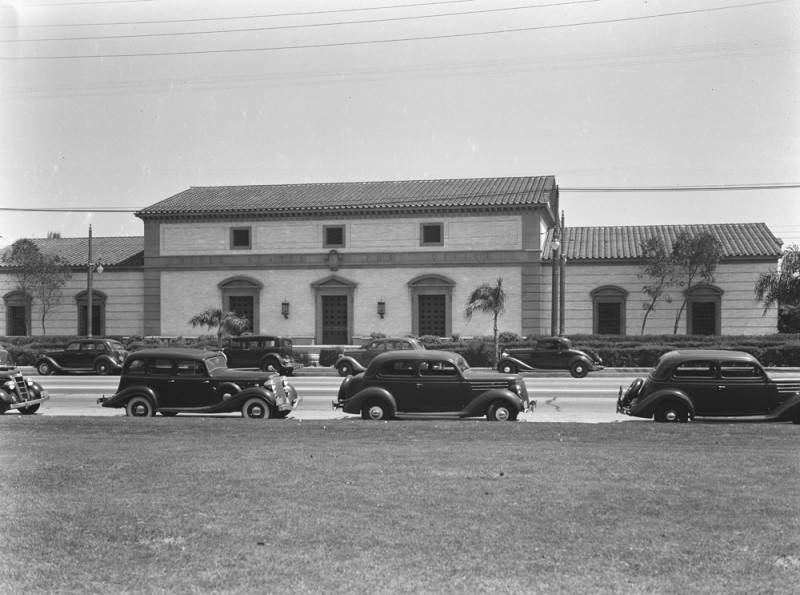
Beverly Hills Post Office (WPA photo, May 17, 1939)

== See also ==
- Beverly Hills Civic Center, of which the building is a part
- Beverly Hills Post Office, a section of Los Angeles city in this post office's area
- Wallis Annenberg Center for the Performing Arts, of which the building is now also a part
- List of United States post offices
- List of United States post office murals in California
