= Ray Boynton =

American painter (1883–1951)

Ray S. Boynton
- Born: January 14, 1883; Whitten, Iowa
- Died: 1951; Albuquerque, New Mexico
- Education: Chicago Academy of Fine Arts
- Notable work: Coit Tower mural
- Style: Fresco and Encaustic
- Movement: Social realism
- Spouse: Margaret Gough (m. 1919; died 1930)

Ray Boynton (14 January 1883 – 1951) also known as Raymond Boynton, was an American artist and arts educator, most famous for his mural work in California during the Great Depression earning commissions under the Public Works of Art Project (PWAP) and the Treasury Relief Art Project (TRAP).

He worked at Coit Tower painting murals with Ralph Stackpole, Bernard Zakheim, and Edith Hamlin (wife of Maynard Dixon). He also painted nine murals in the Modesto Post Office which was decommissioned and sold at auction in 2011. In addition to creating public commissions, Boynton was a teacher at several post-secondary institutions.

== Biography ==
=== Early life ===
Raymond Scepter Boynton was born in Whitten, Iowa, on January 14, 1883. After graduating from high school at Strawberry Point, Iowa, in 1901 he moved to Chicago in 1903 to attend the Chicago Academy of Fine Arts (now known as School of the Art Institute of Chicago) from 1905 to 1907. While there, he worked as an usher at the Iroquois Theatre and was present when it caught fire on December 30, 1903, escaping with minor burns. It is the deadliest theatre fire in American history. Upon completion of his studies at the academy, he moved to Eastern Washington state because a brother lived there; Boynton resided there for seven years. He described art culture in Eastern Washington as "lacking". He was able to keep art in his life by giving private lessons in Spokane, Washington; he was hired to paint curtains for a high school theatre; and, eventually, he garnered a commission to paint the Spokane Falls on a mural to be placed in City Hall's first council chamber (about 1913). Unfortunately, during renovations of City Hall, it was ruined when workers nailed boards over it; the mural was forgotten and was later rediscovered in the 1960s. Although efforts were made to raise funds to restore it, the mural was eventually sold and is now in private hands (according to emails with Spokane's Museum of Art and Culture - known as the MAC). During these seven years in Eastern Washington, Boynton perhaps spent more time farming than in artistic endeavors. Finally, luck broke his way around 1914 when he became a judge for the Northwest region of art that was to be sent to San Francisco for the 1915 World's Fair called the Panama–Pacific International Exposition (PPIE). He first went to Seattle to judge the artwork (he also got some of his work into PPIE), and then he continued on to San Francisco where he would take up permanent residence for many years.

=== California 1915 to 1939 ===
The 25-year stretch from 1915 to 1940 is perhaps the most important artistic period of Ray Boynton's life. He moved to San Francisco in 1915, when hundreds upon hundreds of works of art were located at the Panama–Pacific International Exposition (PPIE). A biographer later stated:

To be thrown into sudden contact with thousands of paintings, after so long an isolation, was like surrounding a starving man with food. He responded readily to the broader field of activities that San Francisco offered and his artistic growth became rapid and steady.

He began broadening his artistic abilities by learning pastel and fresco. His art, exhibited in the PPIE, helped him to create connections that would serve him well. After PPIE left town, and many of the makeshift buildings were torn down, the social elite of San Francisco began looking for artists to "beautify" the city with large murals and mosaics. Boynton, along with Maynard Dixon, stepped forward. Although he had meager experience with murals from his time in Spokane, he decided to seize the moment. His first project appeared in a Los Altos home in 1917.

Having previous teaching experience in Spokane, being shown in PPIE, and having done two large works in Spokane no doubt helped his résumé. He got a job at the California School of Fine Arts in 1920, and in 1923 he was employed by the Department of Art of the University of California at Berkeley where he remained until he retired in 1948. Lee remarks that Boynton was given the job at CFSA because it was a small school and because Boynton had seen great works of art in museums and exhibitions - not just in books. Mary Fabilli, a former art student of Boynton, who helped put together a posthumous exhibition of his work in 1976, provided another possible reason for his hiring besides being well traveled. She wrote:

His ability to speak, to write, his versatility, variety of work experience and affable personality endeared him to journalists and to the general public. There was nothing dandified or effete about him, and the shaggy crop of hair and woolen tweeds [he wore] carried conviction of rough hewn 100% American masculinity.

Once on these faculties he began writing for local papers and magazines. He was a critic, a theorist, and editorialist. His writing served him well, as Fabilli notes: "His contact with the newspaper business stood him in good stead, for in later years there was no difficulty about getting a sympathetic hearing from the press, and he was often consulted when other artists or teachers might be avoided or ignored.". He showed his work in numerous exhibits. Boynton, (Ralph Stackpole, Bernard Zakheim, Victor Arnautoff), among others, went to Mexico to study with Diego Rivera. During this period he sought and procured many commissions both public and private. It could be said luck fell his way because he had a knack for being in the right place at the right time. Anthony W. Lee writes about Boynton:

...a number of younger painters vied for leadership. Two of them - Ray Boynton and Maynard Dixon - were able to attach themselves to a specific group of patrons...Dixon and Boynton, who had played absolutely no role in 1915, gained an advantage by recognizing the new social and political requirements and mapping their artistic interests onto them."

In addition, San Francisco, from the end of World War I to the beginning of World War II, had many left-leaning artists. It also had union riots and demonstrations - supposedly in support of Communist ideals. Boynton, although sympathetic, was far enough removed so that his name was untarnished and he brought stability to the art scene when supporters of the artists began to grow tired of extremism by the mid-to-late 1930s. Boynton's fortunes varied through 1920s. He married Margaret (peggy) Gough, a Canadian, in San Francisco in 1919 who died of tuberculosis in 1930. During her illness. Boynton sacrificed many painting hours to provide his semi-invalid wife with care. In the mid-1920s he went to Mexico to study with Diego Rivera. Boynton accepted this invitation because, as Anthony W. Lee writes in his extensive book on Diego Rivera in San Francisco - Painting on the Left:

...Boynton understood that, despite the mastery with which he was credited at CSFA [California School of Fine Arts], he required instruction from a more accomplished mural painter. On his arrival in Mexico he found Rivera at work on his massive Communist-inspired series at the Ministry of Education and the grand monumental panels at Chapingo."

Having first-hand instruction from Rivera seemed to help Boynton earn another commission - the murals at Mills College - but did little to temper the criticism he received for his final product. Although in an interview he is noted as saying, "...a commission which he feels is his most important work," Anthony W. Lee writes that opinions of others, at the time, were not equal to Boynton's. Barbaric and failure stand out as prime examples over five pages of Lee's writing on these murals.

=== California 1930s ===
Both Boynton and Dixon were left off a major mural project in 1929 that came under public scrutiny - which agitated Dixon highly. Rivera was to paint a mural in the California School of Fine Arts. After intense mudslinging by journalists, editorial writers, and competing groups of artists, the location was changed to a private lunch club at the Stock Exchange. One editorial proclaimed low level/less experienced artists as being equal to those who rubbed elbows with Rivera in grandiose terms. Allegations about Rivera were common on the subjects of Communism and being an immigrant. Both artists would learn from this experience, and Boynton would be able to be seen as a moderate later in the 1930s.

Early in the 1930s Boynton began venturing out to gold mining ghost towns of California and Nevada. These ghost towns were drawing people who were down on their luck and thought they could eke out a living finding left over gold flakes. Many of his drawings focus on Downieville. The drawings Boynton subsequently created were later exhibited a couple of times at UC Berkeley and Mills College. Although well received, one entry into a judged competition was rejected. It was viewed as too conservative compared to more "modern" pieces of art: avant-garde or abstract. This rejection corresponds with the shift of power away from Boynton and Maynard Dixon that is pointed out by Anthony W. Lee as well. In the mural works sphere of art, Bernard Zakheim and Victor Arnautoff had replaced Boynton and Dixon. Lee states this change was set in stone by June 1931. It is interesting that these two artists would ascend for the very reasons that had been charged against Diego Rivera only a couple years before. Zakheim, a Jewish immigrant from Eastern Europe, and Arnautoff, an immigrant from Russia, were both openly supportive of socialism/communism, or far left politics. During this time Boynton married his second wife (whom he later divorced).

The rise of Zakheim in San Francisco coincided with the Coit Tower murals. He and Ralph Stackpole were influential in obtaining the Federal commission. Numerous artists participated, many of whom had previously worked with Diego Rivera. Most of the murals have historical reflections, but they do not seem to tell a chronological story. He was known as the “Dean of Frescoes” at Coit Tower. Suspicions arose from journalists and others that the paintings would take on a political stance "left of center," and soon small battles were emerging in public about the direction that should be taken; the suspicions were not unfounded. These artists, led by Zakheim, had formed an Artists' and Writers' Union only a year before, and it included artists who were not that extreme - Stackpole and Boynton amongst others. During this time strikes broke out along the piers which the artists could view from their perch atop the city. Some painters tried to incorporate this into their murals. The "left" leaning artists supported the strikes, but their support was perhaps minimal compared to the ruckus that was taking place with the longshoremen. However, public art is always inflammatory. Lee writes, "By June, Fleishhacker was leading a movement to destroy the murals, finding the work of some painters wholly unacceptable and, as we will observe, dangerous. The contentious Zakheim came under intense fire, and his mural, along with several others, was slated for whitewashing." To kill the fire, some influential patrons began lifting up the previous decades' art leaders - Boynton (with substantial mural experience) was chosen as the new "spiritual leader," as Lee says. "To the surprise of Zakheim, who proposed the mural program, and Arnautoff, who directed the daily work, Boynton was named high priest... [The Coit Tower murals] were given a lineage, traced back to the post-PPIE productions and the Dixon-Boynton debates, not to Rivera."

In 1936 Boynton was commissioned as the lead artist to paint thirteen murals in the Modesto, California Post Office known as El Veijo. The post office originally contained a series of thirteen tempera lunette-shaped depicting agricultural scenes in the Central Valley. Six are now missing; seven remain in the post office.

In 1938 Boynton was elected to the Board of Directors of the San Francisco Art Association (SFAA) and, serving in that capacity, was influential in shaping the educational program of the California School of Fine Arts, conducted by the Art Association.

=== Post–World War II ===
Little is written about Ray Boynton after 1940. It is known he continued to work at UC Berkeley until June 1948. Once he retired, he and his third wife - Beryl Wynnyk Boynton - moved to Santa Fe, New Mexico. The last years of his life were spent in trekking through unfrequented areas of Mexico, New Mexico, and Arizona, accompanied by his artist wife, Beryl. The Boynton studio in Santa Fe, which he remodeled from an ancient adobe dwelling, was the center of these explorations. It has become one of the landmarks for artists and writers of the Southwest. Ray Boynton died from cancer September 26, 1951 in Albuquerque, New Mexico. He had no children.

=== Legacy ===
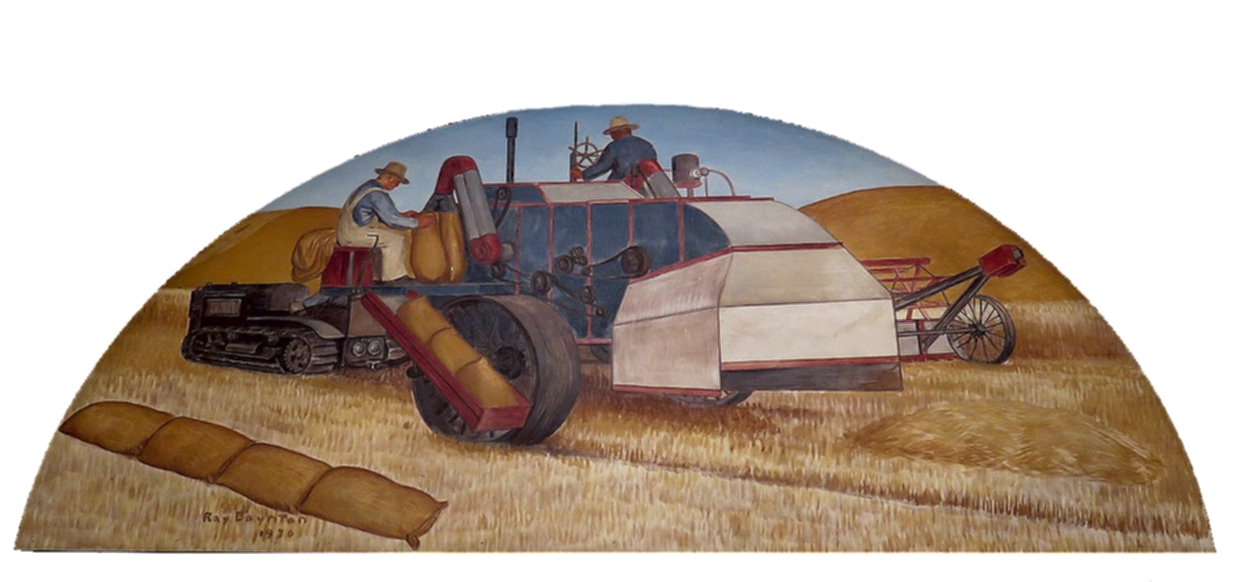
Grain Harvesting (1936), one of the surviving murals at the post office in Modesto, California

After his death in 1951, the life and work of Ray Boynton continued to be studied. In 1976, during the 25th anniversary of Boynton's death, The Oakland Museum, with help from Mary Fabilli, put on an exhibition entitled Ray Boynton and the Mother Lode: The Depression Years. The museum guild purchased a large collection of Boynton's drawings and paired them with accounts from those men and women who came to look for gold during the Great Depression. A catalog - carrying the exhibition's name - with a biography and accounts from the miners was also produced.

All the public works of the 1930s, and the buildings they were attached to (in various art mediums), eventually began to age and become out-dated. In time buildings began to be remodeled. Barbara Bernstein, working for the New Deal Art Registry, said in an interview: "A lot of art was lost through sheer ignorance because many people didn't think it was worth saving." This is what occurred with the Modesto downtown post office. Remodeled in the 1960s, several of Ray Boynton's murals were removed. The job's contractor asked if any of the workers would like to buy them - otherwise they would be scrapped. One worker bought them but had no place to display them; they were stored in a shed for the next 40-plus years. After reading about the renovation of the post office and of the missing murals, a local Modesto man thought he had seen the artwork at a family member's house. This proved to be the case and the family donated them to the city. Bernstein further explained:

Ray Boynton is a significant figure in California art history... The murals in the Modesto post office are very fine examples of what the Treasury Section of Fine Arts set out to do: not just provide jobs for artists, but bring original and accessible art to cities and towns of all sizes. They put these murals in public places where people went as part of their daily life (rather than in places that were) formal or intimidating like a museum.

The Post Office was eventually sold to private investors, and in December 2013 it was announced that the building would become a law office.

It is believed that Boynton produced the first paintings in true fresco and encaustic painting in the San Francisco area. Examples of mural paintings done by him in these media are to be seen at Mills College, in the Faculty Club at Berkeley, and at the California School of Fine Arts. His paintings in oil, tempera, and pastel are in the permanent collections of The California Palace of the Legion of Honor, Mills College Art Gallery, the M. H. De Young Museum, and elsewhere.

== Commentary on mural painting ==
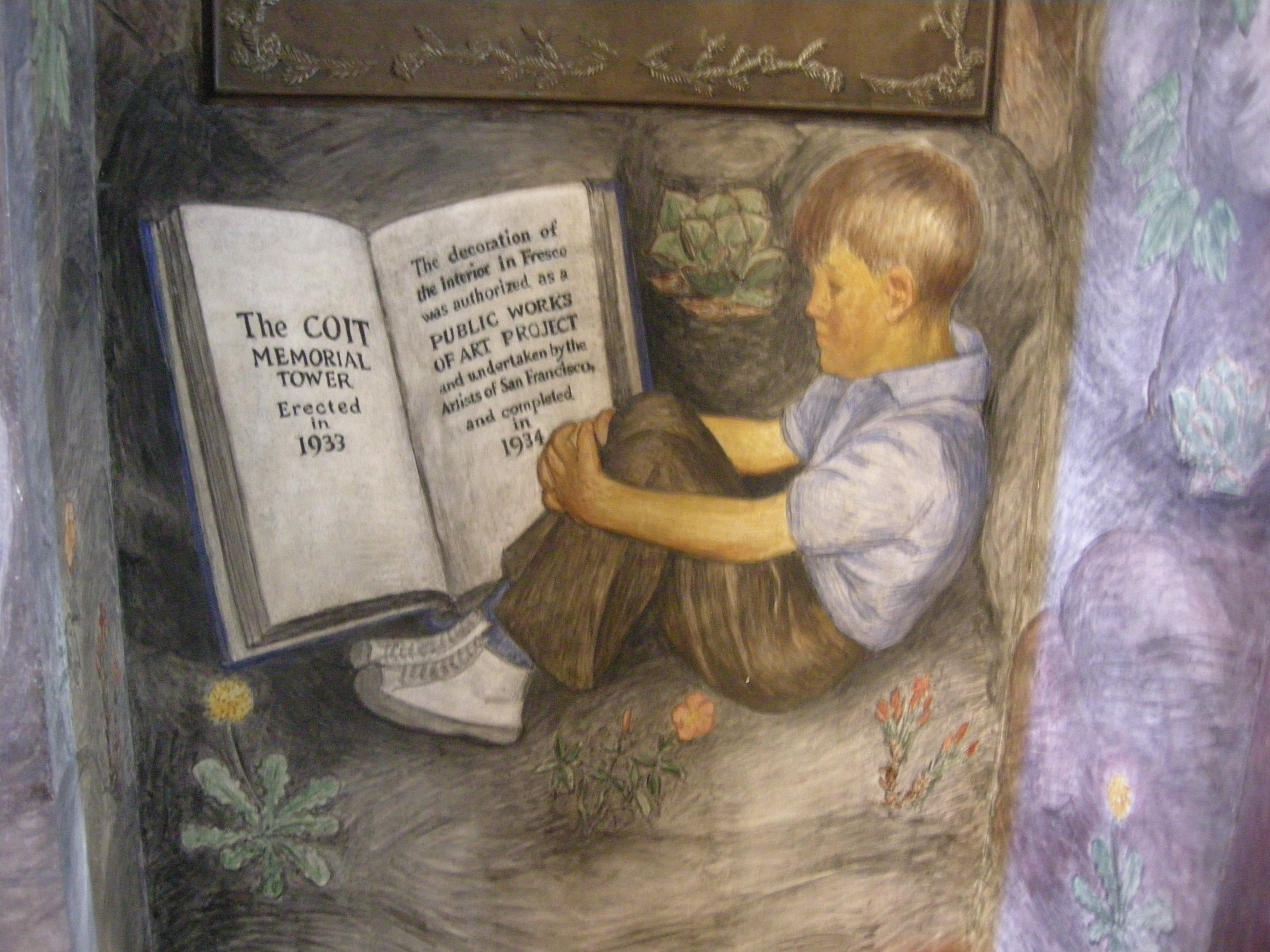
Detail from Ray Boynton's Coit Tower fresco Animal Force and Machine Force, crediting the Public Works of Art Project

"Mural painting, as it has been carried on for a long time and as it is practiced generally today, has ceased to have any vital relation to the wall or to architecture in general, largely, I think, because so little of it is done on the wall. Being done always in the seclusion of the studio, it has lost the intuition of the wall and its discipline of scale and color. This discipline of the wall creating in place and within the proper limitations of materials and method is perhaps the most vital single factor in great mural design. Without these real limitations it has become simply the large easel picture pasted on the wall, generally a bit stilted and mannered and self-conscious, or else with limitations imposed on it that are so arbitrary and foreign that they are meaningless. The shallow worship of sunlight in landscape, the doctrinaire ideas of ‘true’ color that deny the validity of the earth colors with their somber magnificence of reds and browns, the banal tricks of oil painting, have left us stammering before the wall, repeating shopworn theatrical commonplaces, making empty gestures for design, helpless with gold, not knowing the difference between enrichment and display, without even the language of a design that has monumental dignity of the authority of true decoration. If any true monumental style is ever evolved in this country it will have to be evolved on the wall, as it has been in every other instance."

== Works ==
Year	Notable Work and Exhibitions	Location
1904	Exhibition - Chicago Society of Artists	Chicago, Illinois
c. 1913	Mural of Spokane Falls	City Council, Spokane, Washington
1915	Young Diana, Vanity, Eve, A boy, Spokane Valley (5 paintings)	Panama–Pacific International Exposition (PPIE), San Francisco, California
1916	Exhibition - Hill Tolerton Gallery	San Francisco, California
1917	Palace of Fine Arts	San Francisco, California
1919	De Young Museum	San Francisco, California
1919 – 1920	Canon Kip Memorial Chapel	San Francisco, California
1920 – 1923	St. John of Nepomuk (mural oil painting)	Bohemian Club, San Francisco, California
19??	Mosaic in the home of Charles Erskine Scott Wood	Los Gatos, California
1928	Mills College Murals (music hall)	Oakland, California
c. 1932	Mother Lode Sketches	Mining Ghost Towns of California and Nevada
1933 – 1934	Animal Force and Machine Force, Coit Tower mural	San Francisco, California
1935	Girl Eating Grapes (tempera painting, awarded the Anne Bremer Memorial Prize)	San Francisco, California
1936	Agricultural Products of the Valley (a series of tempera lunette murals, restored in 2010)	Modesto Post Office Murals, Modesto, California
1976	The Mother Lode and the Depression Years (a museum exhibition of mining-related artwork)	Oakland Museum, Oakland, California

=== Bibliography ===
- Ray Boynton and the Mother Lode: The Depression Years (Exhibition Catalog, from May 4 through August 15, 1976), Fabilli, Mary, The Oakland Museum (1976), Oakland, California.
- Poems from the Ranges, Wood, Charles Erskine Scott (with woodcut illustration by Ray Boynton), The Lantern Press, (1929), San Francisco, California

== See also ==
- Federal Art Project (FAP)
