= El Centro Main Post Office =

United States historic post office

- U.S. Post Office-El Centro Main
- U.S. National Register of Historic Places
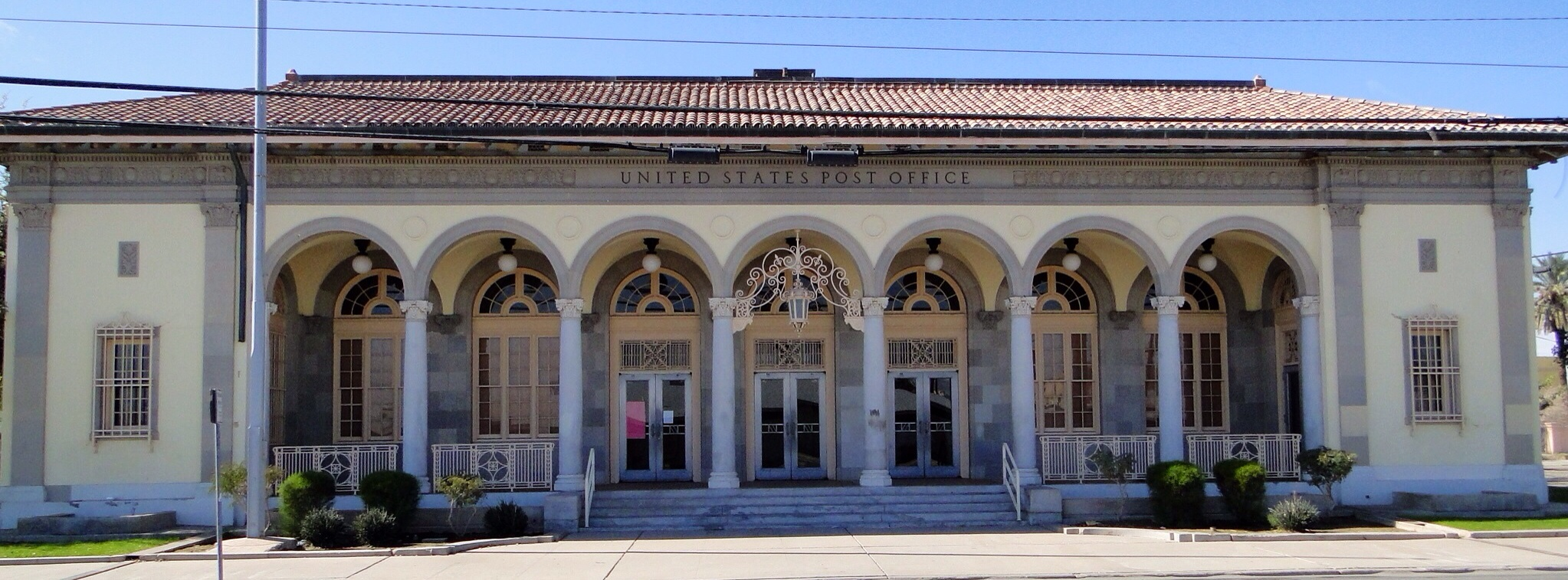

- Location within California
- Location: 230 S. 5th St., El Centro, California
- Coordinates: 32°47′27″N 115°33′14″W
- Area: 0.5 acres (0.20 ha)
- Built: 1931-32
- Architect: James A. Wetmore, Louis A. Simon
- Architectural style: Classical Revival, Beaux Arts
- MPS: US Post Office in California 1900-1941 TR
- NRHP reference No.: 85000125
- Added to NRHP: January 11, 1985

The El Centro Main Post Office, in El Centro, California, was built in 1931. It was listed on the National Register of Historic Places in 1985 as U.S. Post Office-El Centro Main.

It is Beaux Arts in style, with a large loggia across the front which is common to Italianate or Second Renaissance Revival style. It has classical Corinthian columns. Design is credited to James A. Wetmore and Louis A. Simon of the Office of the Supervising Architect.

Its National Register nomination discusses its architecture:

The El Centro Main Office is anomalous, both in terms of its size, its style, and in the use of expensive materials. Stylistically, the El Centro Post Office is essentially Beaux Arts Classicism, though by 1932, this style was at least 15 years out of date. It is unique among 1930s post offices for its unusual style alone; the other Beaux-Arts buildings from the early thirties also housed federal courts or other federal agencies, and were designed by private architects. By 1932, the Office of the Supervising Architect was developing the Starved Classical style, and the most common style used for small post offices in California was some form of Mediterranean Revival. In any event, the post office is the most sophisticated Beaux-Arts building in town, and acts as a major urban design focus for the town's architecture and public spaces: On the state level, the building is important as a stylistically anachronistic example of the small post office building type.
