= Gordon K. Grant =

American artist (1908–1940)

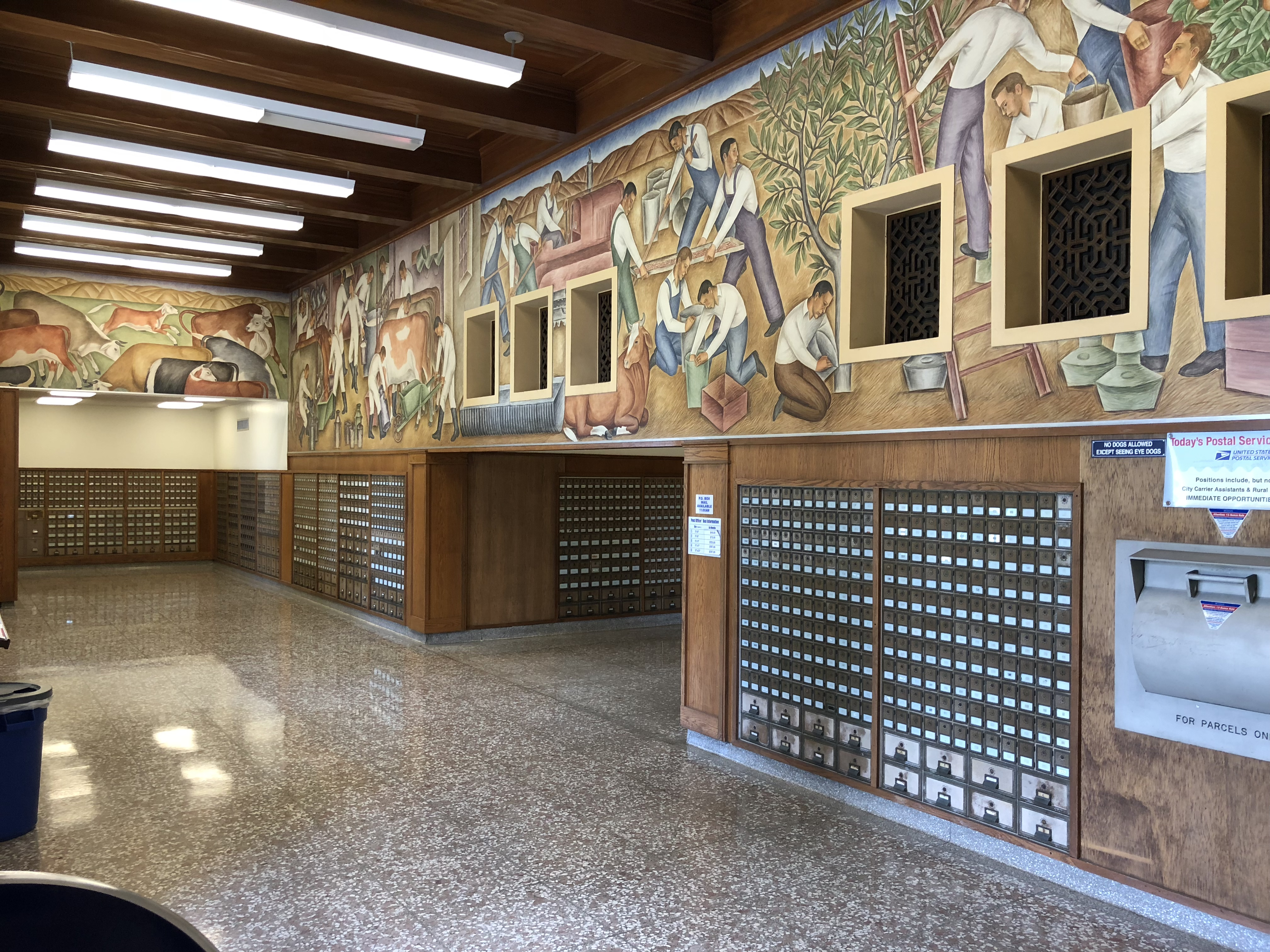
Agriculture and Industries of Ventura

Gordon Kenneth Grant (January 21, 1908 – March 1, 1940) was an American artist. He is best remembered today for his New Deal murals commissioned for the post offices in Brady, Texas, Alhambra, California and Ventura, California.

== Life and death ==
Born in Oakland, Grant was a graduate of Stanford University. He was a nephew of maritime artist Gordon Grant. His brother Campbell Grant worked for Walt Disney. In the 1930s he worked on murals at Wellesley College and at the Bronx city hall. In 1936 he exhibited paintings in Washington, D.C. on "Indian subjects" including an image of a Hopi eagle dance.

He died in 1940 in a cannon explosion on the Montecito, California estate of George F. Steedman, supposedly accidentally ignited by Grant's lit cigarette. He was working for Steedman as a silversmith. In addition to painting and silversmithing, Gordon was considered an expert on the artwork of Native American tribes of southwestern North America.

The Santa Barbara Museum of Art hosted a retrospective exhibit of his work in 2001.
