= Helen Katharine Forbes =

American painter (1891–1945)

- Forbes (June 1938), painting the Mother's Building mural at Fleishhacker Zoo
- Born: February 3, 1891; San Francisco, California, U.S.
- Died: May 27, 1945 (aged 54); San Francisco, California, U.S.
- Education: Mark Hopkins Art Institute
- Style: WPA-era painting and murals

Helen Katharine Forbes (February 3, 1891 – May 27, 1945) was a Californian artist and arts educator specializing in etching, murals and painting. She is best known for western landscapes, portrait paintings, and her murals with the Treasury Section of Fine Arts and Work Progress Administration (WPA). Forbes was skilled in painting in oil, watercolor, and egg tempera. She painted landscapes of Mexico, Mono Lake and the Sierras in the 1920s, desert scenes of Death Valley in the 1930s, and portraits and still-lifes.

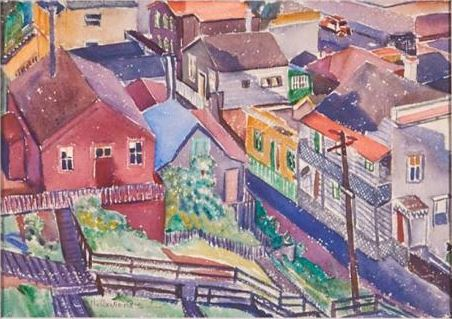
Hillside, North Beach, (c. before 1945), watercolor on paper

== Early life ==
Helen Katharine Forbes was born February 3, 1891, in San Francisco, California, to Stanley Forbes and Kate Skells. At age 12, she moved to Palo Alto, California, with her family and attended Castilleja School for Girls, from which she graduated in 1908. Her grandfather was Andrew Bell Forbes, a California pioneer that arrived to the state with the Argonauts in the 1849 California Gold Rush.

She attended Mark Hopkins Art Institute, where she studied with Frank Joseph Van Sloun. She studied with artist, Armin Hansen in the Carmel area. Later traveling to Europe to study with André Lhote, Ernst Leyden and Hermann Groeber and to attend Academy of Fine Arts, Munich (also known as the Akademic der Bildenden Künste, München) from 1921 until 1925.

== Work ==
Forbes lived and worked throughout Europe and the United States, she traveled often but home was always California. From 1925 until 1926 she travelled to the mining town of Guanajuato City, Mexico for artistic inspiration. From 1930 until 1932 Forbes traveled for short periods of time to Death Valley, in order to finding inspiration for her scenes of the West. She also traveled to Virginia City, Nevada, and painted landscapes and scenery. Her painting, Piute Indian was purchased by Mills College. In 1931 she taught in the Art Department of the University of California, Berkeley.

=== New Deal art ===
In 1939, Forbes worked with artist, Dorothy Wagner Puccinelli to paint the interior four panel murals of the Mother's Building at the San Francisco Zoo. The four murals depict a Noah's Ark-theme with animals and were funded by Federal Art Project (FAP) and Works Progress Administration (WPA). From 1978 until 2002 the Mother's Building served as a gift shop for the zoo, the mural is now in need of restoration and the room is only used for special events.

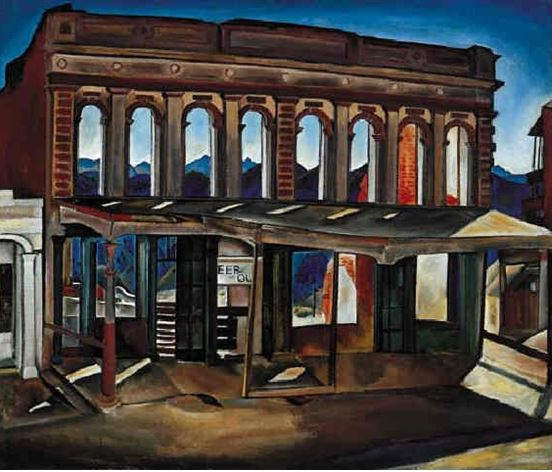
Wells-Fargo Ruins (c. before 1945), oil on canvas

Forbes completed a mural at the Susanville, California, post office in 1939 depicting deer. The mural was funded by the Treasury Section of Fine Arts.

She was commissioned to paint two murals at Monrovia Public Library in Monrovia, California, which was completed in 1940. The mural depicts a grizzly bear and four cubs, painted in egg tempera. The murals hung in the lobby of the post office from 1945 until 1964, then during a remodeling project were taken down. After being stored in the basement of the building, an effort was made to find the mural and eventually restore the one mural that was found. The restoration was completed and the one mural was re-hung in the same post office by 2009. The second mural, depicting the mother grizzly bear is still missing.

== Exhibitions ==
This is a list of select exhibitions, in descending order by date.

- 1915, De Young Memorial Museum, San Francisco
- 1916, De Young Memorial Museum, San Francisco
- 1925, Galerie Beaux Arts, San Francisco
- 1932, Los Angeles Museum of Fine Arts
- 1936, San Francisco Museum of Art

== Death and legacy ==
Forbes was a member of the following organizations; National Society of Mural Painters; California Society of Etchers; San Francisco Art Association; Palo Alto Art Club; San Francisco Mural Society. Forbes was president (and co-founder) of the San Francisco Society of Women Artists from 1928 to 1930.

Helen Katharine Forbes died at age 54 in San Francisco, California on May 27, 1945.

In 1931, the California Palace of the Legion of Honor held an artist retrospective for Forbes.

== See also ==
- List of United States post office murals
