= Norman S. Chamberlain =

American painter

- Born: 1887; Fennville, Michigan, U.S.
- Died: 1961 (aged 73–74); Orange, California, U.S.
- Occupation: Painter

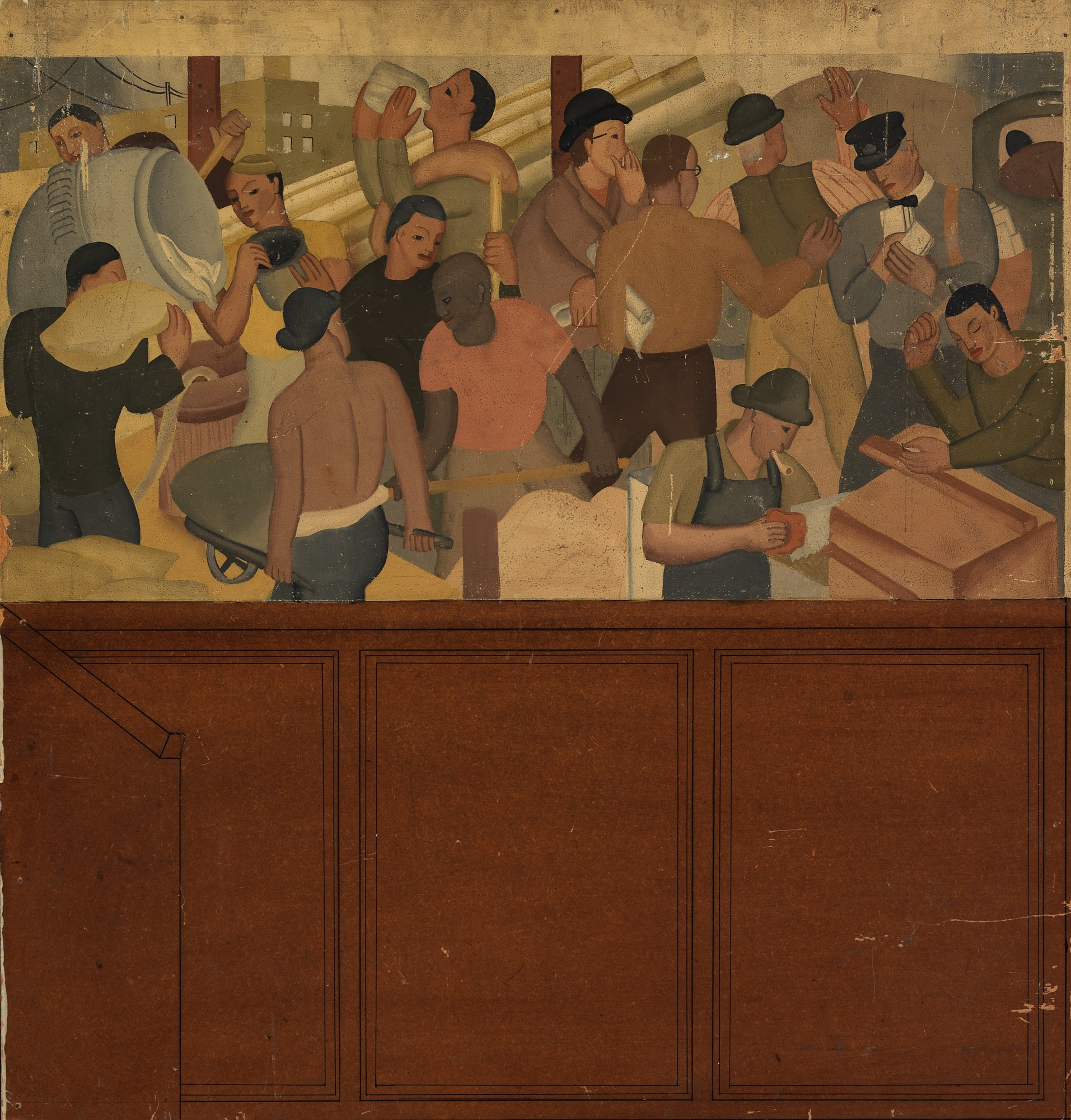
Study for Chamberlain's post office mural at Huntington Beach, California (1936)

Norman S. Chamberlain (1887-1961) was an American painter. Two of his paintings are at the Smithsonian American Art Museum.
