= United States Post Office (Burbank, California) =

Post office in Burbank, California

Coordinates: 34.1805°N 118.3097°W

- U.S. National Register of Historic Places
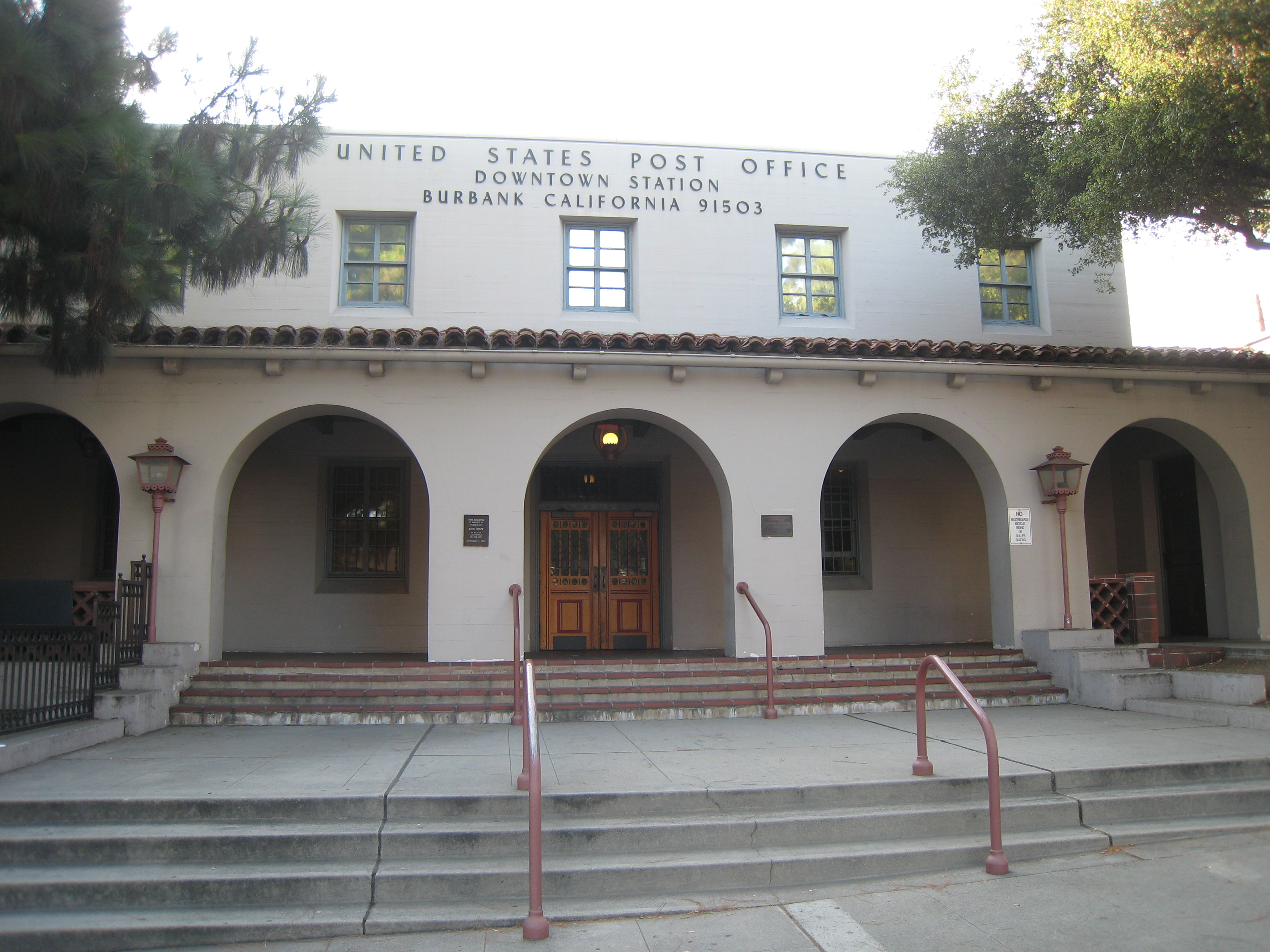
- Location: 135 E. Olive Ave. Burbank, California 91502
- Built: 1937
- Architect: Gilbert S. Underwood
- Architectural style: Eclectic Mediterranean
- NRHP reference No.: 85000127
- Added to NRHP: 1985

United States Post Office (Burbank, California) is an architecturally significant working post office in downtown Burbank, California, operated by the United States Postal Service (USPS). It was added to the National Register of Historic Places in 1985.

== History ==
The United States Post Office in Burbank, California was built under the Works Progress Administration (WPA). Its construction began in 1937; the cornerstone was laid January 21, 1938. The building was dedicated on April 30, 1938.

In December 1938, a $1,900 federal art commission, giving announced for California and Nevada residents to decorate the Burbank post office building . The building lobby is decorated with two murals painted by Barse Miller depicting the economy of Burbank.

The post office absorbed the Glenoaks Post Office in Burbank in 2014. It was added to the National Register of Historic Places on January 11, 1985.

== Architecture ==
The Burbank post office was designed in 1937 in the eclectic Mediterranean stye by Gilbert Stanley Underwood.

== Additional images ==
Downtown Burbank, California P.O.
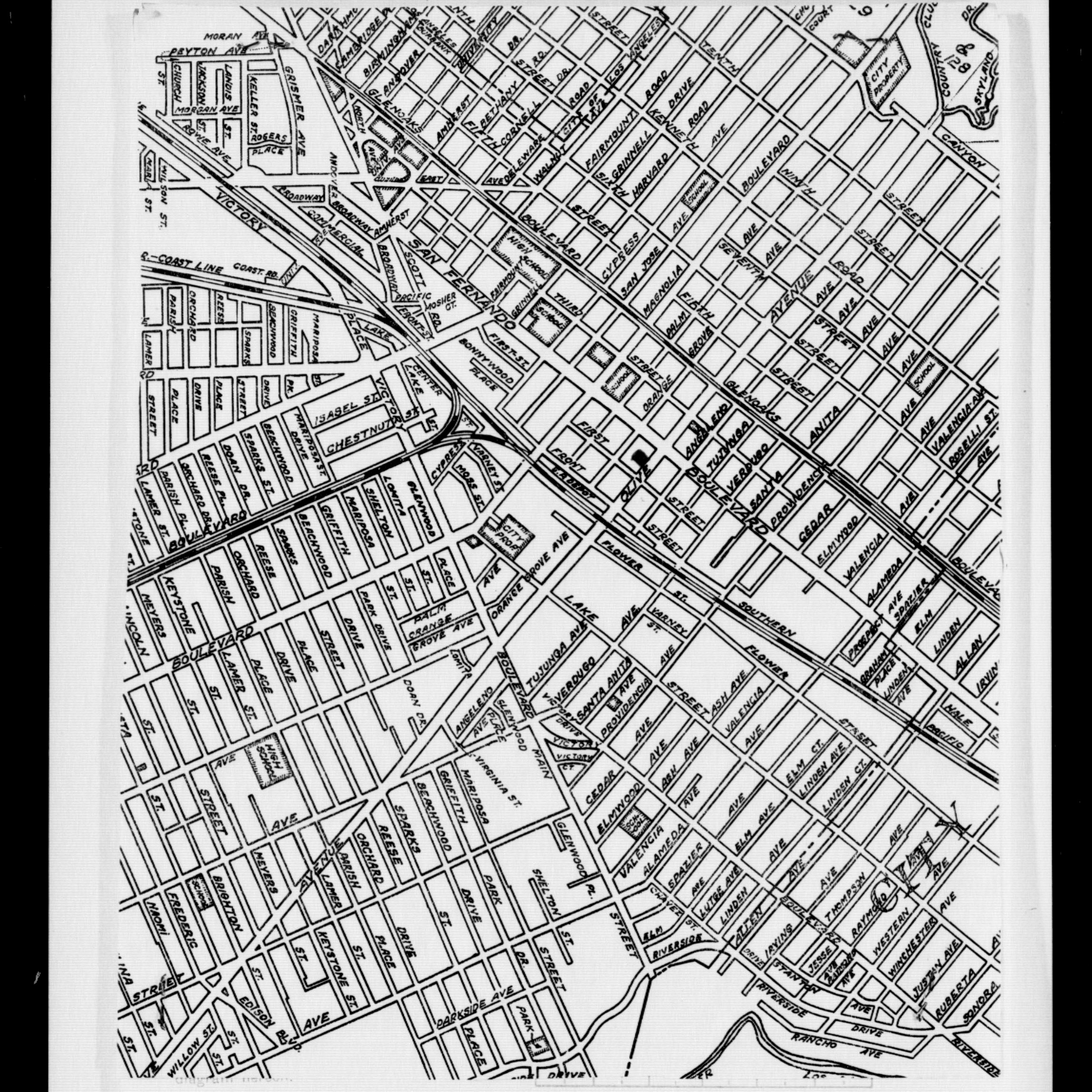
Location marked on 1937 post office paperwork

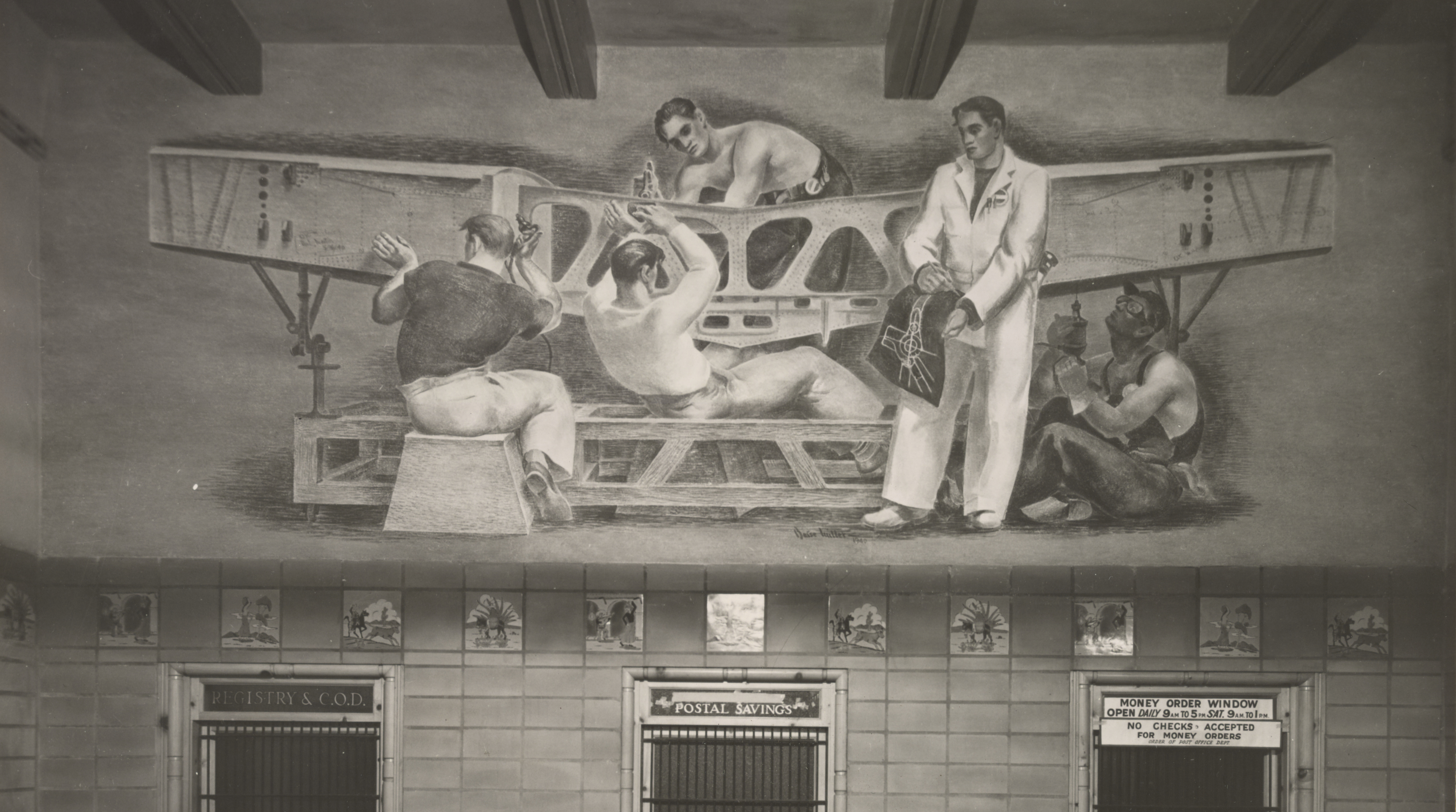
People of Burbank, by Barse Miller, 1940 post office mural
