= United States Post Office and Courthouse (Eureka, California) =

- U.S. Post Office and Courthouse
- U.S. National Register of Historic Places
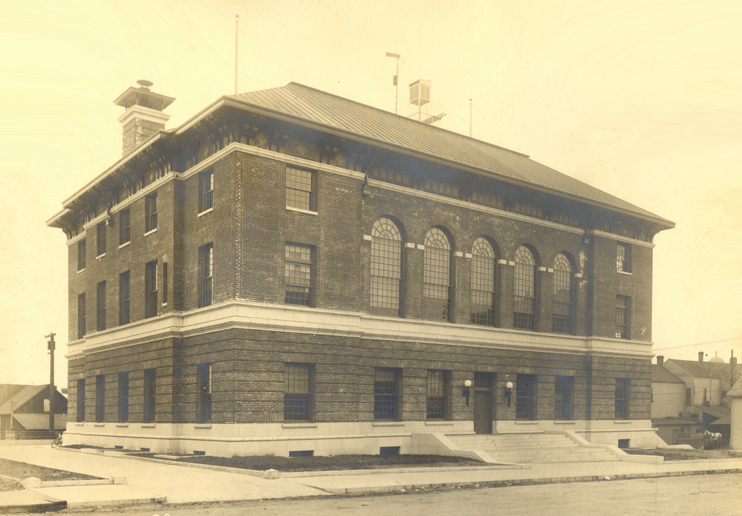

- Location within California Location within the United States
- Location: 514 H Street, Eureka, California
- Coordinates: 40°48′7″N 124°9′47″W
- Area: 0.5 acres (0.20 ha)
- Architect: James Knox Taylor
- Architectural style: Mixed (more than 2 styles from different periods)
- NRHP reference No.: 83001181
- Added to NRHP: February 10, 1983

The United States Post Office and Courthouse in Eureka, California is a courthouse of the United States District Court for the Northern District of California. Completed in 1910, this historic building was listed on the National Register of Historic Places in 1983. Its architecture, designed by James Knox Taylor, is mixed, reflecting several styles. It initially served as a customhouse, in addition to being a courthouse and post office.

== Murals ==
Notable examples of New Deal art were created for the building. Mining and Forestry and Water and Land, two tempera on canvas murals by Thomas Laman, were commissioned in 1938 by the Treasury Relief Art Project and were on display in the post office until the building was sold to a private party in 2002. The murals were restored and are currently on display in the new United States Courthouse (McKinleyville, California).

== See also ==
- List of United States post offices
- List of United States federal courthouses in California
