= United States Post Office (Stockton, California) =

- U.S. Post Office
- U.S. National Register of Historic Places
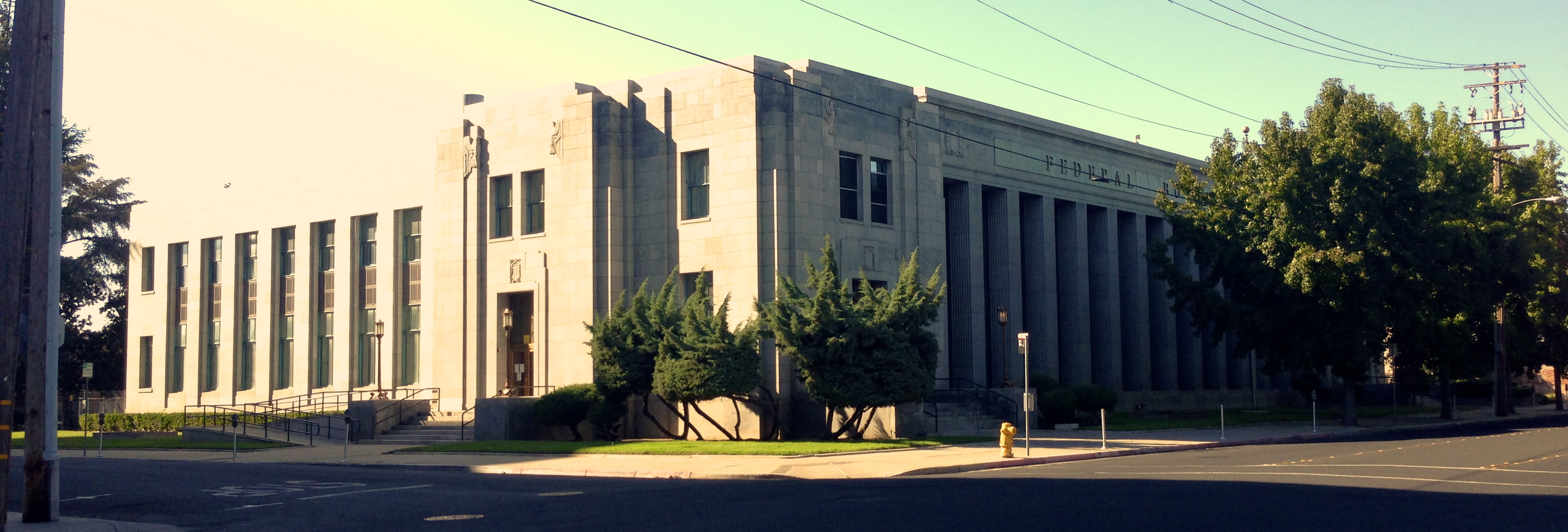

- Location within California Location within the United States
- Interactive map showing the location for U.S. Post Office, Stockton
- Location: 401 N. San Joaquin St., Stockton, California
- Coordinates: 37°57′27″N 121°17′17″W
- Area: 1.7 acres (0.69 ha)
- Built by: Murch Brothers
- Architect: Bliss & Fairweather; Bissell, Howard G.
- Architectural style: "Starved Classicism"
- NRHP reference No.: 83001236
- Added to NRHP: February 10, 1983

The U.S. Post Office, also known as the Federal Building, is a post office and government building in Stockton, California.

The building is designed in a mixture of classical and moderne styles known as "starved classicism". The architecture firm of Bliss and Fairweather designed the building in 1931, and it was built in 1932–33. The building's construction was part of a federal construction program started by Herbert Hoover.

In addition to the post office, the building has housed a variety of other federal offices and is considered "a locally prominent symbol of the federal government".

The U.S. Post Office was added to the National Register of Historic Places on February 10, 1983.

== See also ==
- List of United States post offices
