= United States Post Office (San Pedro, Los Angeles) =

- US Post Office--San Pedro Main
- U.S. National Register of Historic Places
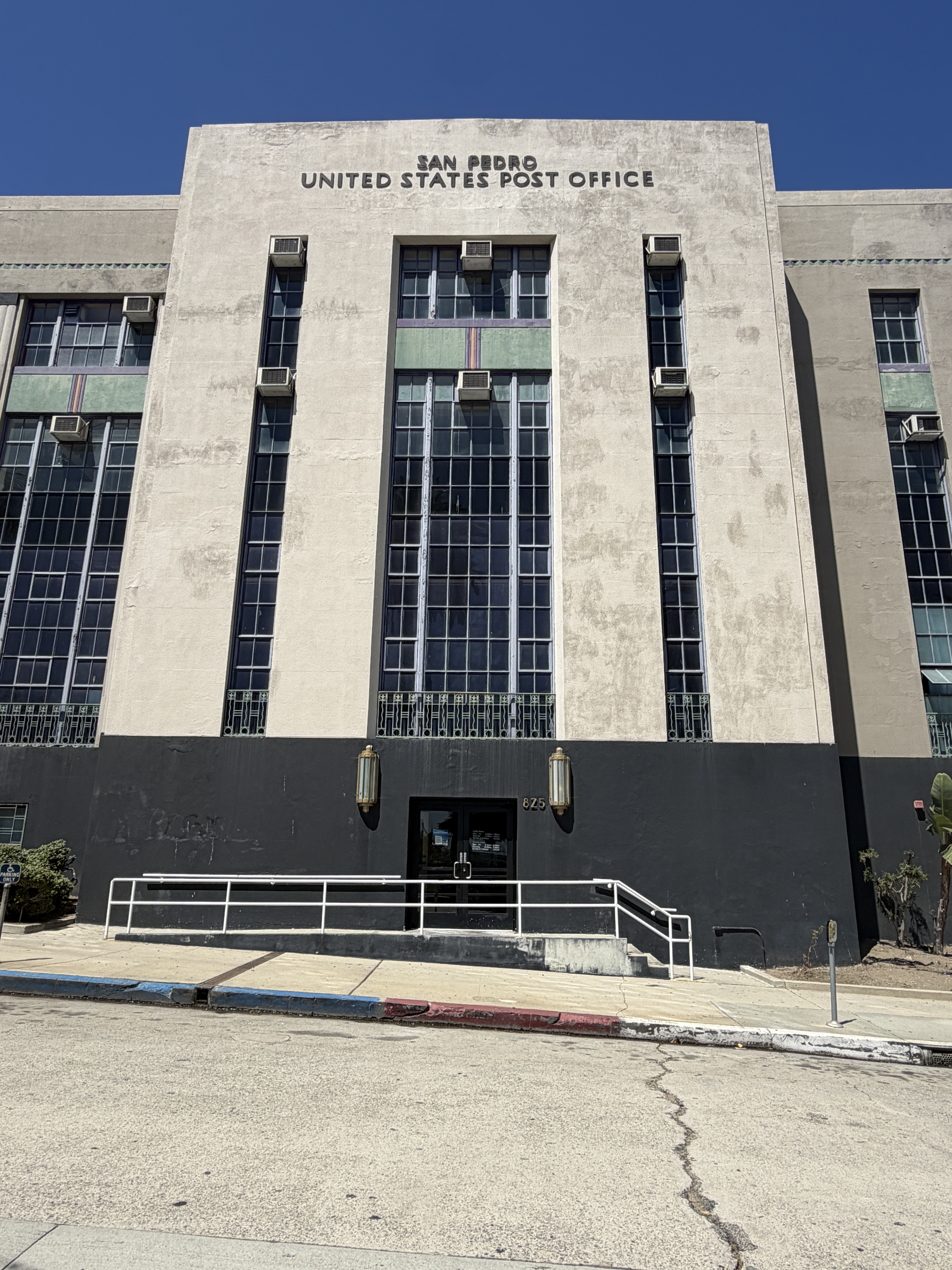
- San Pedro Post Office, 2008

- Location within the Los Angeles metropolitan area Location within California Location within the United States
- Location: 839 S. Beacon St., San Pedro, California
- Coordinates: 33°44′11″N 118°16′51″W
- Built: 1936
- Architect: Simon, Louis A.
- Architectural style: WPA Moderne; Classized Art Deco
- MPS: US Post Office in California 1900-1941 TR
- NRHP reference No.: 85000132
- Added to NRHP: January 11, 1985

The U.S. Post Office in San Pedro, California, is a historic Streamline Moderne post office built in 1936. Designed by supervising architect Louis A. Simon with architects Gordon Kaufmann and W. Horace Austin, the San Pedro Post Office was listed in the National Register of Historic Places in 1985. The building also formerly served as a U.S. Customs Office. The building's use of marble, bronze, and milk glass are typical of 1930s architecture for U.S. government buildings. The floor tile is laid in a basketweave pattern surrounded by black marble, giving the effect of rugs on a marble floor. Some of the original bronze lamps and ink wells are still intact at the public writing desks. The Section of Painting and Sculpture commissioned Fletcher Martin to create the post office mural, titled Mail Transportation (1938). The ground floor hosts the one-room San Pedro Postal Museum, "open to the public on a call-ahead appointment basis."

== See also ==
- National Register of Historic Places listings in Los Angeles
- List of Los Angeles Historic-Cultural Monuments in the Harbor area
- List of United States post offices
- List of United States post office murals
