= Charles Kassler =

American painter

Charles Kassler Jr (September 9, 1897, Denver, Colorado — April 3, 1979, San Diego, California) was a painter, printmaker, and lithographer.

== Early life ==
He lost a hand during a high school chemistry experiment. He studied art and architecture at Princeton University and the Chicago Art Institute.

== Career ==
From 1925 to 1932 Kassler continued his studies while living at various times in New Mexico, Europe, and North Africa. While in France, he apprenticed himself to a well-known fresco painter. After moving to Los Angeles in 1933, he painted the two largest frescoes done under the WPA. The Bison Hunt for the Central Library in Downtown Los Angeles was destroyed by weather damage. Luisa Espinel was a model for the mural Pastoral California at the Plummer Auditorium in Fullerton, in Orange County, California. She became his second wife in 1935. The Pastoral California mural was painted over in 1938 by the school district, just four years after Kassler completed it. It was restored in 1997 after spending almost 60 years hidden from view. Kassler was also commissioned by the WPA to paint eight fresco lunette murals for the Beverly Hills, California post office funded by the Treasury Section of Fine Arts. The murals depict the history of the Pony Express, postal service, and the daily life of the common American family. The post office is now home to the Wallis Annenberg Center for the Performing Arts. After creating murals for the WPA, Kassler taught at Chouinard Art Institute and later worked as a designer in the aerospace industry.
