= Barse Miller =

American painter and art professor

- Born: January 24, 1904; New York City, U.S.
- Died: January 21, 1973 (aged 68); Mexico
- Education: National Academy of Design; Pennsylvania Academy of the Fine Arts
- Occupations: Painter, professor
- Spouses: Betty Miller, Mary Miller
- Children: 2 sons, 1 daughter
- Parent(s): Warren Hastings Miller; Susan Barse Miller

Barse Miller (January 24, 1904 – January 21, 1973) was an American watercolorist, muralist, illustrator, and art educator. He was a professor of art at Queens College for 26 years. His work is at the Metropolitan Museum of Art and the Los Angeles County Museum of Art.

== Life ==
Miller was born circa 1905 in New York City. His father, Warren Hastings Miller, was an editor and author, and his mother, Susan Barse Miller, was an artist. Miller was educated at the National Academy of Design, where he was trained by Hugh Henry Breckenridge, and the Pennsylvania Academy of the Fine Arts, where he was trained by Arthur Beecher Carles.

Miller was a watercolorist, and he exhibited his paintings as early as 1928 in Los Angeles. He also did murals in the post offices of Burbank, California, and Island Pond, Vermont. He was an illustrator for Life magazine during World War II, when he was stationed in the Pacific Theater. After the war, he was a professor of art at Queens College for 26 years, and he was also its chair of the Art department from 1947 to 1953. He also taught at the Art Students League of New York from 1947 to 1973.

With his wife Mary, he had two sons and one daughter. He and his second wife Betty had one daughter. They resided in Plandome Manor, New York. Miller died on January 21, 1973, in Mexico, at age 68. His work is at the Metropolitan Museum of Art and the Los Angeles County Museum of Art.
