= El Viejo Post Office =

- U.S. Post Office
- U.S. National Register of Historic Places
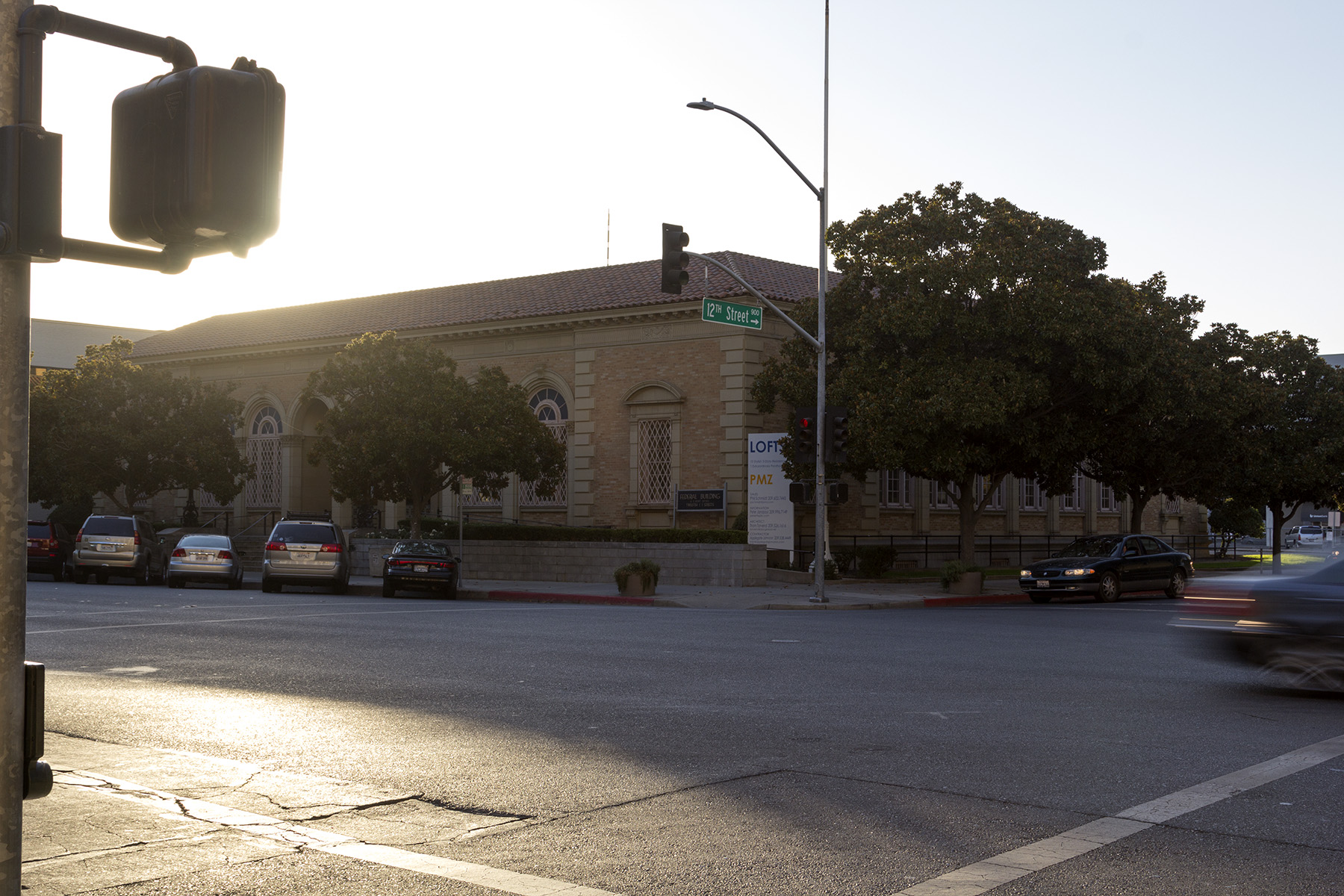

- Location within California Location within the United States
- Location: 1125 I Street; Modesto, California
- Coordinates: 37°38′28″N 120°59′48″W
- Area: 0.6 acres (0.24 ha)
- Built: 1933
- Architect: James A Wetmore
- Architectural style: Mixed (more Than 2 Styles From Different Periods)
- NRHP reference No.: 83001246
- Added to NRHP: February 10, 1983

El Viejo Post Office is a historic post office in downtown Modesto. Built in 1933, the post office houses murals depicting pastoral scenes. The building's roof is made entirely of terra cotta tiles.

The building remained a U.S. Post Office until 2011 when it was closed and the Federal Government auctioned off the building. It was purchased by an investment group and remodeled, however the original murals that were intact at the end of the Postal service era remain intact. Some of the original murals were removed and lost after a remodeling of the post office in 1960, however two were found recently. The Federal government took the lost murals into custody prior to them being re-hung in their original place. The building currently houses a law office, although the murals and some of the original brass post office boxes remain on display.

== See also ==
- National Register of Historic Places listings in Stanislaus County, California
- List of United States post offices
- List of United States post office murals
