= New Deal artwork =

U.S. work-relief output (1933–1942)

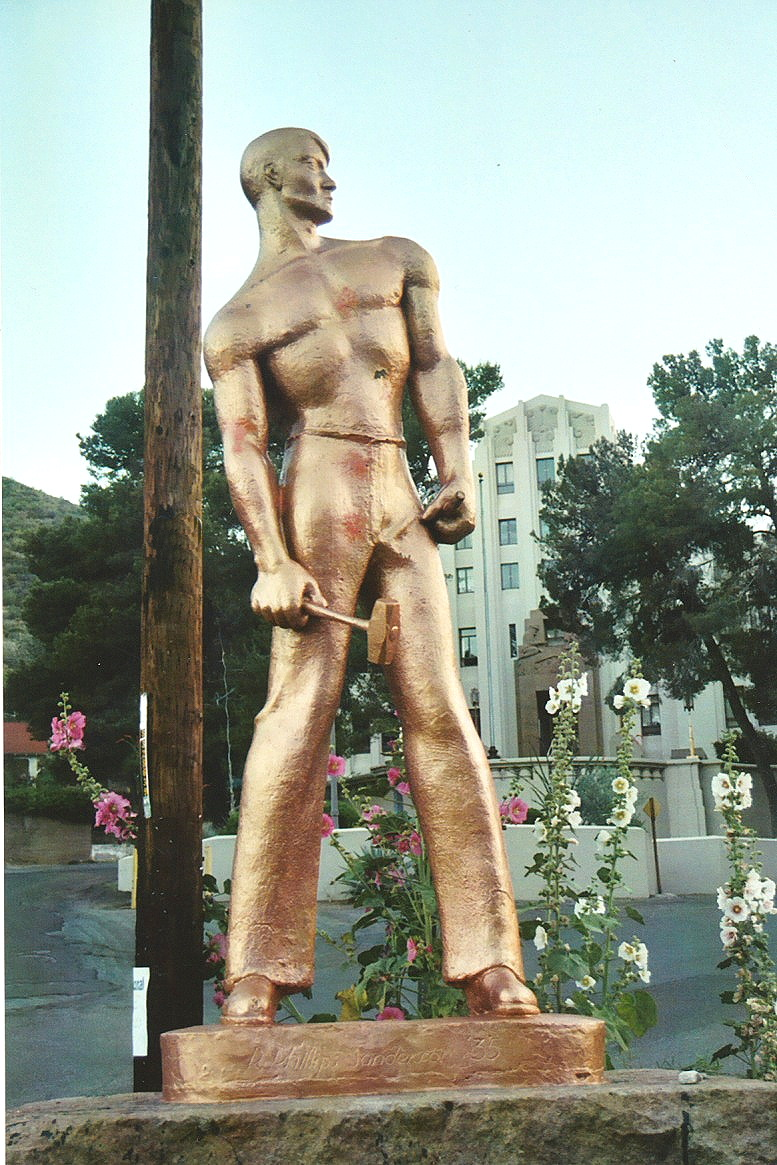
Copper Miner (1936) by Raymond Phillips Sanderson, located at Cochise County Courthouse in Bisbee, Arizona

New Deal artwork is an umbrella term used to describe the creative output organized and funded by the Roosevelt administration's New Deal response to the Great Depression. This work produced between 1933 and 1942 ranges in content and form from Dorothea Lange's photographs for the Farm Security Administration to the Coit Tower murals to the library-etiquette posters from the Federal Art Project to the architecture of the Solomon Courthouse in Nashville, Tennessee. The New Deal sought to "democratize the arts" and is credited with creating a "great body of distinguished work and fostering a national aesthetic."

== Background ==
While work of this era is sometimes called “WPA art” the architecture and the creative arts groups of the Works Progress Administration’s Federal One (Federal Art Project, Federal Writers' Project, et al.) were only some of the New Deal agencies commissioning creative works. (Federal One’s budget at its height in 1935 was $27 million, representing 0.04% of GDP.) The Treasury Department’s Public Works of Art Project, Section of Painting and Sculpture, and Treasury Relief Art Project, as well as the Civil Works Administration, the Public Works Administration, and the Civilian Conservation Corps were also charged with creating New Deal art. Documentary photographs for the FSA as well as the Office of War Information and the Resettlement Administration are also considered New Deal art. The Historic Sites Act of 1935 instigated a similar documentary record, including photographs and architectural plans, for the National Park Service properties.

(Note: New Deal historiographic work is a separate, albeit overlapping, topic that includes “the Historic American Buildings Survey (HABS), the Index of American Design, the establishment of the National Archives, the historic restoration work of the Civilian Conservation Corps, the WPA’s Historical Records Survey, and the hundreds of WPA books and writings covering the histories of states, towns, folklore, art, African Americans, American Indians, Latinos, and more.”)

Collectively, the artists of the New Deal produced a vast archive: Murals, including 1,100 post office murals (list), free-standing and bas relief sculpture, an estimated 30,000 posters, more than 700 books and pamphlets and radio scripts, and architectural details for scores of public buildings, in a style now called WPA Moderne.

The New Deal arts programs emphasized regionalism, social realism, class conflict, proletarian interpretations and audience participation. The unstoppable collective powers of common man, contrasted to the failure of individualism, was a favorite theme.

Both the Whitney Museum of Art and the Museum of Modern Art created gallery shows in 1936 showcasing works by Treasury and WPA artists, respectively, that had been commissioned through the federal programs. The New York Times reported that the Whitney show “abounds in vitality” and was especially complementary about the sculpture, including William Zorach’s Benjamin Franklin and Heinz Warneke’s Bears.

According to art critic Harold Rosenberg, New Deal art projects were less important for the substance of the art created than for their impact in makling fine arts work more professionalized and decreasing its dependence on the wealthy.

== See also ==
- List of Federal Art Project artists
- List of New Deal murals
- List of United States post office murals
- List of New Deal sculpture
