= Shirley Julian =

American artist (1914–1995)

- Staschen, c. 1930
- Born: Shirley Staschen; July 29, 1914; Oakland, California, U.S.
- Died: November 26, 1995 (aged 90); San Rafael, California, U.S.
- Other names: Shirley Staschen Triest, Shirley Julian Staschen
- Known for: Painting, printmaking
- Spouses: Valentine White Julien (divorced), Al Podesta (divorced), Frank Triest (divorced)

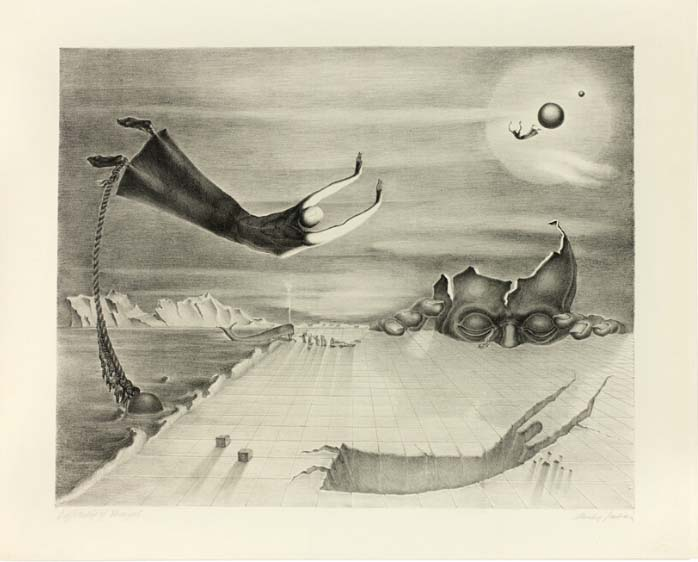
Difficulty of Thought, c. 1935–1942

Shirley Julian (1914–1995), born as Shirley Staschen, and also known as Shirley Triest, was an American visual artist who co-founded the San Francisco Artists and Writers Union, and worked for the Works Progress Administration (WPA). Julian was a pacifist, and anarchist.

== Early life and education ==
Shirley Staschen was born in Oakland, California on July 29, 1914.

She attended the San Francisco Art Institute and the California College of Arts and Crafts (now California College of the Arts).

== Career ==
In the early 1930s she obtained a job with the Public Works of Art Project (PWAP). Around this time she married her first husband, fellow artist, Valentine White Julien (1908–1964).

In 1933 Staschen joined the WPA team led by Bernard Zakheim, painting one of the Coit Tower murals in San Francisco. The following year she participated in the San Francisco General Strike by picketing at Coit Tower. Also in the early 1930s Staschen attended the organizing meeting of the San Francisco Artists and Writers Union, along with Zakheim, Kenneth Rexroth, and future husband Frank Triest. Towards the end of the decade Staschen assisted the artist Richard Gentry Ayer (1909–1967) with his WPA murals for the Aquatic Park in San Francisco. That led to a job demonstrating lithographic technique at the 1939 World's Fair.

Staschen divorced Valentine Julien and then married Al Podesta, a fellow pacifist and manual laborer. The couple supported conscientious objection to World War II. During the war years Staschen took care of her child and worked as a commercial photographer.

Towards the end of the war Staschen divorced Al Podesta and married Frank Triest (who she would eventually divorce).

Staschen has participated in two interviews for oral histories. She was interviewed in 1964 for part of the Archives of American Art's New Deal and the Arts project. She was interviewed again at the end of her life for the Regional Oral History Office of the Bancroft Library at the University of California. The interview became the major part of 1997 publication A Life on the First Waves of Radical Bohemianism in San Francisco.

== Collections ==
Her work (under the name Shirley Julian) is in the collection of the Art Institute of Chicago, the Berkeley Art Museum and Pacific Film Archive, the Krannert Art Museum, the Metropolitan Museum of Art, the Museum of Modern Art, and the Fine Arts Museums of San Francisco.
