= Writers' Union =

Writers' Union may refer to the following organizations:

== Statewide unions ==
- Writers Union of Armenia
- Azerbaijani Writers Union
- Writers' Union of Canada
- Chinese Writers Union
- Estonian Writers' Union
- Writers' Guild of Great Britain
- Hungarian Writers' Union
- Iraqi Writers Union
- Irish Writers Union
- Writers' Union of Kazakhstan
- Lithuanian Writers' Union
- Moldovan Writers' Union
- Nazi Germany Writers' Union: Reichsverband deutscher Schriftsteller
- Norwegian Writers’ Union
- Writers Union of the Philippines: Unyon ng mga Manunulat sa Pilipinas
- Polish Writers' Union
- Writers' Union of Romania
- Union of Soviet Writers
- Sudanese Writers Union
- Turkish Writers' Union: Türkiye Yazarlar Birliği
- Writers Union of Turkey: Türkiye Yazarlar Sendikası
- National Writers' Union of Ukraine

== Other ==
- Arab Writers Union
- National Writers Union
- Progressive Writers Union
- Quebec Writers Union: Union des écrivaines et des écrivains québécois
- San Francisco Artists and Writers Union
