= Aeroflot Flight H-925 =

Yak-40 accident on March 30, 1977 in Zhdanov

Aeroflot Flight 925N
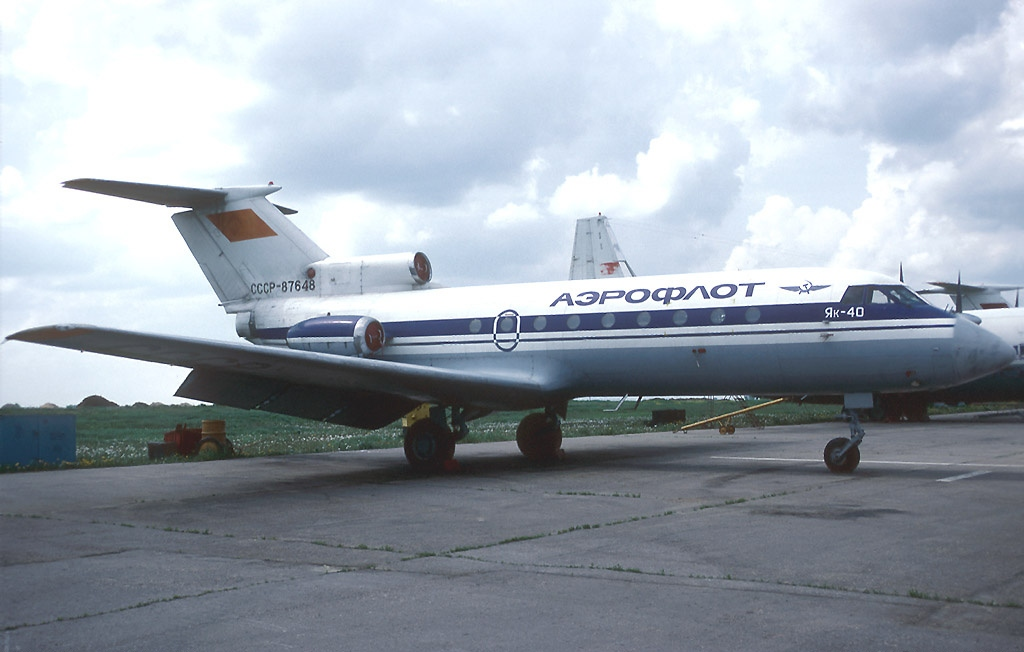
- An Aeroflot Yak-40 aircraft

Occurrence
- Date: March 30, 1977
- Summary: Controlled flight into terrain
- Site: 1.5 km from Zhdanov Airport, Mariupol, Donetsk Oblast, UkSSR

Aircraft
- Aircraft type: Yakovlev Yak-40
- Operator: Aeroflot, Ukrainian UGA
- Registration: CCCP-87738
- Flight origin: Dnepropetrovsk Airport
- Destination: Zhdanov Airport
- Occupants: 28
- Passengers: 24
- Crew: 4
- Fatalities: 8
- Injuries: 2
- Survivors: 20

Aeroflot Flight 925N was a scheduled passenger flight from Dnepropetrovsk to Zhdanov. On March 30, 1977, the Yakovlev Yak-40 operating the flight hit a concrete pole and crashed into terrain, 1.5 km from Zhdanov Airport, killing 8 out of the 28 occupants.

== Accident ==
The crew operating 925N were from the 64th and 327th air division, which had consisted of commander (PIC), First Officer, Flight Engineer and Flight attendant V. A. Prima.

The Yak-40 began descent towards Zhdanov Airport, the crew had failed to state the path of their descent to the controller at Zhdanov. The controller did not demand them to turn back, however the crew had an agreement to check the operation of the ILS, which set an alarm of the height being 50 meters, it was assumed to make a approach from it. At the same time however, the sky was covered with clouds with wind from the northeast blowing, causing the visibility only to be 2,000 meters.

The aircraft beginning the final approach at a course of 15° from the north and performed the fourth turn, the dispatcher was then contacted by a Ilyushin Il-18 (CCCP-75749) of the Baku Air Department, asking for a landing course of 195° from the south. The controller turned off the SP-50 system without telling the crew of the Yak-40. The crew completed fourth turn and started the approach, which they asked for the SP-50 system to be reopened, which the controller did. The radio stations were only opened after 25-30 seconds after the request, which the SP-50 was turned on 3 minutes later, the Yak-40 was already than half than two minutes away from the runway. Causing the crew to have the SP-50 system deactivated during the landing, and the OSP system could be only used when in a distance of 5-6 km away from the runway.

The aircraft entered the glide path, but failed to report it or requesting clearance for landing, and began to decrease the rate of climb to 4 meters, approaching the runway, the aircraft was lower to 2 meters and remained there for the rest of the landing. A person, stated that the aircraft was in a fog with visibility less than 500 meters, and passengers said they could see that ground. The crew was distracted by monitoring the aircraft’s position by the instruments.

The plane sank below the gilde path and flew towards the fog, realizing they could crash into the BPRM, the captain tried to pull the aircraft out off the descent and extended the throttle. The jet’s right wing was tore by the concrete pole, causing a fire on the wing. The plane banked at a tilt of 40-45° and crashed into the ground, 610 meters away from the end of the runway. 8 people were killed, which consisted of the entire flight deck and 5 passengers, leaving 20 survivors.

== Investigation ==
The cause of the accident was due to pilot negligence, which the crew decided to continue the approach below the gilde path under VFR mode whilst in foggy conditions.

== See also ==
- YAK-Service Flight 9633
