= Victor Arnautoff =

Russian-American painter and academic (1896–1979)

- Виктор Арнаутов
- Arnautoff in 1940
- Born: Victor Mikhail Arnautoff; November 11, 1896; Uspenovka, Russian Empire
- Died: March 22, 1979 (aged 82); Leningrad, Soviet Union
- Known for: Murals
- Notable work: Coit Tower murals, Life of Washington murals

Victor Mikhailovich Arnautoff (Russian: Виктор Михайлович Арнаутов; November 11, 1896 – March 22, 1979) was a Russian-American painter and professor of art. He worked in San Francisco and the Bay Area from 1925 to 1963, including two decades as a teacher at Stanford University, and was particularly prolific as a muralist during the 1930s. He became a naturalized U.S. citizen, but returned to the Soviet Union after the death of his wife, continuing his career there before his death.

== Early life in Russia and China ==
Arnautoff was the son of a Russian Orthodox priest. He showed a talent for art from an early age and hoped to study art after graduating from the gymnasium in Mariupol. With the outbreak of World War I, he enrolled in the Yelizavetgrad Cavalry School. He went on to hold military leadership positions in the army of Nicholas II and the White Siberian Army, and was repeatedly awarded medals for his service. While in cavalry school, he learned fencing, which would remain a hobby throughout his life.

With the defeat of the Whites in Siberia, he crossed into northeastern China and surrendered his weapons. He remained in China for five years. He again tried to pursue art, signing up for schooling in Harbin, but was impoverished and took a position training the cavalry of (and possibly fighting for) the warlord Zhang Zuolin. While serving the warlord in Mukden, China, he met and married Lydia Blonsky and they had two sons, Michael and Vasily.

== Schooling and early work in San Francisco and Mexico ==
In November 1925 Arnautoff went to San Francisco on a student visa to study at the California School of Fine Arts. There he studied sculpture with Edgar Walter (sculptor) and painting with Gertrude Partington Albright and other instructors. He was given a scholarship as the best student in his year, and also became active in the city's leftist arts scene.

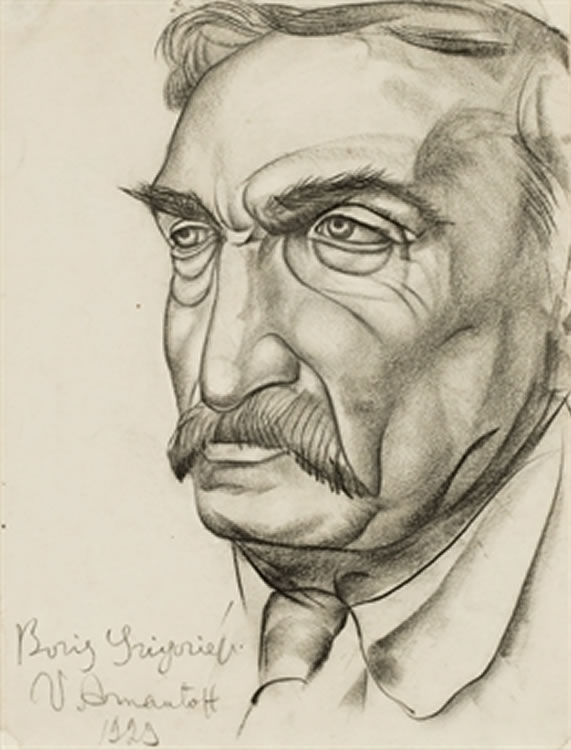
Boris Grigoriev (1929)

As his student visa expired, Arnautoff brought his family from China and then continued to Mexico in 1929. On Ralph Stackpole's recommendation, he became an assistant to the muralist Diego Rivera (who also spoke Russian as a result of travels in Paris and Russia). Rivera and Arnautoff worked on a series of murals at the National Palace and also at the Palace of Cortés, Cuernavaca. After starting the murals in the National Palace, Rivera went to San Francisco to paint a mural in the new Stock Exchange building, leaving Arnautoff in charge of the Mexican projects for a period of several months. During this period, Arnautoff matured as a muralist, both through technical practice (in San Francisco he had not done frescoes larger than an oil painting) and in style (Rivera advised him to move away from traditional European styles and learn from native Mexican styles).

A third son, Jacob, was born in Mexico, and named (somewhat indirectly) after Rivera. While in Mexico, Arnautoff also met Bernard Zakheim, another leftist San Francisco muralist who had been born in the then-Russian-Empire. The two would later work together on the Coit Tower murals.

== Work in the Bay Area ==
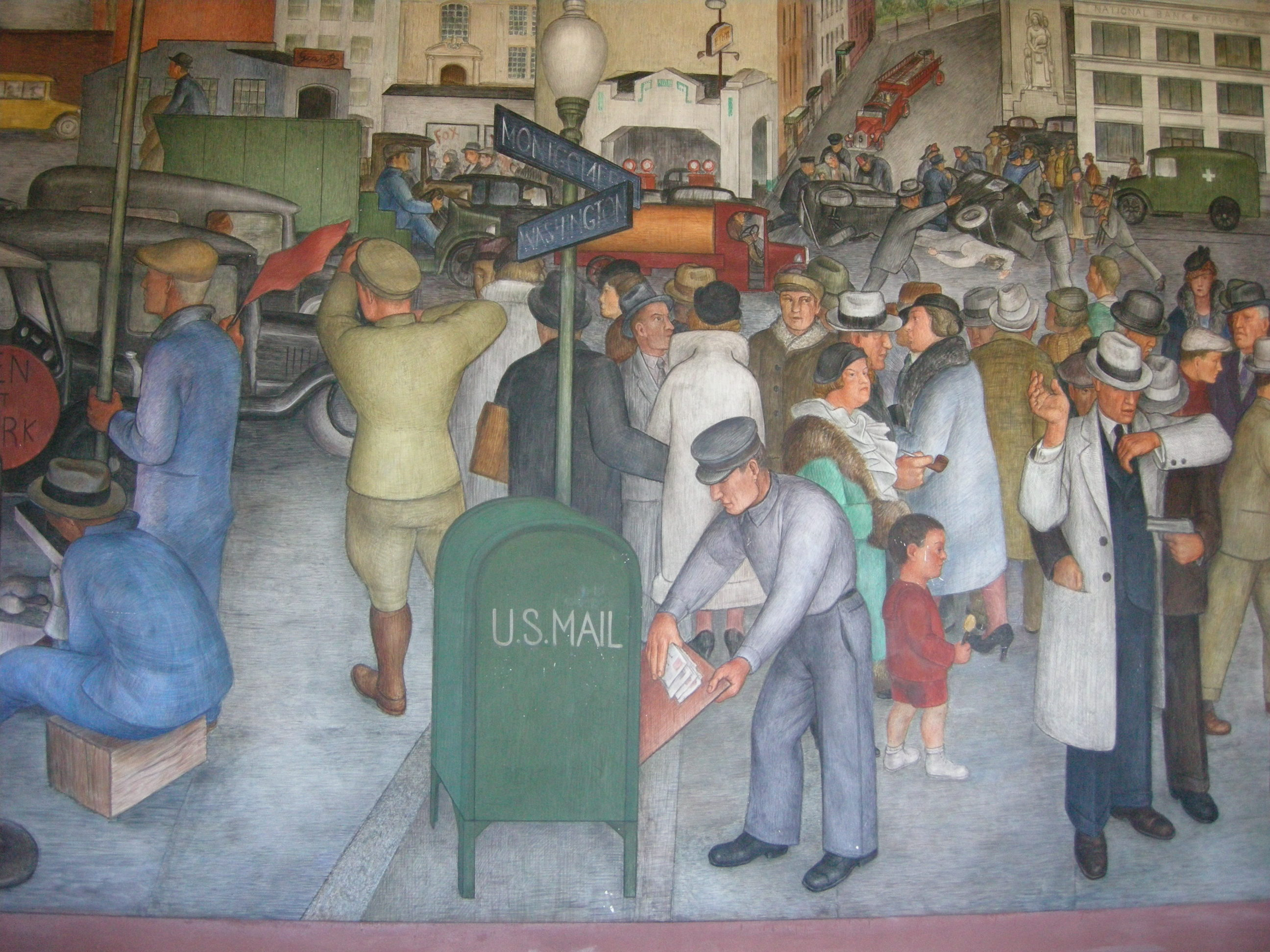
"City Life" mural, Coit Tower, San Francisco, painted by Arnautoff

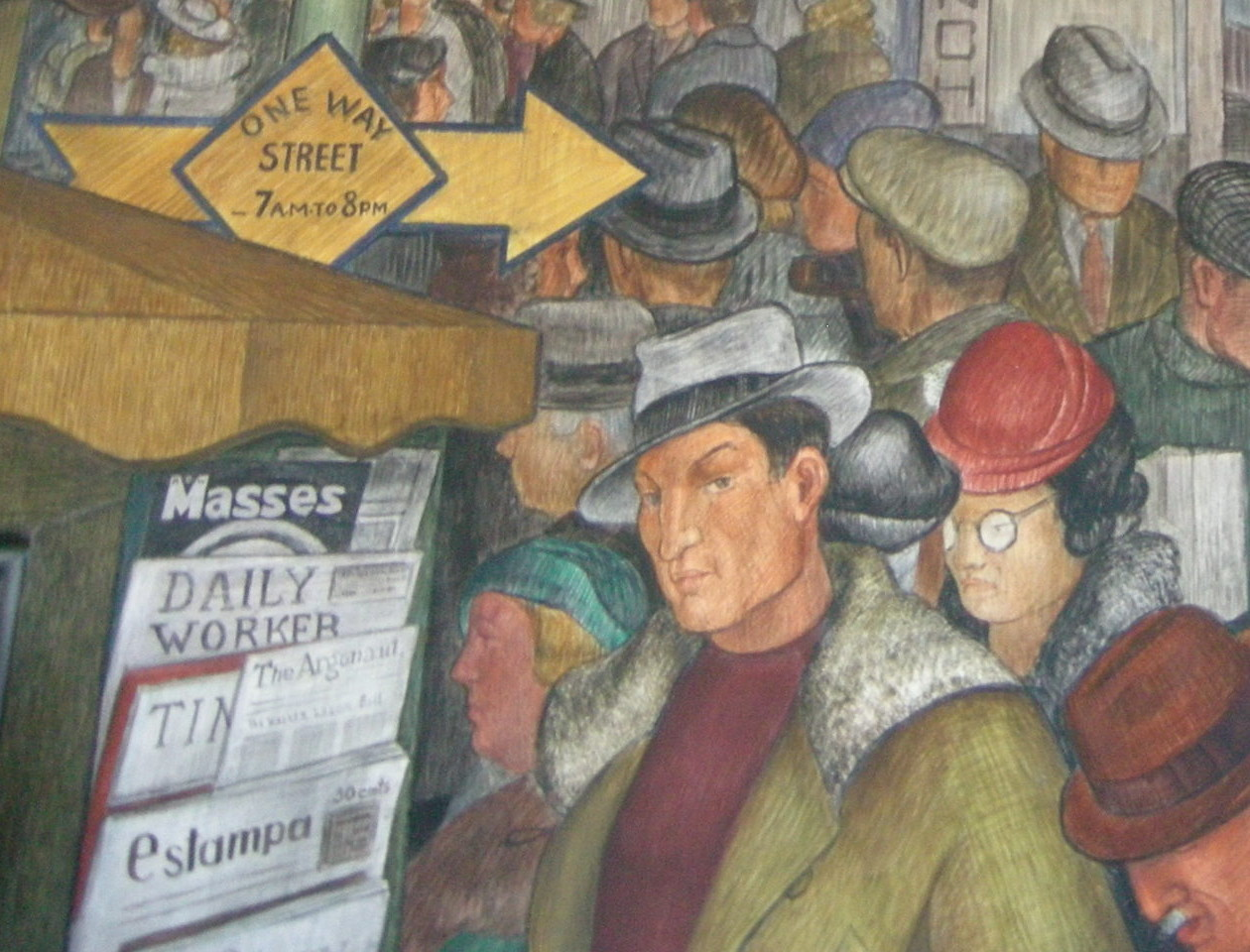
Another part of the City Life mural, featuring a self-portrait of Arnautoff, near a magazine rack containing socialist/communist magazines.

In 1931 the family returned to San Francisco. Arnautoff's first significant work after returning was a mural on the wall of his studio, which he opened to the public.

Shortly afterward, he completed his first mural commission, for the Palo Alto Medical Clinic in Palo Alto (where he had been a patient) in August 1932. Arnautoff's mural series was in the historical Roth building, all were medically-themed murals done in the recess under a loggia with four panels of modern medicine and other panels showing primitive medicine, and additionally he painted four medallions of Joseph Lister, Hippocrates, Louis Pasteur, and Wilhelm Röntgen are on the exterior wall of the loggia. Three of the four murals done in color that feature modern medicine depict Luther Emmett Holt, William Osler, and Harvey Cushing. The unveiling of this mural caused a traffic jam and some controversy, in part because one of the murals showed a doctor examining a female patient whose bare breasts were at eye-level. Like his other works in the Bay Area, the murals were frescoes.

In 1934 he was chosen to paint one of the murals to be done at Coit Tower in San Francisco, with funding from the Public Works of Art Project. He was also appointed technical director of the Coit Tower murals project. He is prominently represented there by a mural depicting San Francisco city life. This mural includes a self-portrait as well as a portrait of his son, Michael. The mural caused some controversy at the time, because the newsstand he painted (pictured, right) excluded the conservative San Francisco Chronicle and included left-wing newspapers. It also included other references to the "lack of concern" people show each other, including a sign for Charlie Chaplin's "City Lights", which is concerned in part with the same theme.

Arnautoff was, along with fellow activist Bernard Zakheim, perhaps the most prolific muralist in San Francisco in the 1930s. He completed not only the murals at the Palo Alto Clinic and Coit Tower, but also at the Presidio chapel, George Washington High School, and the California School of Fine Arts library. All of these murals were focused on humanist themes, including concerns about class, labor, and power. He also painted five post offices (College Station and Linden, Texas; Pacific Grove, Richmond, and South San Francisco, California), and held solo exhibitions throughout the 1930s.

== Teaching and political activity ==
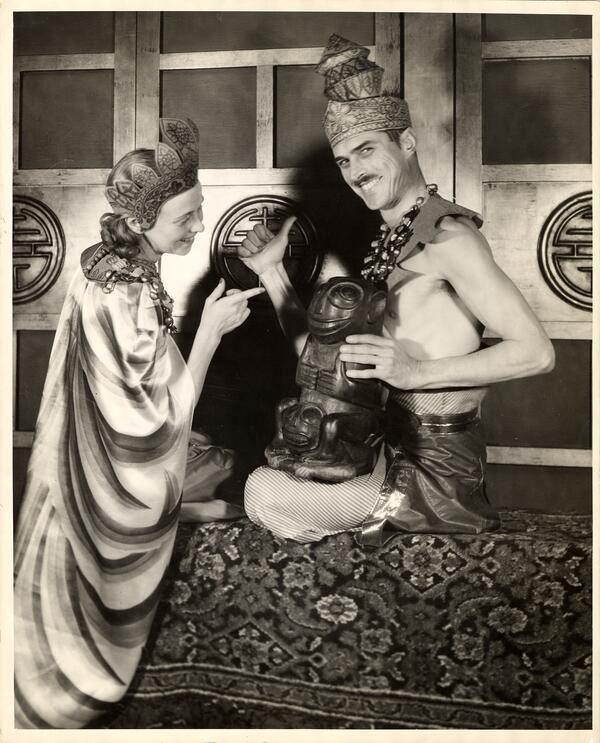
Arnautoff with Esther Bruton in 1936

Arnautoff taught sculpture and fresco painting privately and at the California School of Fine Arts, first during summer sessions and as a regular instructor beginning in 1936. He taught art at Stanford University from 1938 to 1962. Beginning in 1947, he also taught art courses at the California Labor School, including printmaking. At Stanford, Richard Diebenkorn was one of his students; Diebenkorn considered Arnautoff a mentor and admired his intellectual and political stances.

Beginning with his association with Rivera, Arnautoff's political views moved to the left, and he joined the Communist Party as well as the American Artists' Congress and the San Francisco Artists and Writers Union. His style was generally more subtle than Rivera's and other social realists, but his politics were nevertheless reflected in his work, which has been described as being part of a mural arts movement that "hoped to inspire change through criticism of the present political system".

In 1955, an Arnautoff lithograph titled "DIX McSmear", associating Vice President Richard Nixon with McCarthyism, created controversy. As a result, there were calls for Stanford to dismiss him. The lithograph was then used as the cover for an issue of The Nation. After he was interrogated by a House Unamerican Activities Committee subcommittee, there were again calls for Stanford to dismiss him. However, the faculty committee that reviewed his case declined to make such a recommendation to the president, and Arnautoff remained a faculty member.

== Later life and return to Soviet Ukraine ==
Following the death of his wife in 1961, Arnautoff retired from Stanford. He returned to the Soviet Union in 1963, settling in Mariupol, Ukraine, where he had attended gymnasium. While living there, he published a memoir, and created large tile mosaics on public buildings, including a school and a communications building. He also did woodcuts for books, and had several solo exhibitions.

He remarried in 1970 and died in Leningrad on March 22, 1979.

== Life of Washington mural controversy ==
Since at least 1968, Arnautoff's 13 fresco murals at George Washington High School, collectively titled Life of Washington, have been controversial due to their depiction of slaves and a dead Native American. Arnautoff placed slaves and working people in the center of several of the panels, rather than Washington, and in the words of Arnautoff's biographer, "the mural makes clear that slave labor provide[d] the plantation's economic basis", at a time when high school history classes "ignored... that the nation's founders... owned other human beings as chattel". Similarly, Arnautoff placed the body of a dead Native American at the feet of pioneers, "challenging the prevailing narrative that westward expansion had been into largely vacant territory waiting for white pioneers to develop its full potential". After the 1968 protests, when new, complementary murals were painted by Dewey Crumpler, Arnautoff indicated he was glad his work had "provided the impetus for this new progressive work".

In 2019, a new wave of criticism caused the San Francisco school board to announce plans to paint over the murals, on grounds that these depictions sent a racist message. The San Francisco Board of Education voted in June 2019 to develop a plan to destroy all 13 panels of the mural as a form of "reparations" for past crimes. However, after criticism from (among others) the local NAACP and muralist Dewey Crumpler the school board announced it planned to revisit the original decision. On the evening of August 13, 2019, the Board decided by a vote of 4-to-3 on a compromise, namely to hide the murals rather than destroy them. Jon Golinger, executive director of the Coalition to Protect Public Art, remarked, "While it is a step in the right direction to take permanent destruction off the table, we will continue to strongly oppose spending $815,000 to permanently wall off the murals so nobody has the choice to see them or learn from them."

On July 27, 2021, a superior court judge overturned the school board's decision to cover up the murals. Ruling in favor of historic preservation laws, she wrote: "Neutral administrative procedures must be applied without regard to political interests."

== Public works ==
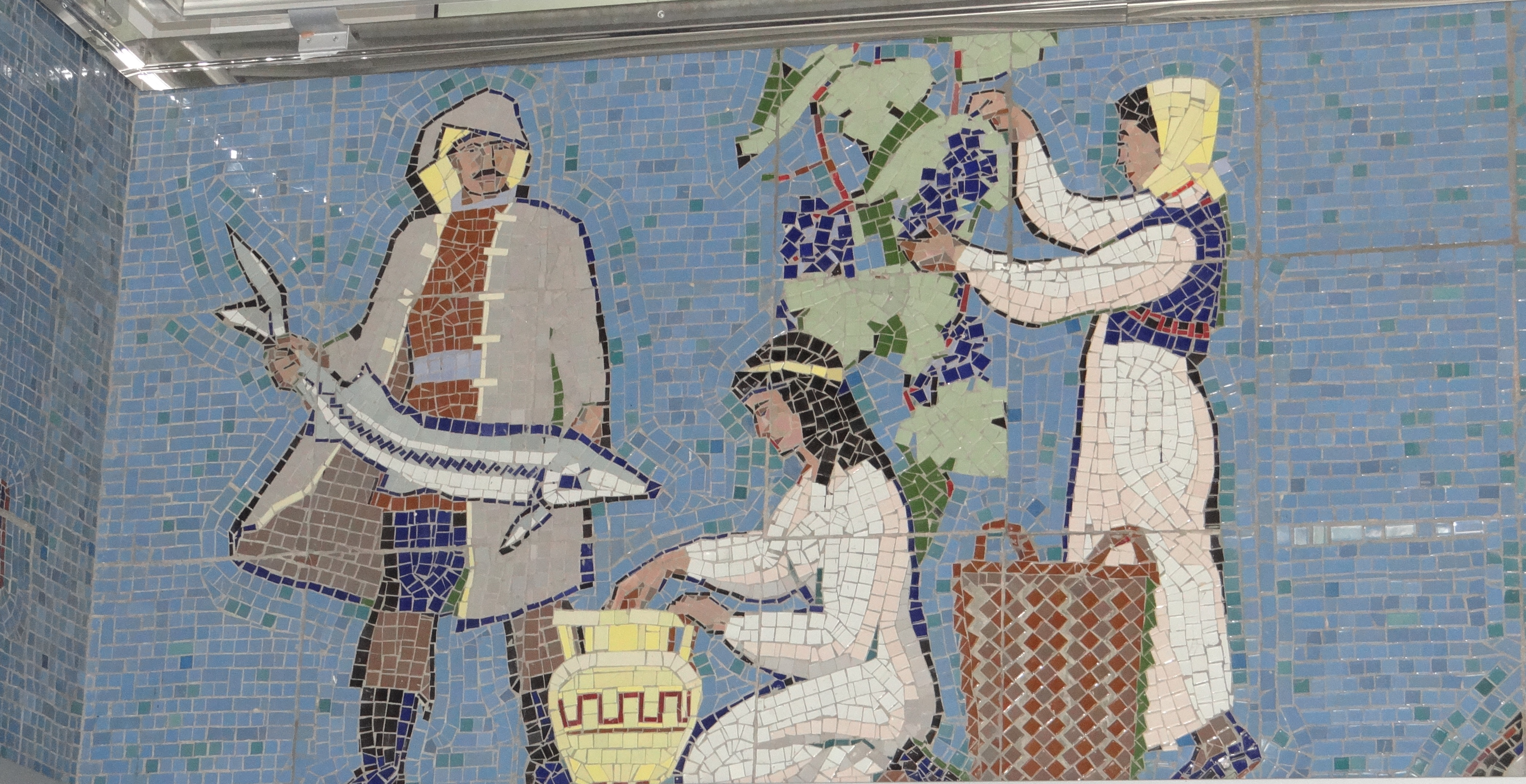
Detail of Arnautoff's mural for the Mariupol International Airport

=== In California ===
- Fresco murals of medical clinic (1932), Roth Building, 300 Homer St, Palo Alto, California, United States
- Peacetime Activities of the Army (1935) fresco mural, Presidio Chapel, San Francisco, California, United States
- Exterior reliefs and the controversial 13 fresco murals "Life of Washington" (1936), George Washington High School, San Francisco, California, United States
- Urban Life mural, Coit Tower, San Francisco, California, United States
- Lovers' Point (1940), oil on canvas post office mural, Pacific Grove, California, United States
- Richmond Industrial City (1941), oil on canvas post office mural, Richmond, California, United States
- South San Francisco, Past and Present (1941), oil on canvas post office mural, South San Francisco, California, United States

=== Other locations ===
- The Last Crop (1938) post office mural, Linden, Texas, United States
- Post Office and School No. 54, Mariupol, Ukraine
- Mariupol International Airport, mosaic friezes, 1968-1970

== Gallery ==
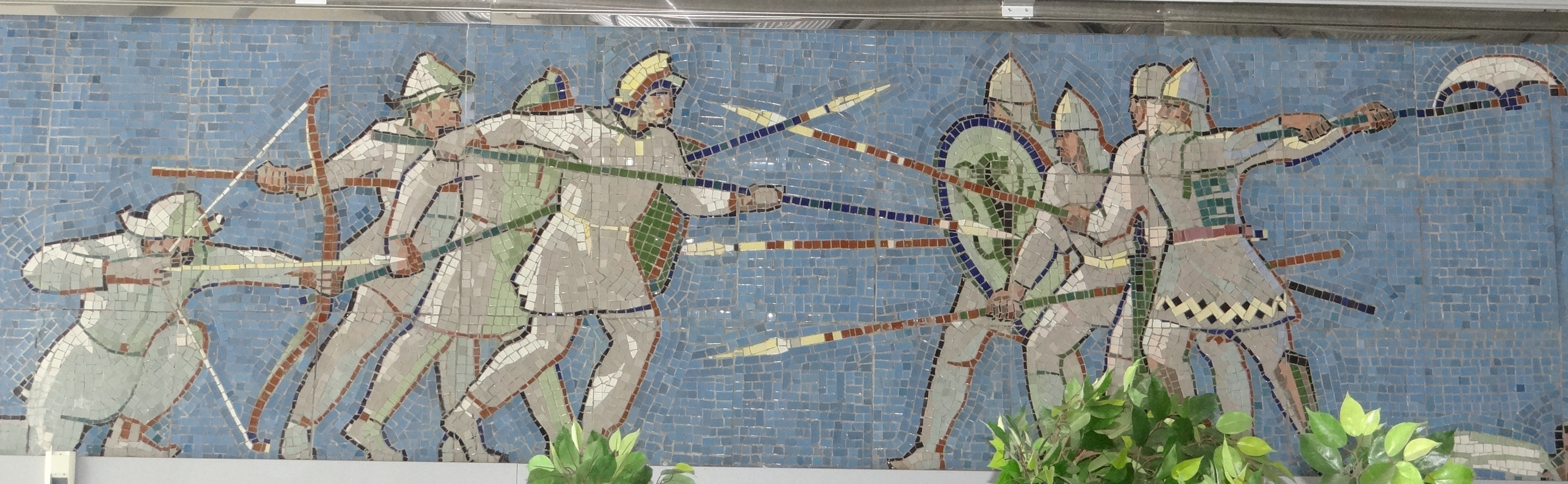
Detail of Arnautoff's mural for the Mariupol International Airport

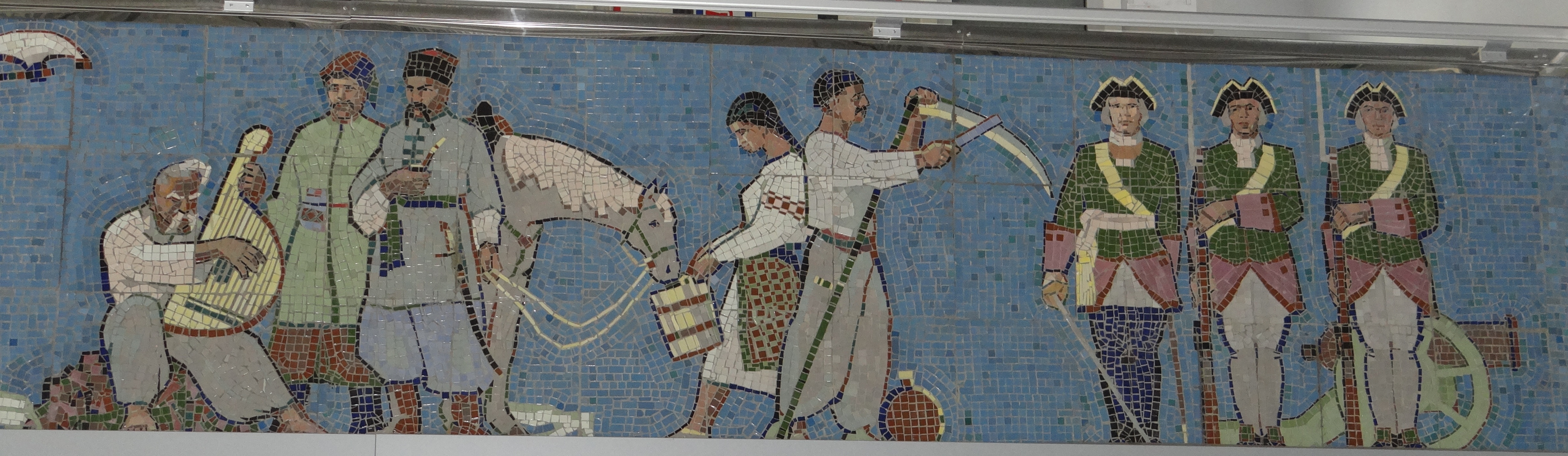
Detail of Arnautoff's mural for the Mariupol International Airport

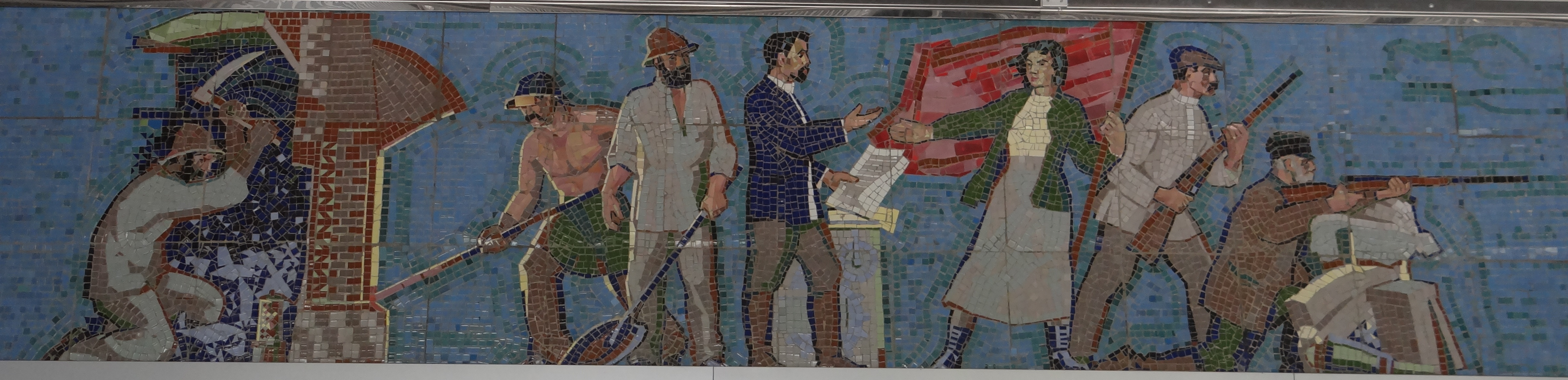
Detail of Arnautoff's mural for the Mariupol International Airport

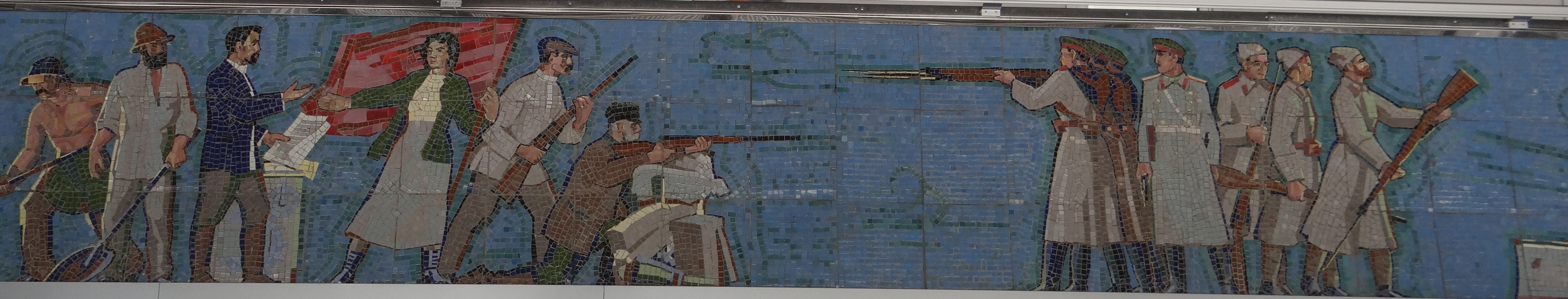
Detail of Arnautoff's mural for the Mariupol International Airport

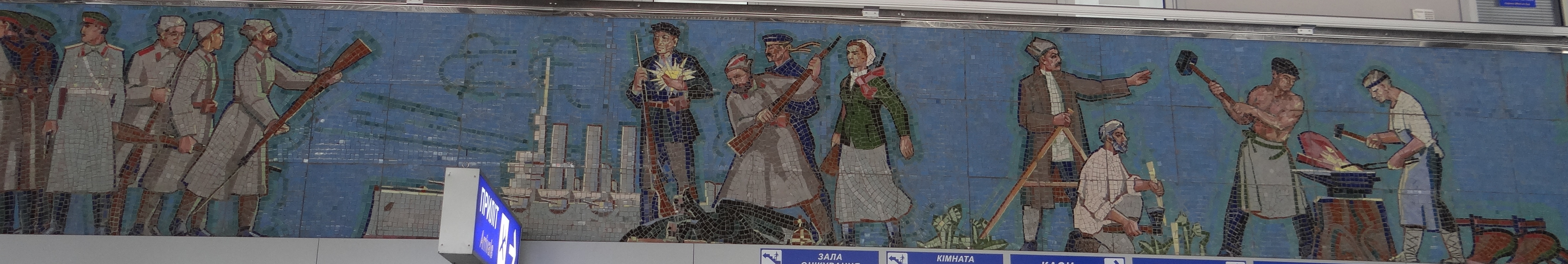
Detail of Arnautoff's mural for the Mariupol International Airport

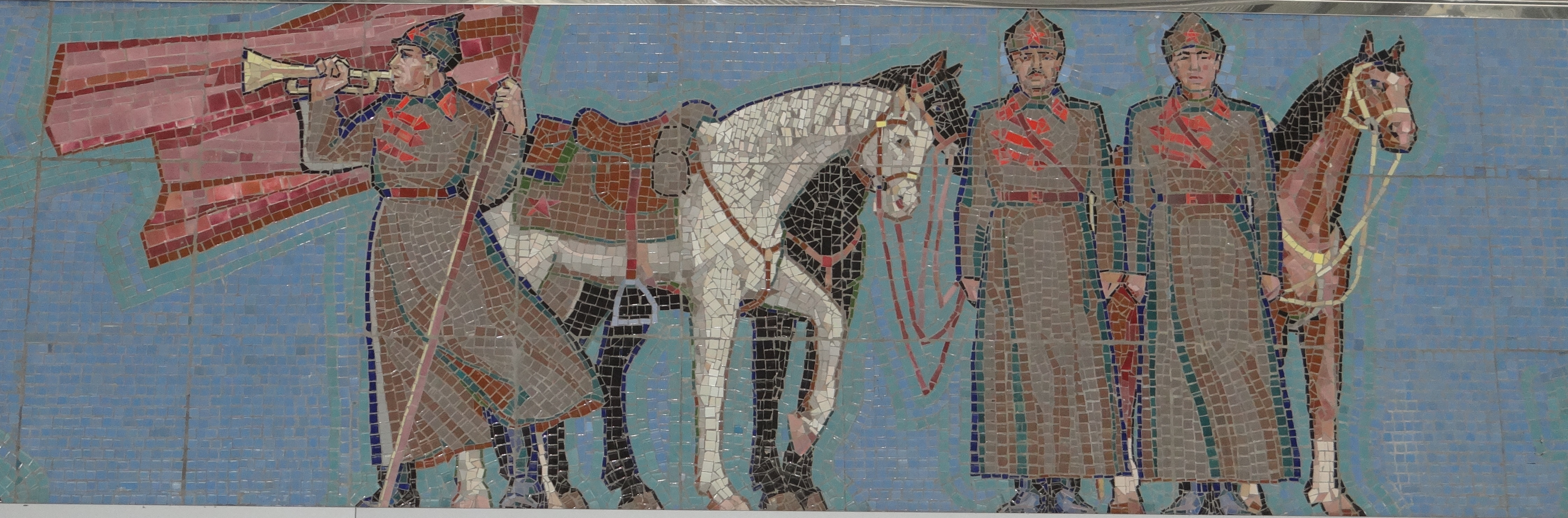
Detail of Arnautoff's mural for the Mariupol International Airport

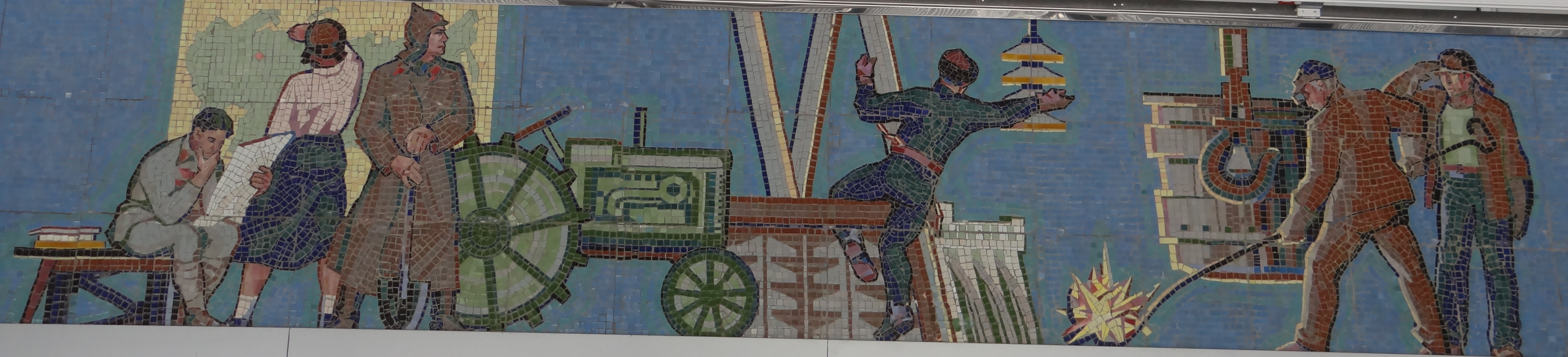
Detail of Arnautoff's mural for the Mariupol International Airport

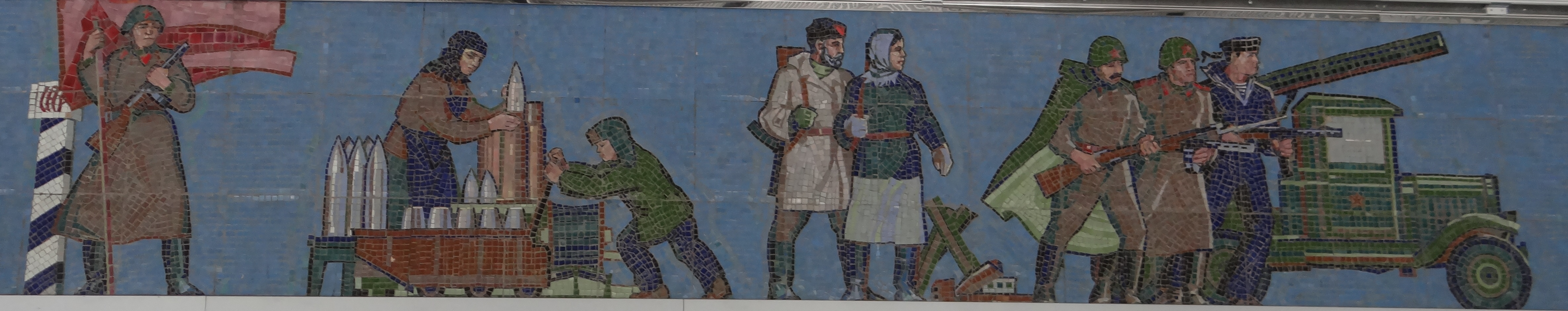
Detail of Arnautoff's mural for the Mariupol International Airport

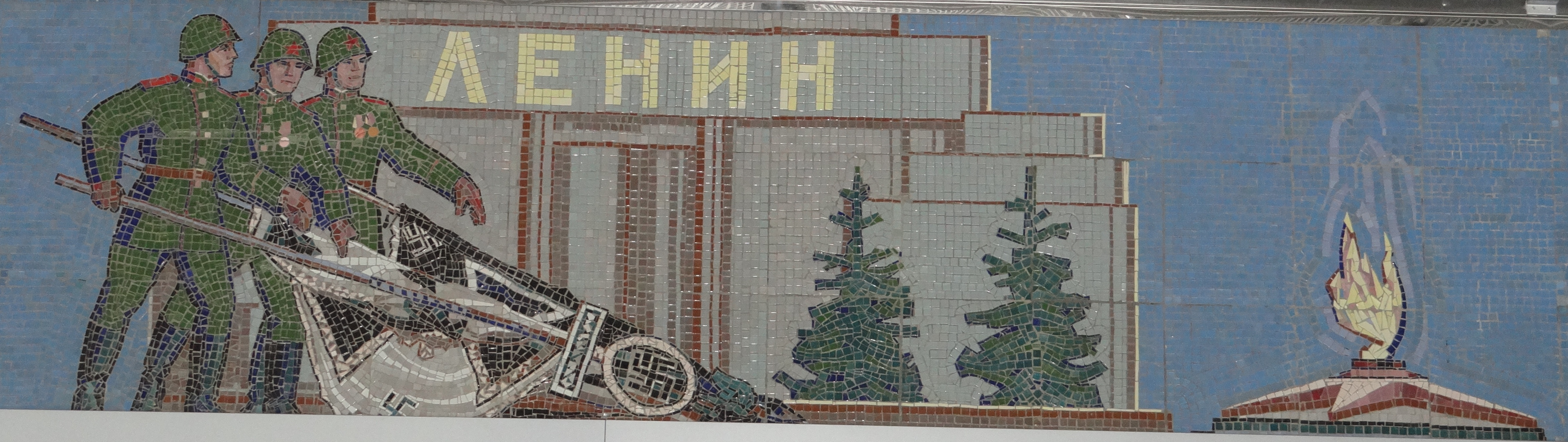
Detail of Arnautoff's mural for the Mariupol International Airport

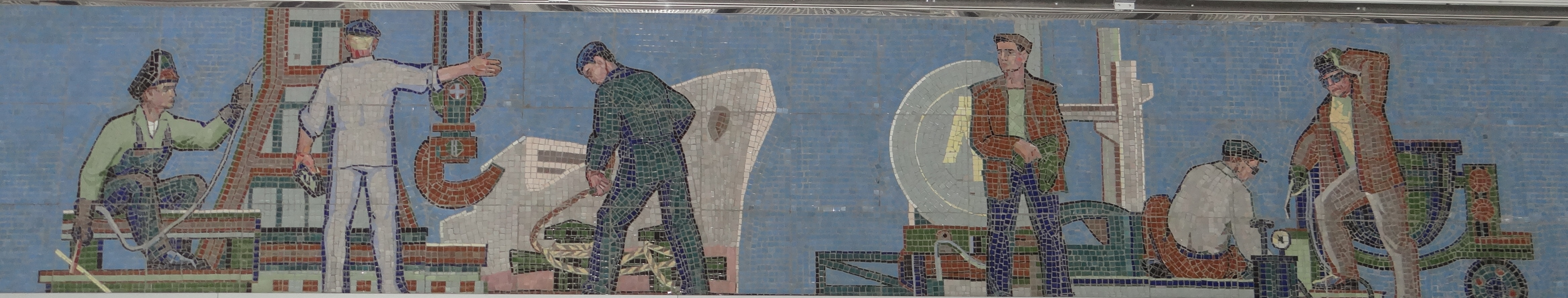
Detail of Arnautoff's mural for the Mariupol International Airport

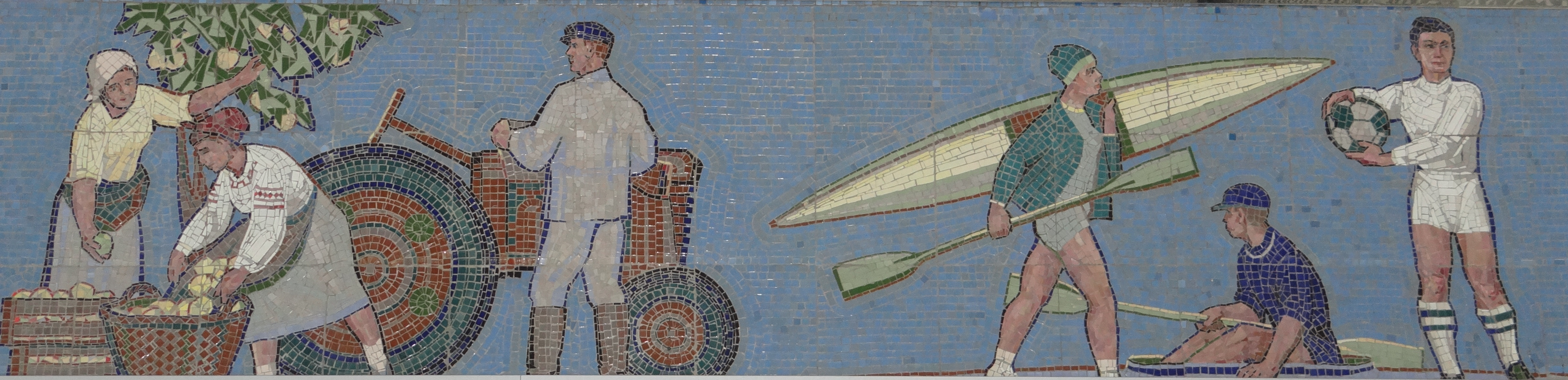
Detail of Arnautoff's mural for the Mariupol International Airport

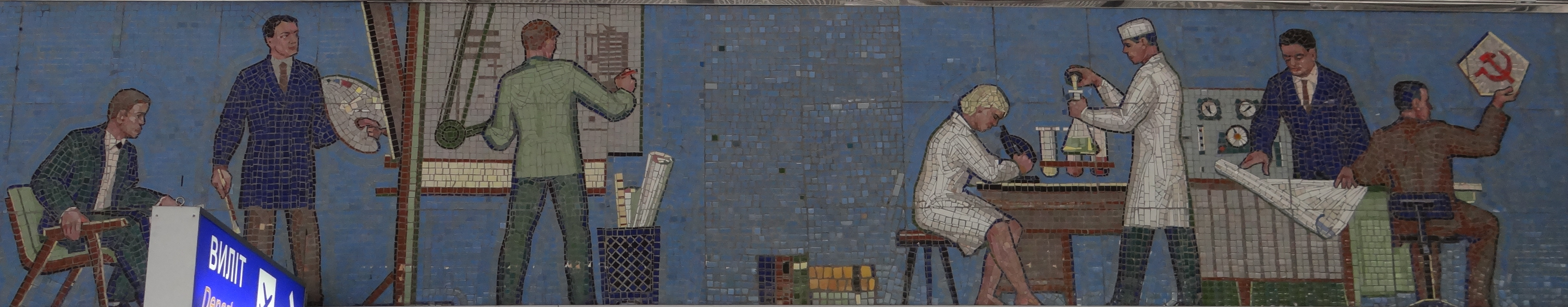
Detail of Arnautoff's mural for the Mariupol International Airport

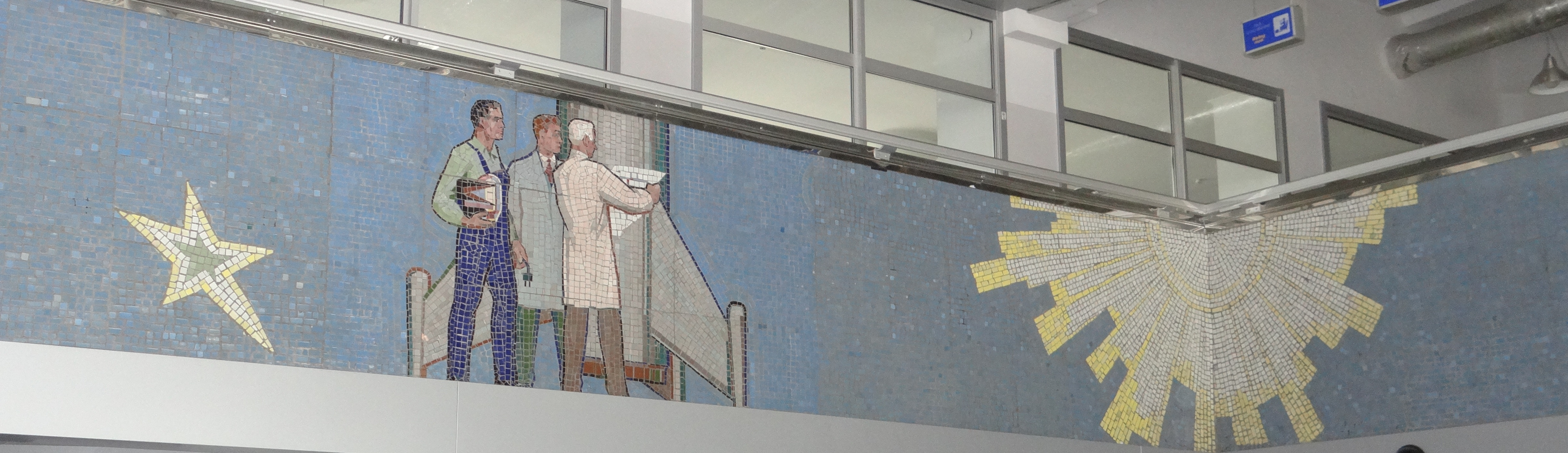
Detail of Arnautoff's mural for the Mariupol International Airport

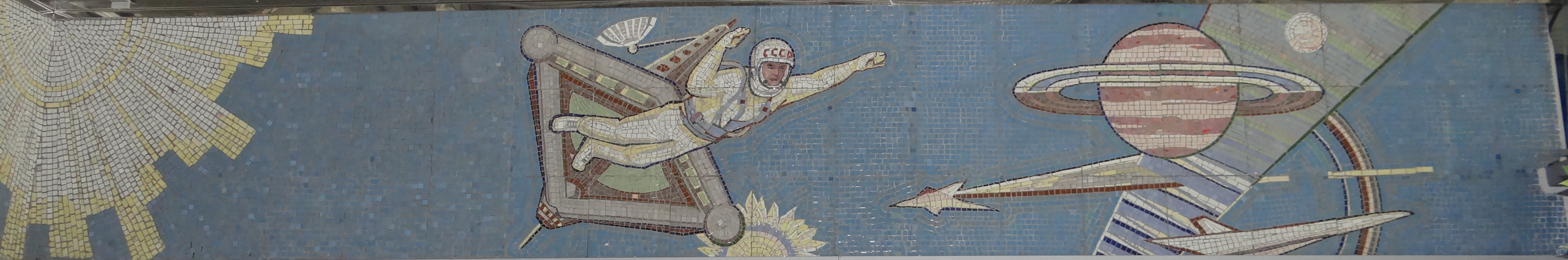
Detail of Arnautoff's mural for the Mariupol International Airport
