= Illich-Avia =

Illich-Avia Ілліч-Авіа
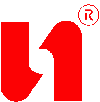
IATA	ICAO	Call sign
-	ILL	ILLICHAVIA
- Founded: 2002
- Hubs: Mariupol International Airport
- Fleet size: 3
- Destinations: 6
- Parent company: Illich Steel & Iron Works
- Headquarters: Mariupol, Ukraine
- Key people: Volodymyr Miroshnychenko Volodymyr Udakov
- Website: ilyich-avia.com.ua

Illich-Avia (Ukrainian: Ілліч-Авіа) was a Ukrainian airline part of the Open Joint Stock Company (JSC) of Illich Iron and Steel Works of Mariupol and was founded in 2002. It was based at Mariupol International Airport and operated domestic and international flights, most of them on behalf of its parent Illich Steel & Iron Works.

== History ==
Illich-Avia Avia was launched in 2002. It held operator certificate No. 198 issued by the State Aviation Administration of Ukraine on 1 June 2005, Air Carrier License No. 118481 of 4 March 2005. The airline was unique as it is one of the few operators of the Antonov An-140. Illich-Avia meanwhile ceased operations.

== Destinations ==
Ilyich-Avia served the following destinations:

Greece

- Athens - (Athens International Airport)
- Thessaloniki - (Thessaloniki International Airport)

Russia

- Moscow - (Vnukovo Airport)

Ukraine

- Kyiv - (Kyiv International Airport)
- Kryvyi Rih - Kryvyi Rih International Airport
- Mariupol - (Mariupol International Airport) base

== Fleet ==
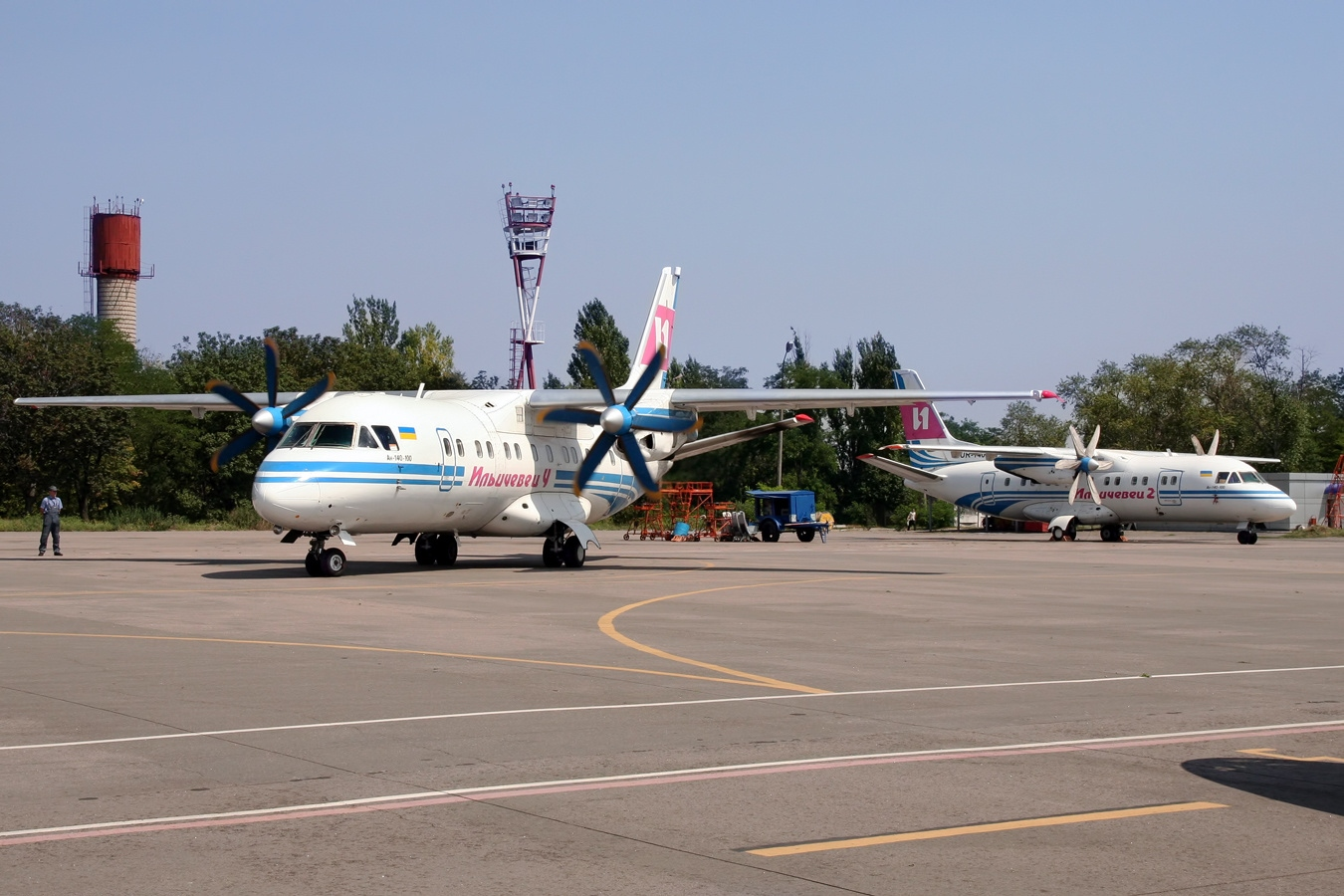
Both Illich-Avia Antonov An-140-100s

The Illich-Avia fleet included the following aircraft (as of August 2011):

Illich-Avia Fleet
Aircraft	In Fleet	Orders	Seats	Notes
Antonov An-140-100	2	—	52	
Antonov An-148	—	2	TBA	
Yakovlev Yak-40	1	—	13	VIP configuration
Total	3	2		
