= Illich Steel and Iron Works =

Metallurgical facility in Mariupol, Ukraine

Coordinates: 47°08′51″N 37°34′33″E

Illich Iron & Steel Works

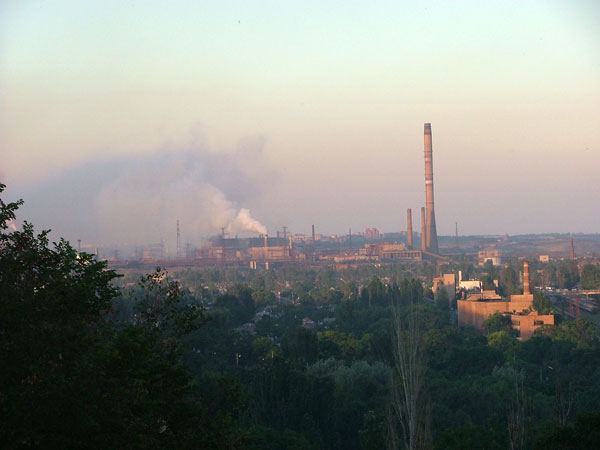
- Native name: Маріупольський металургійний комбінат імені Ілліча
- Company type: Joint Stock Company
- Industry: Metallurgical
- Founded: 1897
- Headquarters: Mariupol, Ukraine
- Key people: Volodymyr Boyko (CEO)
- Products: See products
- Revenue: ▲2.5 billion € (▲15%)
- Net income: ▲200 million € (▲44%)
- Number of employees: 14,000 (2022)
- Website: ilyich.com.ua

Illich Iron & Steel Works (Ukrainian: Маріупольський металургійний комбінат і́мені Ілліча́, lit. 'Mariupol Metallurgical Plant named after Illich') is the second largest metallurgical enterprise in Ukraine, after Kryvorizhstal. It is located in Mariupol. According to NPR, the company had a workforce of 14,000 in early 2022.

The works produce a wide assortment of hot-rolled and cold-rolled steel, including for shipbuilding, oil pipeline, boring gas pipeline and water pipes. The company is the sole enterprise of Ukraine that produces galvanized steel and tanks for liquid gases.

The products of the company are certified by international classification societies: the Lloyd's Register (Great Britain, Germany), U.S. Bureau of Naval Personnel, the Marine register of navigation (Russia), the German certification center TTSU, etc. The company exports the products to more than 50 countries of the world.

== History ==
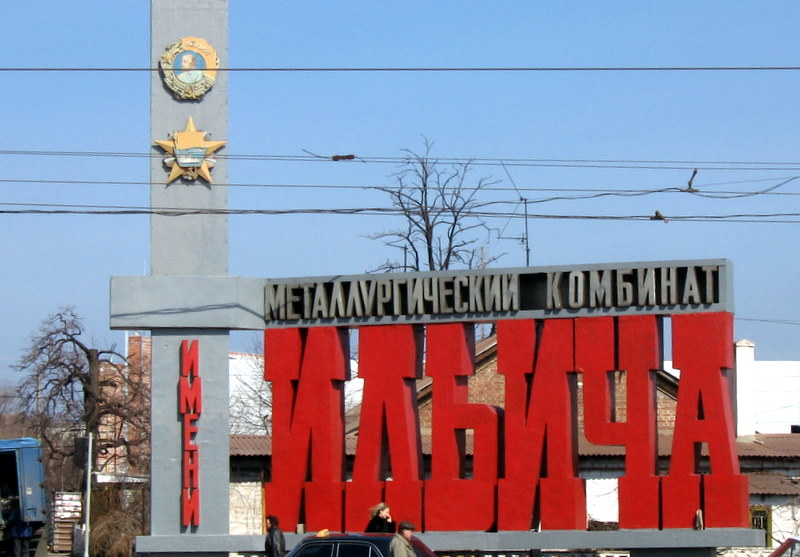
Illich Steel & Iron Works sign

On April 19, 1896, the Americans Rothstein and Smith were given permission from the Russian government to establish the Nikopol-Mariupol Mining and Metallurgical Society. The year 1897 is considered the year of establishment of today's Illich Mariupol steel and iron works, when in Mariupol was mounted and gave out the first products pipe workshop of Nikopol-Mariupol mining- metallurgical society.

The location of the factory in Mariupol was advantageous from a geographical position due to the proximity of raw materials and fuel resources, presence of the marine auction port and labor force of peasants from the nearby villages. The factory broadened in the beginning the twentieth age to become a major metallurgical enterprise in the South of Russia.

It is finally picked up thread after World War I and the Civil War in 1927, the factory began to develop as a comprehensive machine-building enterprise. The factory received its modern name in the 1920s when the Petrograd sovnarkom confiscated all of the property from the previous owners during the nationalization of all the industry in the region and to commemorate the leader of the October Revolution, Vladimir Lenin. Later its powers of operating productions were broadened and new subdivisions were built: new-pipe, thick-sheet, sheet-finishing workshops, a number of other workshops.

In 1941, the enterprise passes to the issue of defensive types of products, including armor plating for the tank T-34, production of which was mastered at the plant before World War II. During the war, the most valuable equipment was dismantled and it was sent on to the factories in the Urals and Siberia, and the blast-furnace and martin stoves were put out of action. After the liberation of Mariupol at the end of 1944, the plant only had 70% of its production power, but it almost immediately started shipping armored steel to the war front.

Between 1954–1969 the company experienced its second birth. The reconstruction of the high furnaces was conducted at this time; three more high furnaces were built, as long as a martin workshop with the highest number of stoves in the world, an oxygen-converter workshop, squeezing-steel workshop 1150, workshops for hot and cold rolling, an agglomerative factory (the largest in Europe) and a complex of workshops for auxiliary production. The first products in 1983 – strips for production of large diameter pipes – brought a thick-sheet workshop 3000, one of the most modern in Europe.

The company got the powerful impulse of development in the last decade. The enterprise built several new facilities, including an electric-welded pipe and limekiln department, two machines for continuous casting of purveyances, setting for the complex lapping of steel and energetic block in a converter to the workshop, modernisation and reconstruction of equipment is conducted in most base workshops.

An important event in the history of the enterprise took place in November 2000, when the Ukrainian Parliament passed the Act "About the features of privatisation of JSC "Illich Mariupol iron and steel works", according to which the collective got the right to count itself the proprietor of the enterprise.

Before 2016, the plant was named after communist leader Vladimir Ilyich Lenin. On 25 April 2016 due to decommunization laws in Ukraine it was "renamed" in honour of scientist Zot Illich Nekrasov, so it is still called the Illich Mariupol Metallurgical Plant. Due to the change in name attribution, Mariupol citizens started to call it "Plant after not-that-Illich".

In March 2022, the plant was severely damaged during the siege of Mariupol during the Russian invasion of Ukraine. Russian forces stormed the plant on April 13.

=== Renewed production (2023–present) ===
At the end of 2022, the newly formed and registered OOO "MMK Ilyicha" listed among its founders a 25-year-old official from Chechnya with ties to Ramzan Kadyrov named Valid Korchagin, whose stake amounts to five million rubles. The second founder was Yuri Alexandrovich Murai. In October 2023, the Illich Iron and Steel Works resumed its production after restoration process. It has shipped nearly 130,000 tons of processed slag since resuming production: 60,863 tons in 2023 and in 2024, 68,279 tons. In December 2023, the regional Ministry of Economic Development announced an investment project to restore the slag processing shop and two electric welding pipe shops at the plant.

== Awards ==
The enterprise has received the following awards:

- Order of Lenin (awarded on June 7, 1947) - For outstanding service to the Motherland in the production of railway tank cars and the creation of armor steel for the T-34 tank
- Order of the October Revolution (awarded on February 12, 1971) - For the great successes achieved by the plant's workers in fulfilling the tasks of the five-year plan to increase metal production and improve the organization of production
- "Golden Globe" – for competitive and high-quality products
- "Golden Mercurius" – for high progress in the export of products, for participation in the development of the economy of the country
- "Golden Scythian" – for creation of new workplaces

== Structural subdivisions ==
- Metallurgical subdivisions
  - agglofactory (the largest in Europe)
  - blast-furnace shop
  - converter workshop
  - open-hearth shop
  - limekiln department
  - flat rolling mill 1150
  - flatting-mill 1700
  - flatting-mill 3000
  - flatting-mill 4500
  - cold-finished products workshop
  - electric-welded pipe mill
  - tube mill
  - balloon workshop
- metallurgical-chemical factory (urban village Donske of Volnovakha district), makes ferroalloys, silicon monocrystalline and other
- mining subdivisions
  - Komsomolske lime-mine
  - Druzhkivka mine
- Machine-building subsections
  - "Umanfermmash" (Uman Cherkasy Oblast)
- Transport subdivisions
  - Railway department
  - Motor department
  - the airport "Mariupol"
  - Airline "Illich-Avia"
- Management of public food consumption and trade
  - 50 points of retail business, cafes, bars, restaurants
  - plot of processing of meat
  - plot of processing of milk and soft drinks (Mariupol milk plant)
  - plot of processing of fish (Mariupol fish cannery)
  - factory of pastry wares
  - vegetable base and other
- The pharmacy network "Illich-Farm"
- Agricultural complex
  - more than 50 agricultural departments (former collective farms of south of the Donetsk and Zaporizhzhia regions)
  - management of agricultural complex
- Workshops of commodities of folk consumption and arts and crafts
- Financial-insurance establishments
  - the insurance company "Illichivska"
- Informative center of combine
  - Mariupol city television (MTV)
  - the "Illichivets newspaper"
- Build organizations
- Sporting organizations
  - Waterpolo Team "WT Mariupol "
  - Football team "FC Mariupol"
  - Volodymyr Boiko Stadium
  - The volleyball club "Ilyichevets"
- Cultural organizations
  - The Metallurgov recreation centre is a great hall in the town
  - public establishments (women, youth, advice of Chernobyl rescuers and other)
- Social establishments
  - medical center
  - child's out-of-school and preschool establishments
  - health resort hotels (including on the South shore of Crimea)
  - child's sanatoriums and other.

== See also ==
- List of steel producers
- Economy of Ukraine
- Metallurgy of Ukraine
