= Bernard Zakheim =

American muralist (1898–1985)

Bernard Baruch Zakheim
- Zakheim during the painting of the Coit Tower murals, 1934, by Peter Stackpole
- Born: April 4, 1898; Warsaw, Russian Empire (now in Poland)
- Died: November 28, 1985 (aged 87); San Francisco, California, U.S.
- Other name: Bernard Boruch Zakheim
- Known for: muralist, sculptor
- Notable work: "The Library", Coit Tower
- Website: bernardzakheim.com

Bernard Baruch Zakheim (April 4, 1898 – November 28, 1985) was a Warsaw-born San Francisco muralist, best known for his work on the Coit Tower murals.

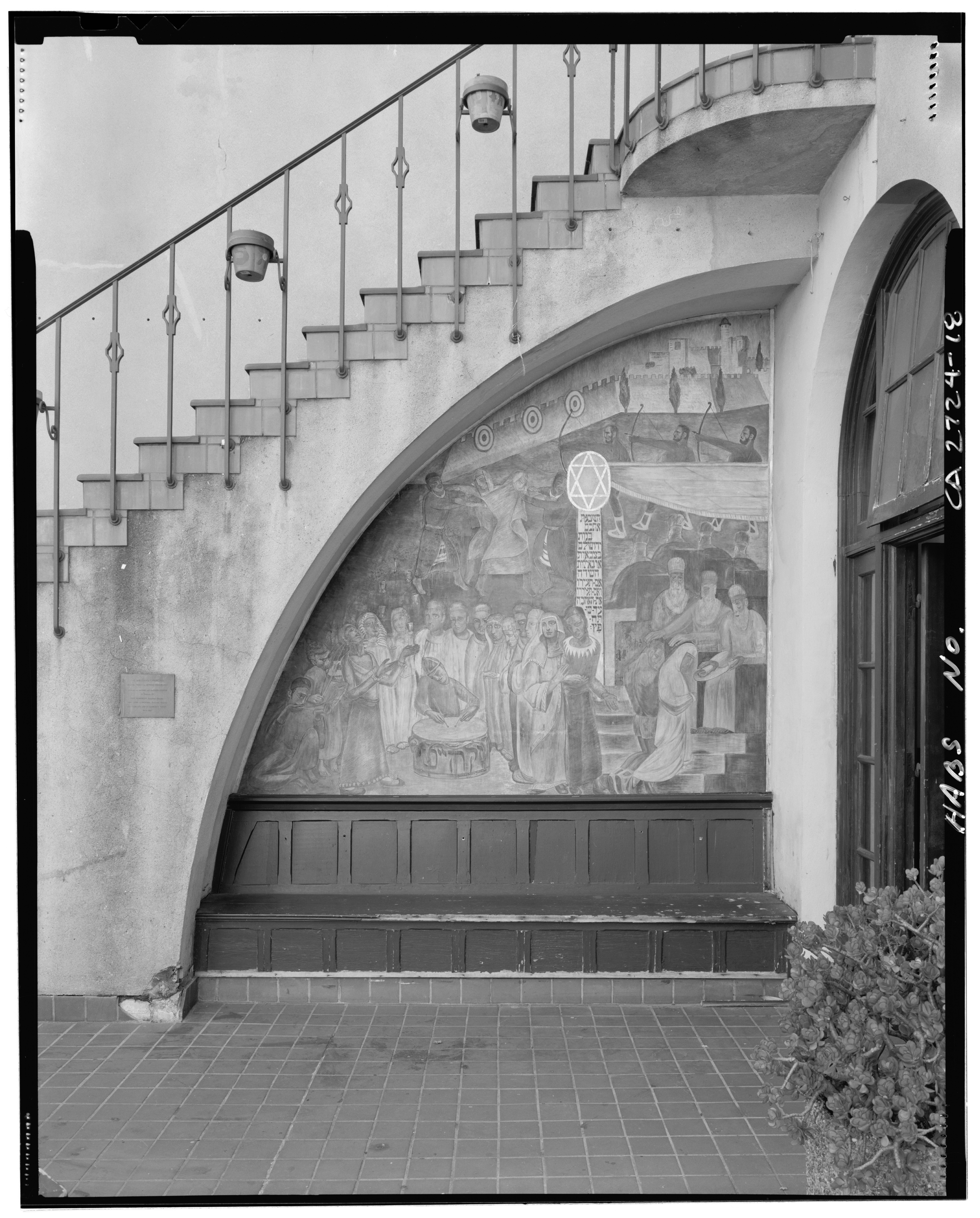
"The Wedding Ceremony" (1933) at the Jewish Community Center of San Francisco.

== Early life and immigration ==
Zakheim was born to a Hasidic Jewish family in Warsaw, then part of the Russian Empire. At the age of 13, he expressed his desire to become an artist and to work with his hands, rather than to continue his religious training as a rabbi. His mother objected, and as a compromise, Zakheim was sent to a technical training school to become a furniture designer and upholsterer. However, he did not actually give up on his artistic goal; he studied watercolor art privately and then was awarded a scholarship to the Polish National Academy of Fine Art, where he studied drawing, painting, and sculpture.

After fighting in World War I, Zakheim and his wife arrived in San Francisco in 1920, where he lived and worked as a furniture maker in the Fillmore District, then a heavily Jewish neighborhood.

== Career ==
In the early 1930s, he committed himself to the preservation and interpretation of Jewish-American life and culture through the making of art. He was one of the organizers of the Yiddish Folkschule on Steiner Street in San Francisco, where he taught children's art classes, and he organized the first "Yiddish art" exhibit in San Francisco.

Around this time, Zakheim was introduced to the muralist Diego Rivera by Lucretia Van Horn. Turning more seriously to mural painting as a form of expression, he traveled to Mexico, studied with Rivera, and met contemporary San Francisco muralist and fellow Russian Empire émigré Victor Arnautoff. He also traveled to Paris, returning with a more developed portfolio.

Back in San Francisco, in 1933 Zakheim helped found the San Francisco Artists and Writers Union, a group of activist artists. The Union lobbied the national government to create a federally funded arts program during the Great Depression. This program became the Public Works of Art Project and funded Zakheim's work on Coit Tower.

In 1941, Zakheim moved out of the city to the rural-agricultural town of Sebastopol, California, where he taught classes at Pond Farm. He lived on an old apple orchard and continued his work as a painter.

== Personal life ==
Zakheim had a daughter, Masha Zakheim (1932–2014), who became an art historian and published author, specializing in San Francisco murals and works by Diego Rivera. His daughter Ruth Gottstein (born 1922) was portrayed in her father's mural at Coit Tower and was an activist for the restoration of the Coit murals.

Zakheim's son, Nathan Zakheim, has been an expert in mural restoration for most of his career. He was responsible for restoring many important murals, including a WPA-era mural at San Diego State University, one of Edward Biberman's iconic murals, some of his own father's work, and the work of his father's contemporary artist and activist Victor Arnautoff.

== Murals ==
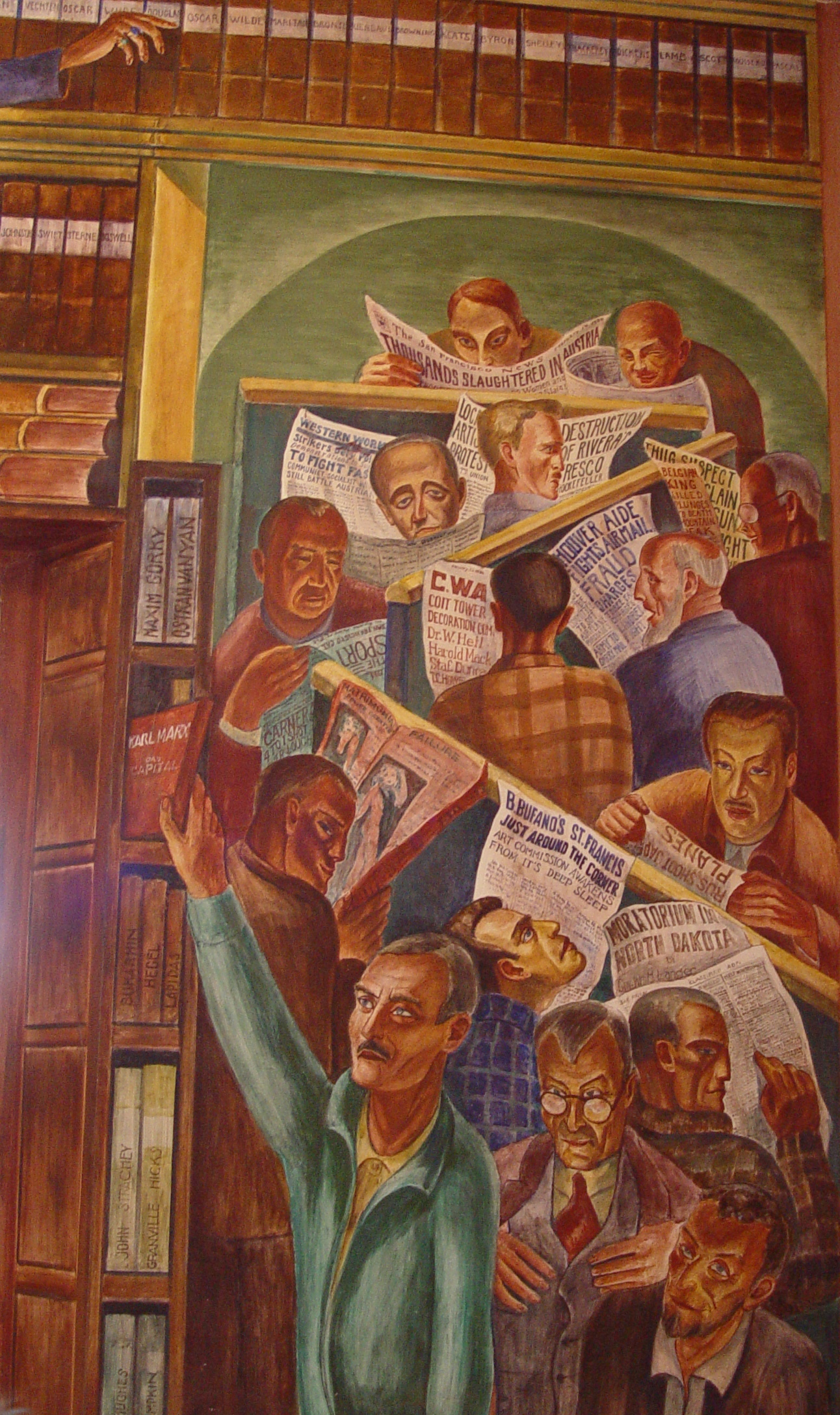
Part of Zakheim's "Library" (1934). The man in green is reaching for a copy of Marx's Das Kapital, while the newspapers have headlines about contemporary art and labor issues.

Contemporaries described Zakheim's style as "bold, clean, and honest". He was considered one of the leading San Francisco muralists of the 1930s, alongside Victor Arnautoff.

=== Coit Tower murals ===
Zakheim conceptualized the Coit Tower murals and, as part of that project, painted the mural "Library," portraying men reading newspapers and books. The work reflects Zakheim's own political orientation, as a then-member of the Communist party. For example, fellow artist John Langley Howard reaches for a copy of Das Kapital. It also reflected specific news events happening at the time—one of the newspaper headlines says "Local Artists Protest Destruction of Rivera's Fresco," referring to the destruction of Diego Rivera's "Man at the Crossroads" the year before. Because of this, the mural caused local controversy, with the San Francisco Examiner publishing a photo of the mural under a hammer and sickle (which was not part of Zakheim's design), leading to a temporary stoppage of work and locking of the building before the murals were eventually allowed to be seen by the public.

=== The History of Medicine in California ===
Over four years in the 1930s, Zakheim painted ten frescoes in Toland Hall Auditorium on the Parnassus campus of the University of California, San Francisco (UCSF), titled "The History of Medicine in California". These received national attention, including a mention in Time magazine. Considered controversial, they were papered over in 1948, and later restored by Zakheim's son Nathan. One of the murals shows Black nurse Biddy Mason working with John Strother Griffin.

In 2021, the murals were removed from the building so that it could be torn down. UCSF is working to identify a new location for display of the murals.

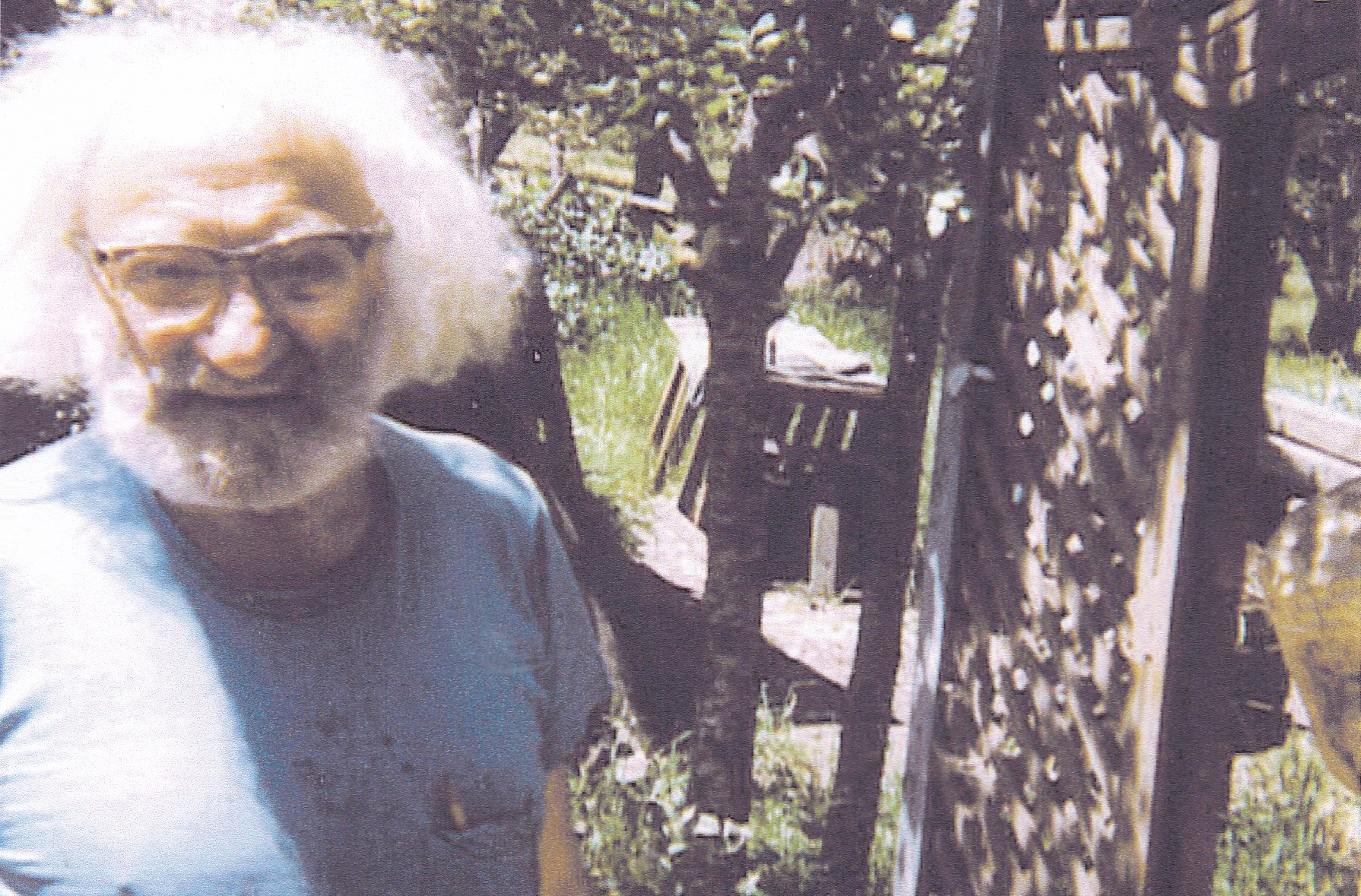
Barnard Zakheim (1975)

=== Other murals ===
In this period he also painted a mural (titled "The Jewish Wedding" or "The Wedding Ceremony") at the San Francisco Jewish Community Center.

Another set of murals was painted at the Alemany Hospital in San Francisco's Outer Mission, built in 1933.

== Sculptures ==
In 1966, Zakheim created six wooden sculptures for one of the first Holocaust memorials in the United States, for 1969 display at the Magnes Collection of Jewish Art and Life in Berkeley. These sculptures are now displayed at Mount Sinai Memorial Park Cemetery in Los Angeles.

== Politics and art ==
Later in life, Zakheim was allegedly rejected for some commissions in part because of his left-leaning politics. However, rather than abandon the political subtexts that informed his art, he advocated that artists should openly espouse their social and religious beliefs within their works. For example, he was a friend of the science fiction author Frank Herbert, and, according to Herbert's biography, he influenced Herbert's work by encouraging him to include political and religious messages in his books.

== Restoration and exhibitions ==
A number of Zakheim's works have been restored since they were painted, including the UCSF and JCC murals referenced above, as well as two Depression-era works in Texas. The Coit Tower murals have also been restored repeatedly.

Two posthumous exhibitions of his work have been held, in 2009 in Los Angeles and in 2010 in San Francisco.
