= Mariupol International Airport =

Mariupol International Airport Міжнародний Aеропорт Маріуполь Международный аэропорт Мариуполь
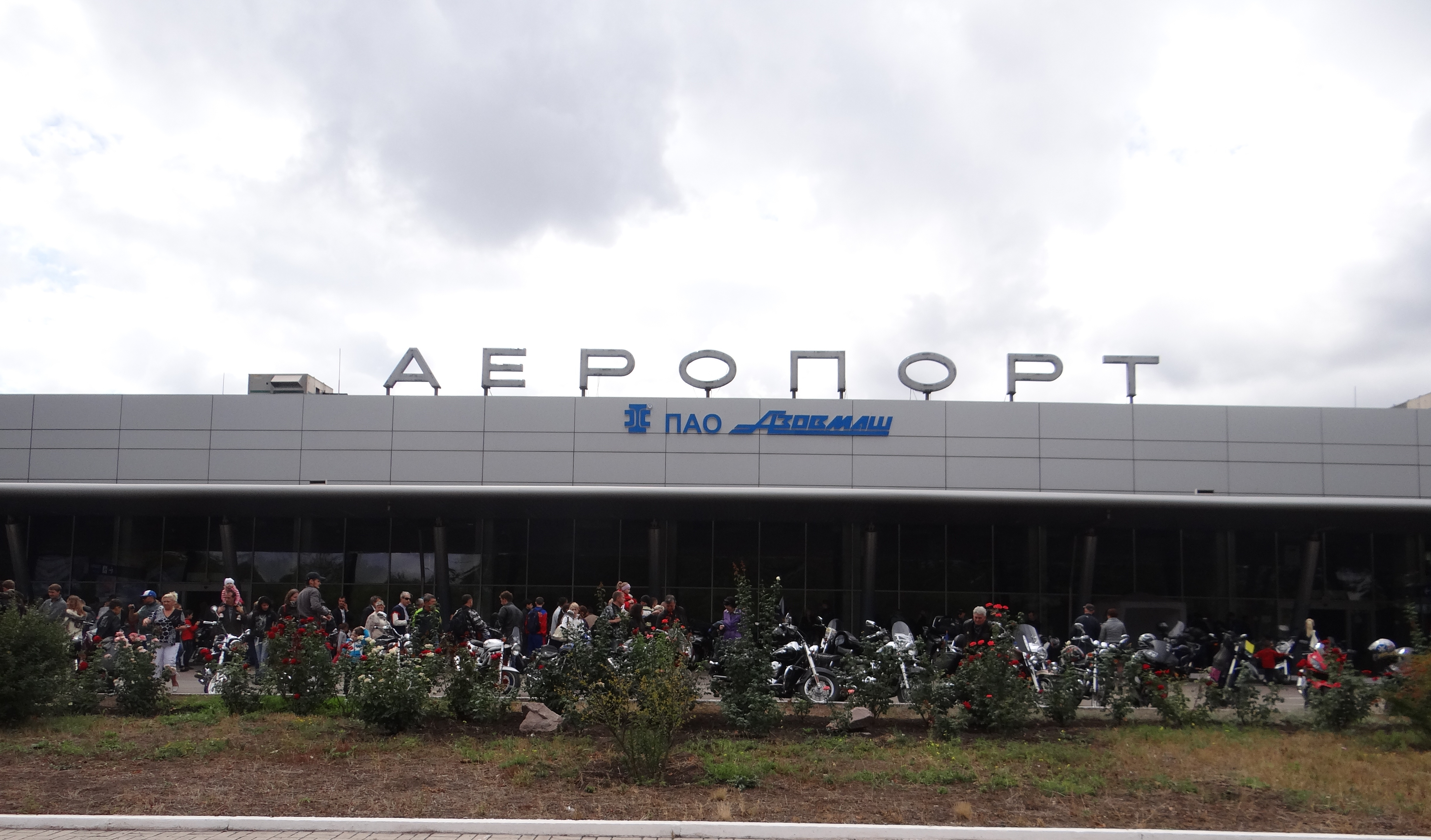
- Mariupol International Airport
- IATA: MPW; ICAO: UKCM

Summary
- Airport type: Public
- Owner: City of Mariupol
- Operator: Ilyich Iron & Steel Works
- Serves: Mariupol
- Location: Mariupol, Donetsk Oblast, Ukraine
- Hub for: Ilyich-Avia
- Elevation AMSL: 251 ft (77 m)
- Coordinates: 47°04′21″N 037°27′23″E
- Website: maraero.com

Maps
- Location of Mariupol Airport in Ukraine
- Interactive map of Mariupol International Airport

Runways
Direction	Length		Surface
Direction	m	ft	Surface
02/20	2,550	8,367	Asphalt
02/20	1,400	4,593	Grass
11/29	1,400	4,593	Grass

Statistics
- Passengers: (closed)

Mariupol International Airport (Ukrainian: Міжнародний аеропорт Маріуполь, Russian: Международный аэропорт Мариуполь, romanized: Mezhdunarodny aeroport Mariupol) (IATA: MPW, ICAO: UKCM), previously known as Zhdanov Airport, is the currently closed main airport of the large, industrial city and port of Mariupol and is located 5km from the city. The airport is situated in the extreme south-eastern part of Ukraine near the border with Russia.

The airport had domestic, international and charter flights. The airport is a Class "B" airfield suitable for the operation of aircraft of all types (categories A, B, C, D, and E).

There have been no regular flights since 2009, and the airport has been closed since 19 June 2014, because of the war in the Donbas region.

== History ==
The airport's history began in 1930 when project Mariupol Airport started (officially named Zhdanov Airport [Жданов Аеропорт] at the time of construction because the city was named Zhdanov until 1989). The first flight was made on a Putilov Stal-3 from Mariupol to Berdyansk in the spring of 1931. However, due to economic problems, the airport was inactive until the autumn of 1932 and did not establish regular flights before the beginning of World War II.

In 1967, the airport underwent new constructions with the runway and the airport terminal. In its heyday (during the Soviet Era), the airport transported up to 120,000 passengers a year. There were 30 to 40 flights a day, and during the summer the airport served up to 25,000 passengers per month. However, after the collapse of the Soviet Union, and the fall of Aeroflot (the airport's primary airline), airline service and passenger travel declined and the airport became inactive. Until 1993, the airport was a member of the Donetsk United Squadron, and on 26 May 1993, Mariupol Airport was registered as a state enterprise.

Construction of a new terminal building which could handle 200+ passengers per hour was launched in February 2003. Also, a new ramp was constructed, and the runway underwent minor repairs with installation of ILS on Runway 20.

In 2004, the airport transported over 11,000 passengers. In 2006, 18,000 passengers were transported, and in 2007 more than 20,000.

On 26 May 2004, the airport received the status of International Airport, and on 7 November 2005, the State Aviation Administration of Ukraine issued the Certificate of Conformity (MCI-00-04-02-01) which allowed the airport to service airlines, passengers, and air cargo.

The airport was closed in June 2014, when Mariupol was engulfed in a fierce fighting between the Ukrainian army and the pro-Russian separatists.

The airport was taken over by Russian forces on March 18, 2022.

== Terminal ==
The terminal includes two departure and arrival lounges along with a baggage claim area which services both domestic and international flights. Airport has a VIP lounge for passengers traveling in business or first class. Terminal is also outfitted with gift and food stalls, a cafe, restaurant, and Wi-Fi.

Between 1968 and 1970 the artist Victor Arnautoff decorated the airport terminal with mosaic friezes.

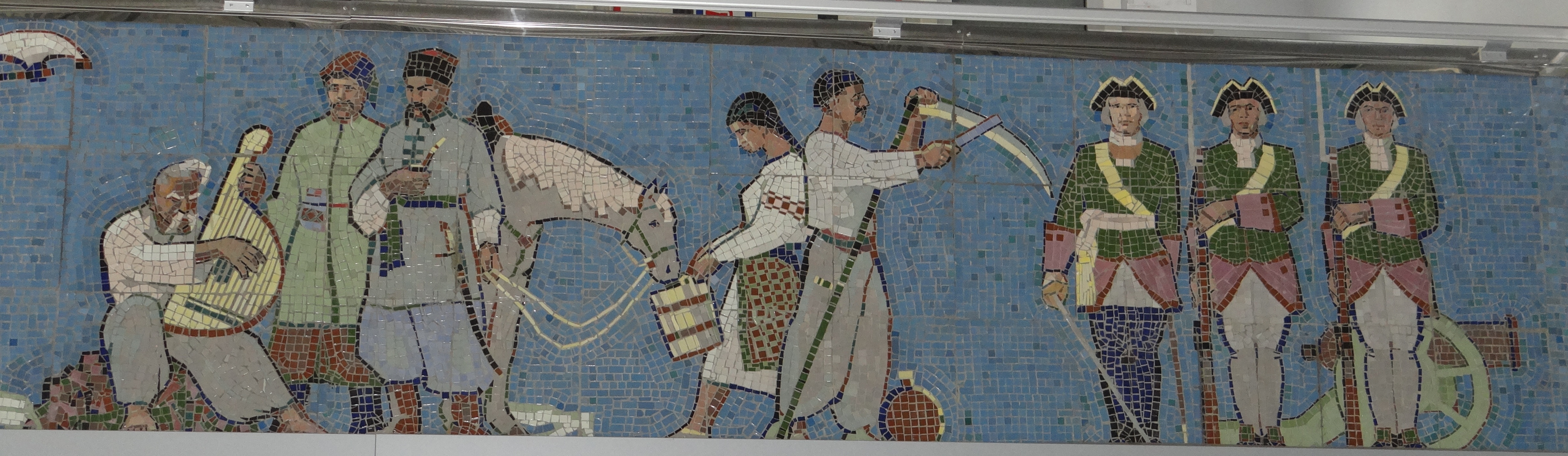
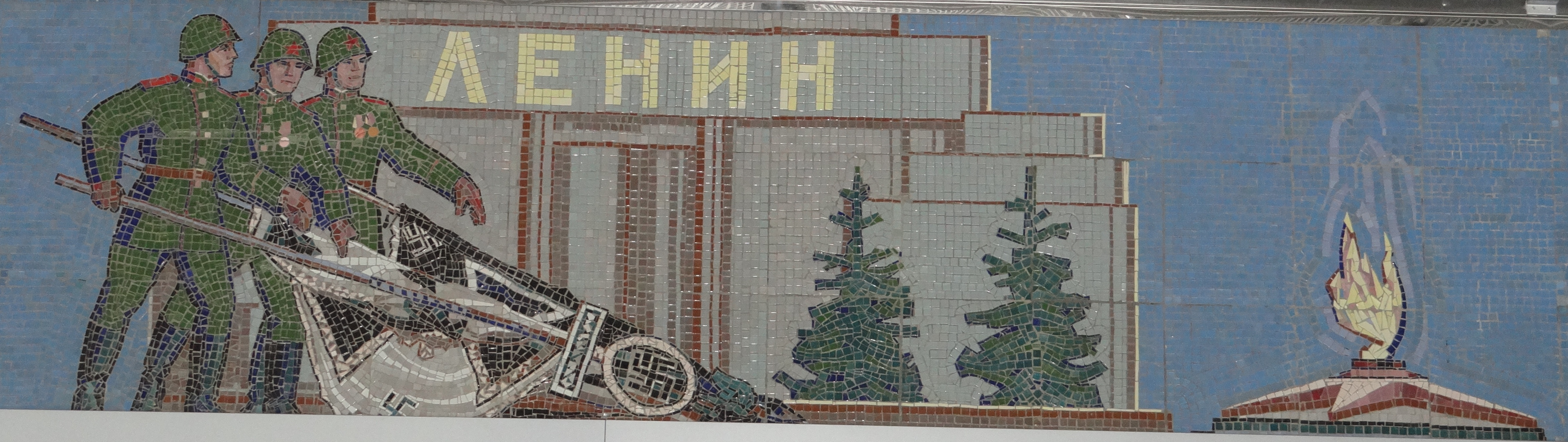

== Incidents and accidents ==
- On 30 March 1977, an Aeroflot Yakovlev 40 (CCCP-87738) flight from Dnipropetrovsk was approaching airport visually in fog. The crew continued their visual approach even after entering an area of fog with visibility less than 500 metres (1,600 ft) and losing sight of the ground. When deciding to go around, the right wing hit a 9-metre-high (30 ft) pole at a height of six metres (20 ft). The wing caught fire, and the number 2 engine failed. With a progressive roll the aircraft flew 420 metres (1,380 ft) at an angle of 40-45 degrees until the right wing touched the ground. The fuselage hit the ground sideways in a field about 1,500 metres (4,900 ft; 1,600 yd) from the runway. The airplane broke up and caught fire. There were 8 fatalities (4 of them were crew) out of 27 occupants. The aircraft was written off (damaged beyond repair).

== See also ==
- List of airports in Ukraine
- List of the busiest airports in Ukraine
