= San Francisco Artists and Writers Union =

The San Francisco Artists and Writers Union was a group of San Francisco artists and writers, formed during the Great Depression.

== History ==
The group first met in late 1933. The group was not formally organized as a union (it did not engage in collective bargaining, in particular) but did help coordinate the provision of workers for various mural and artistic projects throughout the city. In particular, it helped organize San Francisco artists to respond to, and take advantage of, opportunities provided by the Public Works of Art Project and Works Progress Administration. The group's most significant political action was protesting against political interference in art, particularly in reaction to the controversy around Diego Rivera's Rockefeller Center murals and the Coit Tower murals, both in 1934. In the Coit Mural protest, union members picketed for two weeks.

== Members ==
The group was founded by Kenneth Rexroth (a poet) and Bernard Zakheim (a muralist). Other members included Frank Triest, Shirley Triest, and Victor Arnautoff. Total membership was about 350 members.
