= Public Works of Art =

Public Works of Art may refer to:

- Public art
- Public Works of Art Project (PWAP), U.S. government program, 1933–1934
