= Pre-Islamic burial monuments in the Sahara =

Burial monuments in the Sahara

Keyhole Tomb, a landmark in the Algerian Sahara

Pre-Islamic burial monuments in the Sahara are stone witnesses to past cultures. They were constructed with loose stones, stone slabs, and dry stone walls. A tumulus, a rounded stone mound, is often found at their core. The burials are predominantly inhumations in individual graves. In addition to the simple forms of tumuli, there are a number of different configurations and extensions, such as keyhole monuments or tumuli with alignements. They date back approximately 1,000 to 7,500 years and are particularly common in the Central and Western Sahara.

== Distribution ==
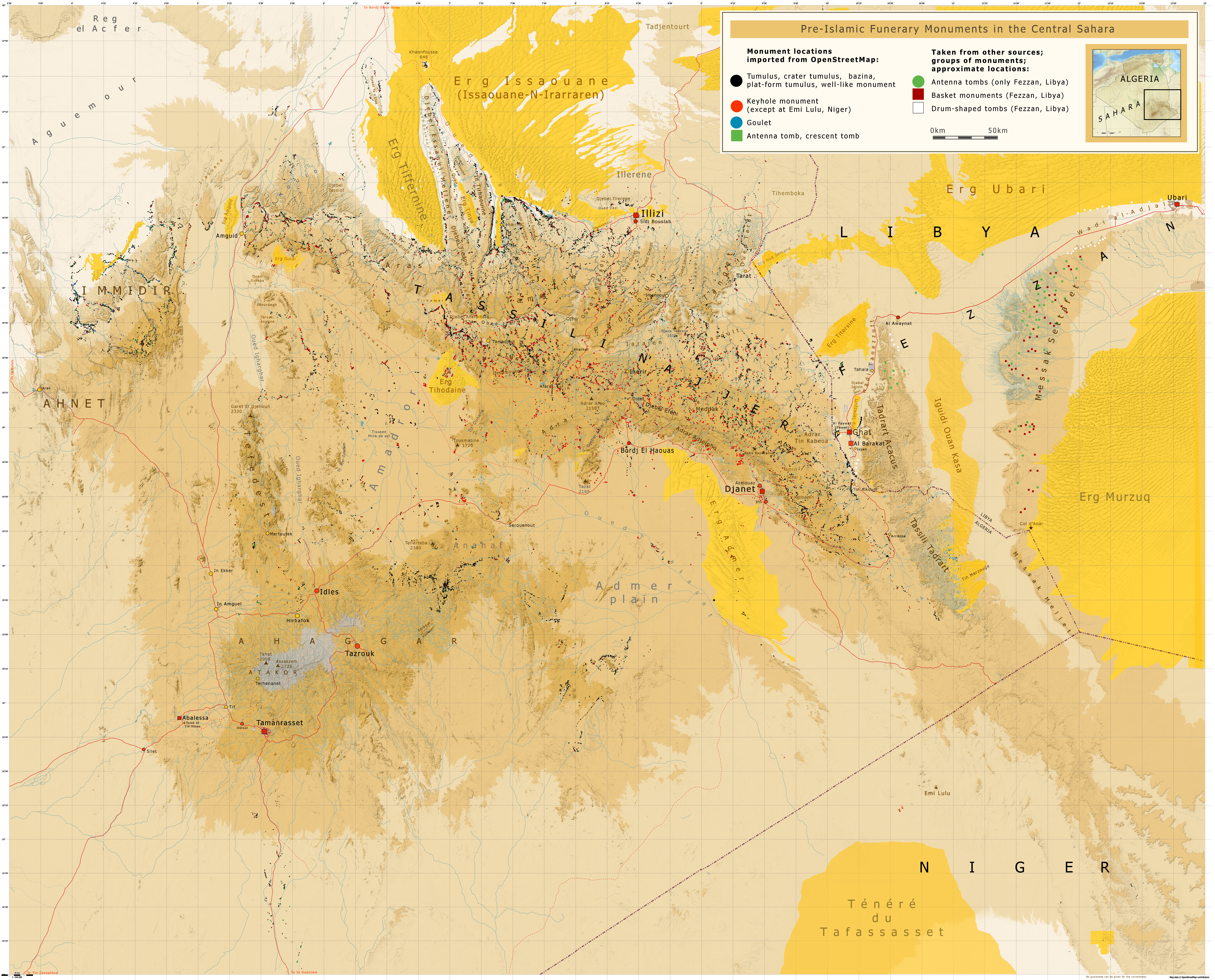
Pre-Islamic burial monuments in the Central Sahara

The Sahara contains hundreds of thousands of burial mounds and flatter burial monuments that come in a wide variety of forms. It is estimated that 95% of these monuments are located between the 16th degree of eastern longitude (east of the Ténéré Desert) and the Atlantic Ocean. They are rarely found in dune areas, though zones of rocky material exist between the dunes. These monuments are usually found in areas with sparse vegetation. As a result, they are clearly visible, even on high-resolution satellite images, so that today at least the larger burial monuments of the Sahara have been mapped by scientists.

== Chronological context ==
The oldest stone monuments in the Sahara are located east and west of the Nile in Nubia and date back to around 7000 BC. These monuments are not yet associated with burials, but rather with ritual practices. Around 5500 BC, as animal husbandry developed, animal graves were covered with stone structures of various shapes and sizes. Around 5000 BC, tumuli and other funerary monuments marking human burials appeared. This tradition is believed to have originated in Nubia and spread rapidly from the eastern edge of the Sahara toward the west. Around 2800 BC, monuments marking animal graves disappeared. Islamic burial customs appeared sporadically beginning in the eighth century AD, but did not become widespread until the 12th century.

Cultural and chronological classification of burial monuments in the Sahara:

Cultural era	Early Bovidian	Late Bovidian	Early Caballine	Late Caballine	Cameline
Grave form	5500 – 4000 BC	4000 – 2200 BC	2200 – 1000 BC	1000 BC – 0	0 – 1000 AD
Tumulus	x (Animal graves)	x x	x x	x x	x x
Basket monument	x x (Animal graves)	x (Animal graves)			
Keyhole monument		x x x			
Crescent tomb		x x x	x		
Plat-form tumulus		x x x	x x		
Goulet		x	x x	x	
Bazina		x	x x	x	x
Ring tumulus			x x	x	
Crater tumulus			x	x x x	x
Drum-shaped tomb				x x x	x x
Antenna tomb				x x	
Tumulus with alignements			x	x	x x
Compass tomb				x	x
Well-like monument					x

== Cultural background ==
Many monuments, especially larger ones, are located in highly visible places, such as the edges of plateaus, hillsides, and low-lying areas, so they can be seen from nearby elevations. Monuments oriented in a particular direction are usually aligned toward the east, toward sunrise or moonrise. There are also monuments that point toward distinctive landscape features on the horizon or toward other monuments. Therefore, their location and placement do not appear to have been chosen at random. The deceased is almost always positioned on the right or left side with bent knees and hands beneath the face, often oriented towards the east. Grave goods are rarely found, except in the Fezzan region of southwestern Libya.

To learn more about the cultural background and living conditions of the builders of these burial monuments, it is helpful to link the individual grave forms to prehistoric rock art created during the same era in the same region. Since sufficient data is often lacking, the correlations listed below are considered plausible by scientists but have not been definitively proven.[

== Socioeconomic aspects ==
The size of a burial monument depends on many factors. One factor that always plays a role is the amount of time and labor required, which is then unavailable for daily work. In the far southeast of the Free Zone of Western Sahara, in the Erg Azefal, there are three burial grounds containing burial monuments up to 5 meters high and 20 meters in diameter. These burial grounds contain dozens of large burial monuments and perhaps hundreds of smaller ones. Building these burial complexes required careful planning and organization of labor and materials. This necessitated a certain degree of social complexity. It also suggests that some individuals may have been accorded higher social status, reflected in the size and complexity of the monuments. A study in Libya points to this as well. In the Fezzan, a large number of skeletal remains beneath burial monuments were examined. Those buried beneath large burial structures showed no biomarkers of stress. This could indicate that these individuals held important social positions.

== Types of burial monuments ==
=== Tumulus ===
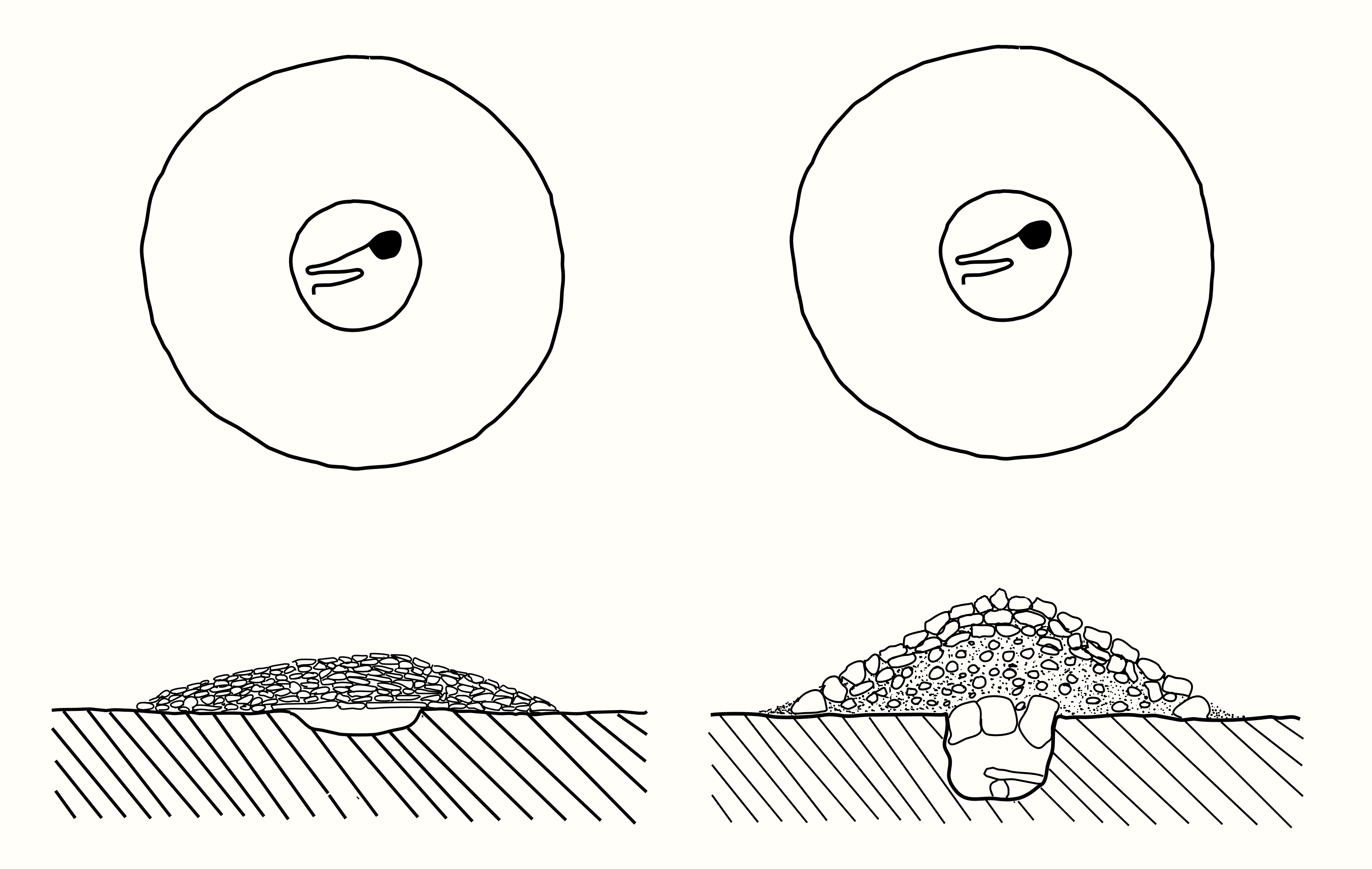
Spherical tumulus and conical tumulus

The tumulus is the simplest and most widespread type of burial monument in the Sahara. Most tumuli are round or slightly oval. They resemble a cone in structure. Others have a more spherical shape, resembling an open umbrella. They range in diameter from two to 15 meters and in height from one to 5 meters. Some contain a pit in which the body was placed, while others were laid directly on the ground. They are protected by a stone chamber. Tumuli are particularly common in the Fezzan, the Tassili n'Ajjer, the Immidir Mountains, and northeastern Hoggar Mountains, as well as the Free Zone of Western Sahara and southeastern Mauritania (in the Sahel). In the eastern Sahara, they have been documented in the Tibesti Mountains and the Ennedi Plateau of Chad. All other types of graves except flat burial monuments contain a tumulus beneath which the remains lie. However, there are also monuments that do not contain a grave.

In the Wadi Tanezzuft in southwestern Libya, small tumuli contain the graves of children. In the highlands of southeastern Mauritania, in the Tichitt region, approximately 9,000 simple tumuli were identified using satellite imagery and classified according to their size. Five burial fields containing about 2,800 tumuli were selected from these, each dating from a different period of the Tichitt tradition. These burial fields are densely covered with tumuli of varying sizes. Assuming the size of a burial mound correlates with the social and economic status of the deceased, the extent of social inequality was determined using the Gini coefficient. Further research is necessary to draw definitive conclusions, but initial insights have been gained.

=== Basket monument ===
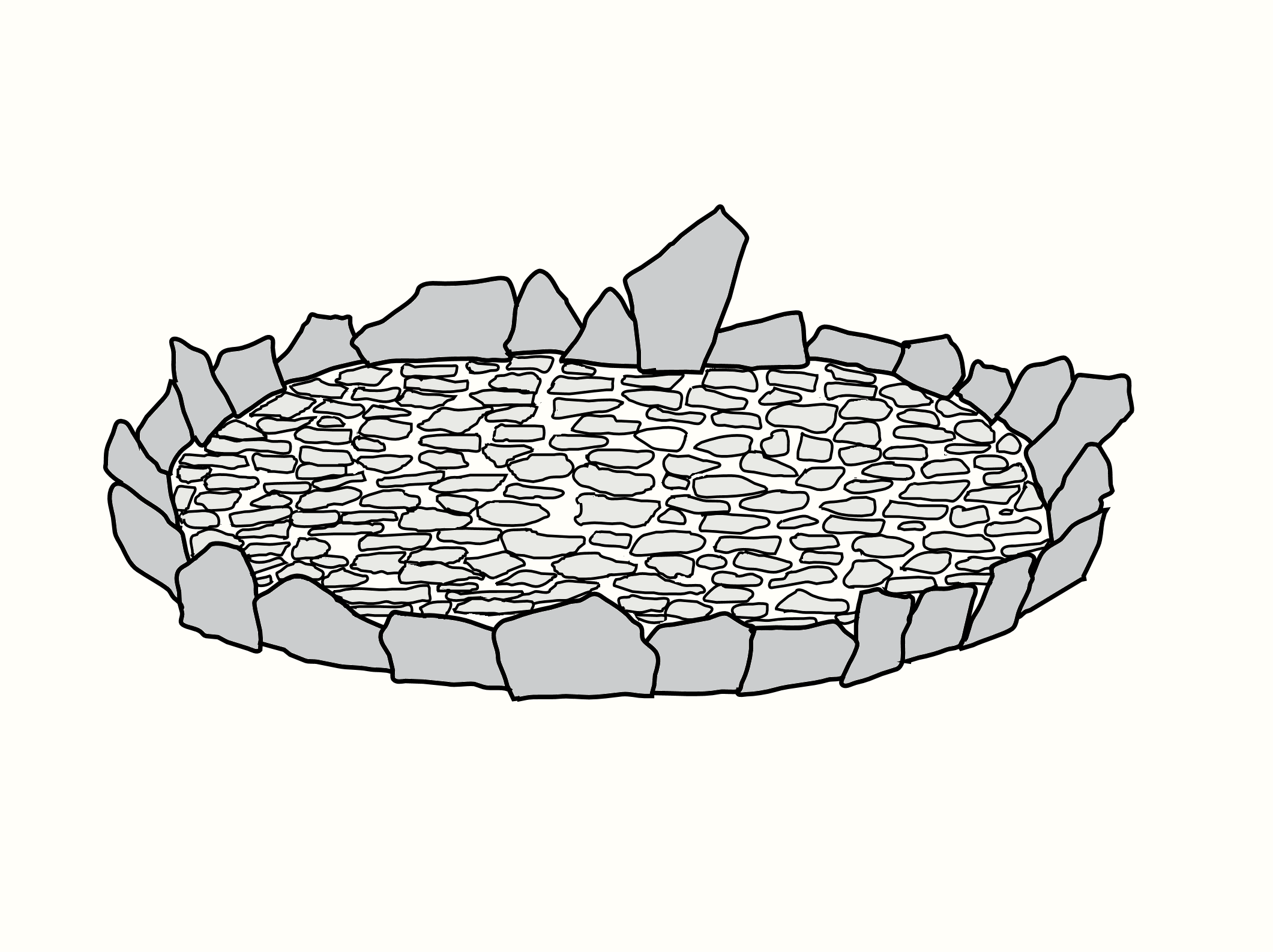
Basket monument

(also called a "corbeille") It is a flat burial monument that is usually round with a diameter ranging from one to 5 meters. Upright or outward-sloping stone slabs are set into the ground at its edge. Sometimes, there are several layers of carefully angled slabs. The interior may be covered with stone slabs or contain one or more upright stelae, some of which are engraved. However, far more complex forms also exist. Some have concentric circles around the basket. Others have radial rows of stones that divide the perimeter into sectors. Some are flanked by small stone circles that are often arranged in a regular pattern. This type of grave is particularly prevalent on the Messak Settafet high plateau in southwestern Libya, where more than 300 have been discovered. The remains of livestock have been found in these graves. This type of burial monument has also been found in Western Sahara.

=== Keyhole monument ===
Due to their size and striking architecture, keyhole monuments are among the most spectacular types of burial monuments in the Sahara. They attest to the importance that the builders attached to funeral rites. Together with the goulets, they are considered the tombs of prominent members of nomadic groups. They are also believed to have served as territorial markers. Keyhole monuments usually stand alone in the landscape and rarely form small necropolises. They also exhibit few variations. This could indicate a widespread, shared burial culture.

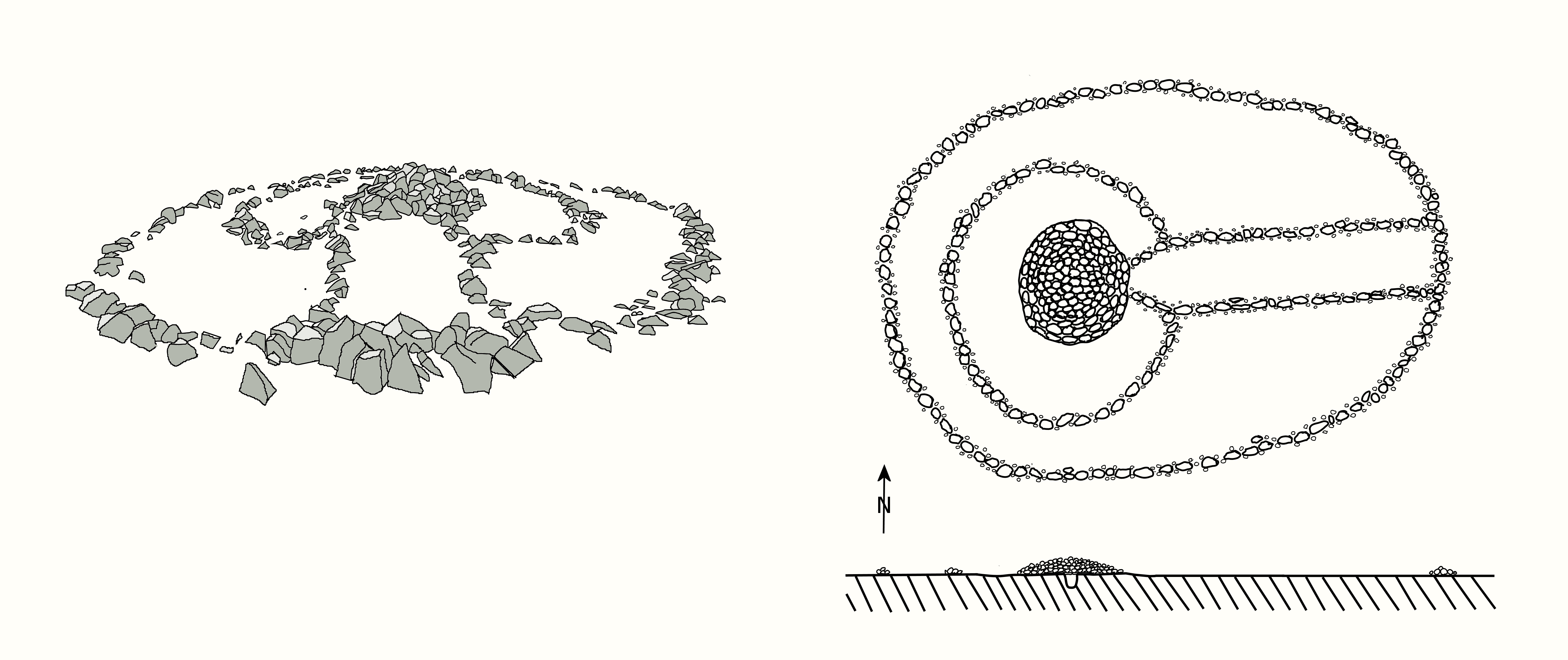
Keyhole monument

Two antenna-like structures extend from the tumulus, forming a passageway which usually faces the sunrise. A circular stone circle surrounds the tumulus, leaving the passageway open. A second, usually oval stone circle encloses the entire complex. The overall shape resembles a keyhole. There are also graves with one or more additional tumuli that were constructed along the enclosure or in its vicinity. It is believed that the passageway was used for ritual purposes. The diameter of the outer enclosure varies from 10 to over 200 meters, though most measure between 15 and 35 meters. The Tassili n'Ajjer is believed to be the origin of this burial type. Most of these tombs are also found there. All of the examined tombs contained the remains of men. The deceased were buried in cramped pits, requiring their legs to be bound. They lay on their right side facing east. No grave goods or jewelry were found within the burial sites. This burial type is distributed westward from the Tassili n'Ajjer to the Immidir Mountains, southward to the Hoggar Massif, and southeastward to the Emi Lulu hill, located south of the Niger-Algeria border.

=== Crescent tomb ===
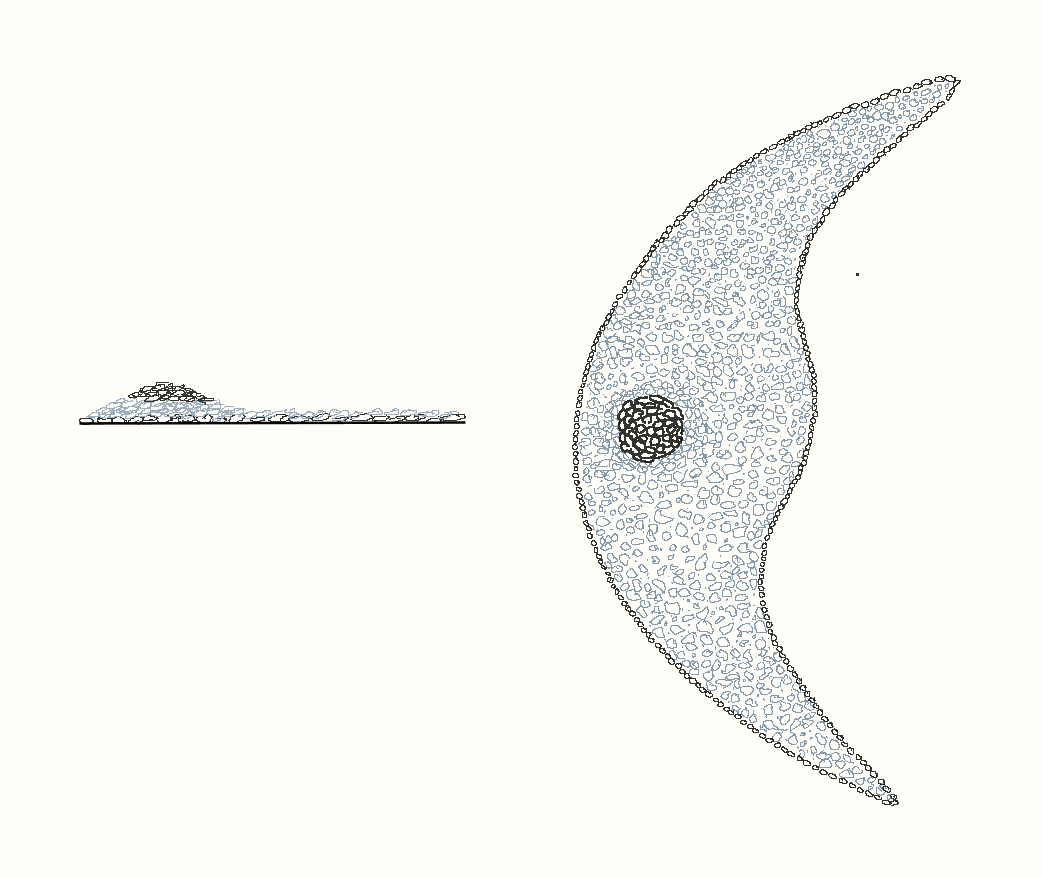
Crescent tomb

This monument resembles a crescent moon with blunt tips. It consists of a platform often framed by small upright stones. A tumulus rises in the center. The span between the two ends of the crescent varies from 11.7 to 38 meters in the four graves surveyed in the Hoggar, and the tumulus is between one and two meters high Orientation toward sunrise is common. This type of grave is the second most common in the Sahara, after the simple tumulus, and it is widespread from the Ténéré to the Atlantic Ocean.

=== Plat-form tumulus ===
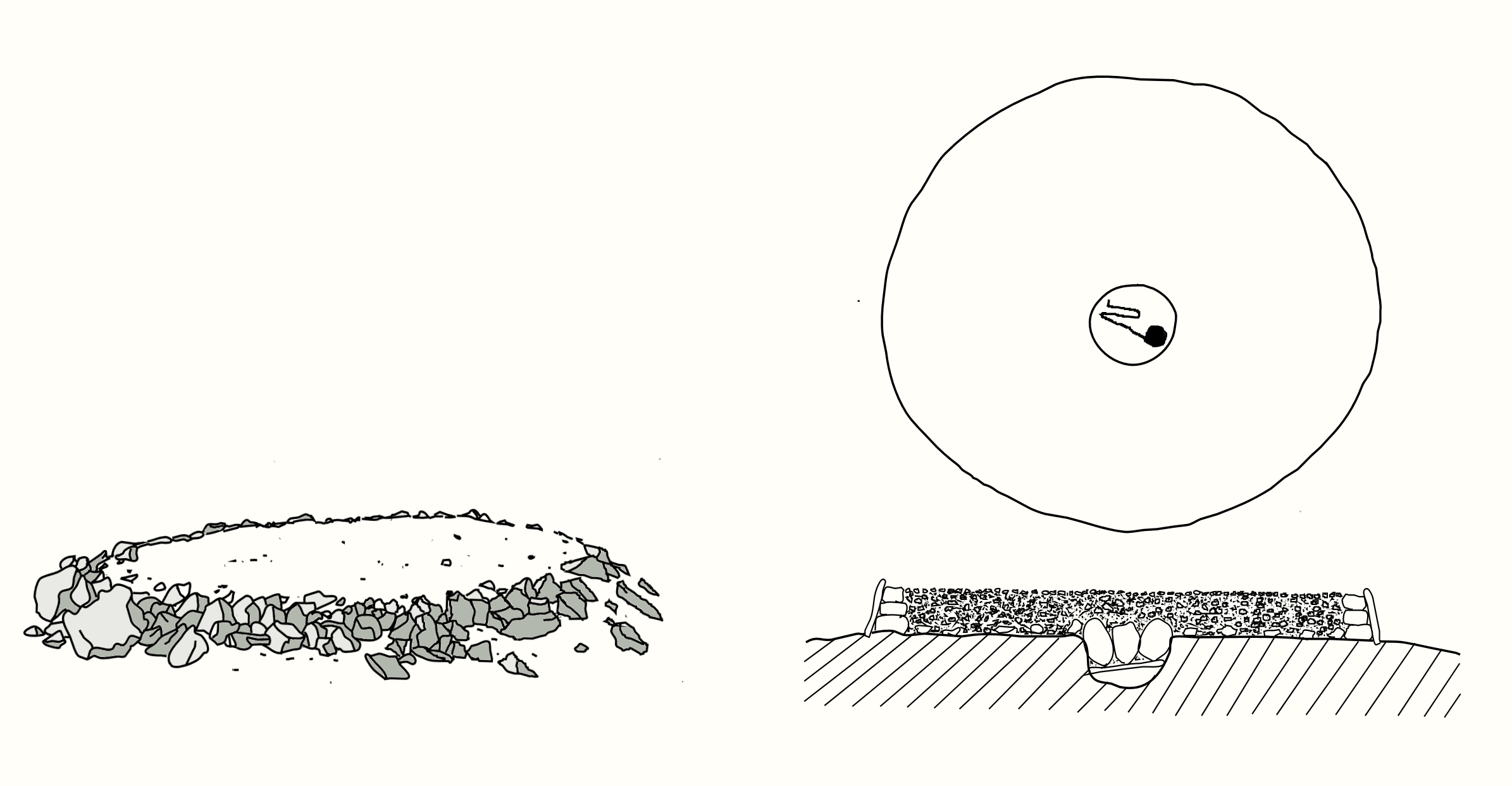
Plat-form tumulus

They rest on a flat base that is sometimes paved with stone slabs. The top is often flat as well, and the floor plan is usually round or oval. This type of tomb has been studied in the Aïr Mountains in Niger. Only the remains of men were found in all of them. Women and children were likely buried in unstructured graves. Two types of these tombs were found: those with simple stone walls and those carefully covered with quartz pebbles. The latter are attributed to more prominent personalities. Platform tumuli are also found in the Fezzan, the Tassili n’Ajjer, and the Hoggar Massif. Large tombs with diameters of up to 24 meters have been found there, while in other locations, the diameter ranges from 3 to 9 meters. There is evidence that circular platforms in the Hoggar may be connected to rock engravings in the Caballin style depicting "flying, galloping horses".

=== Goulet ===
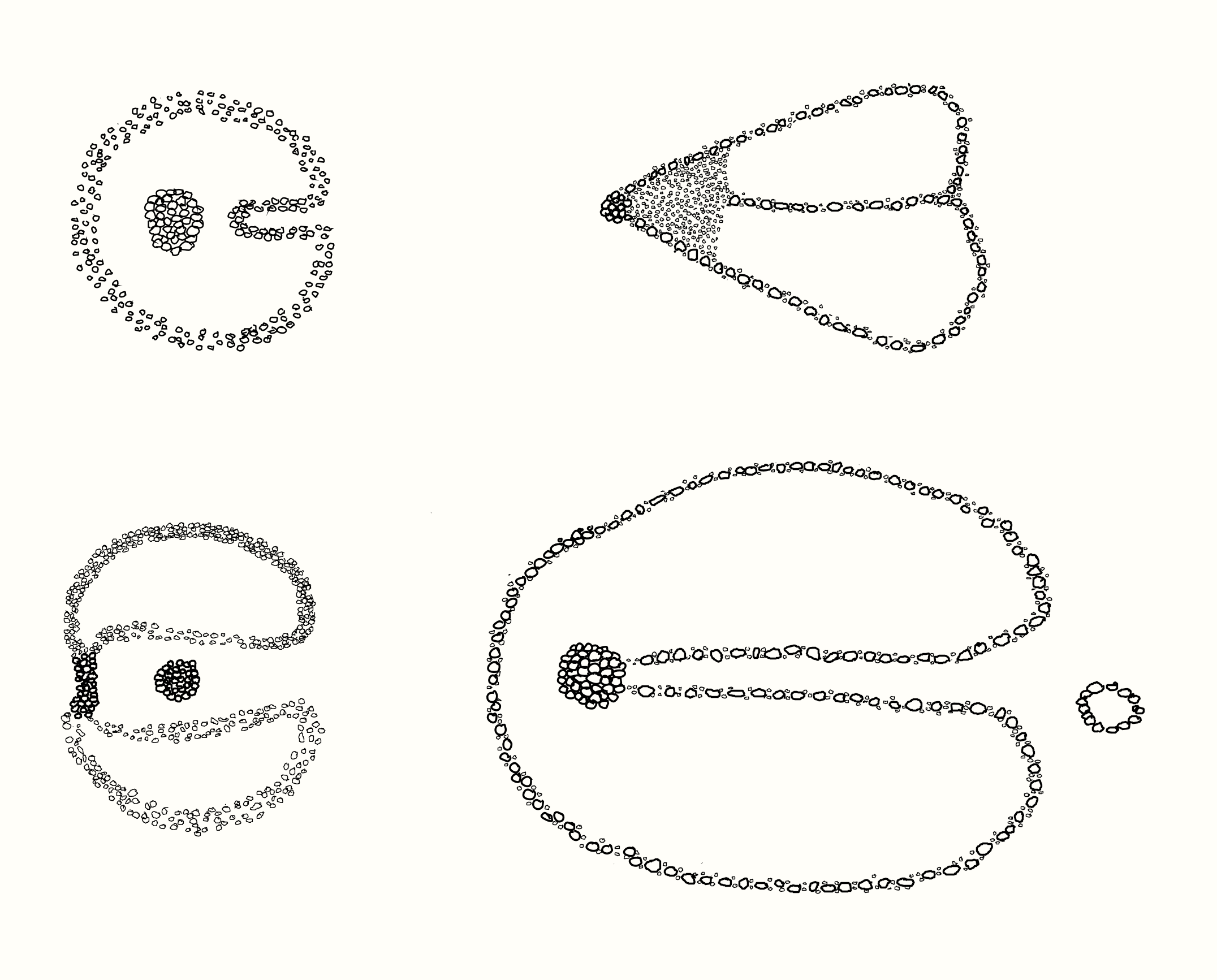
Goulet: Variations in funeral monument form

Its shape resembles that of the keyhole monument. It features a round or oval enclosure and a passageway running along its long axis. The tumulus is typically built in the western half or on the western edge of the grave structure. It consists of loose stones and is usually less than one meter high. The goulet is primarily found in the Tassili n'Ajjer and the Immidir, and it has the same distribution area as the keyhole grave. It may be a further development of the latter. The goulet is also found in western Sahara. There, a variant exists with a simple, straight stone wall instead of a passageway. Reports exist of tombs reaching 50 m and up to 500 m in northern Mauritania.

=== Bazina ===
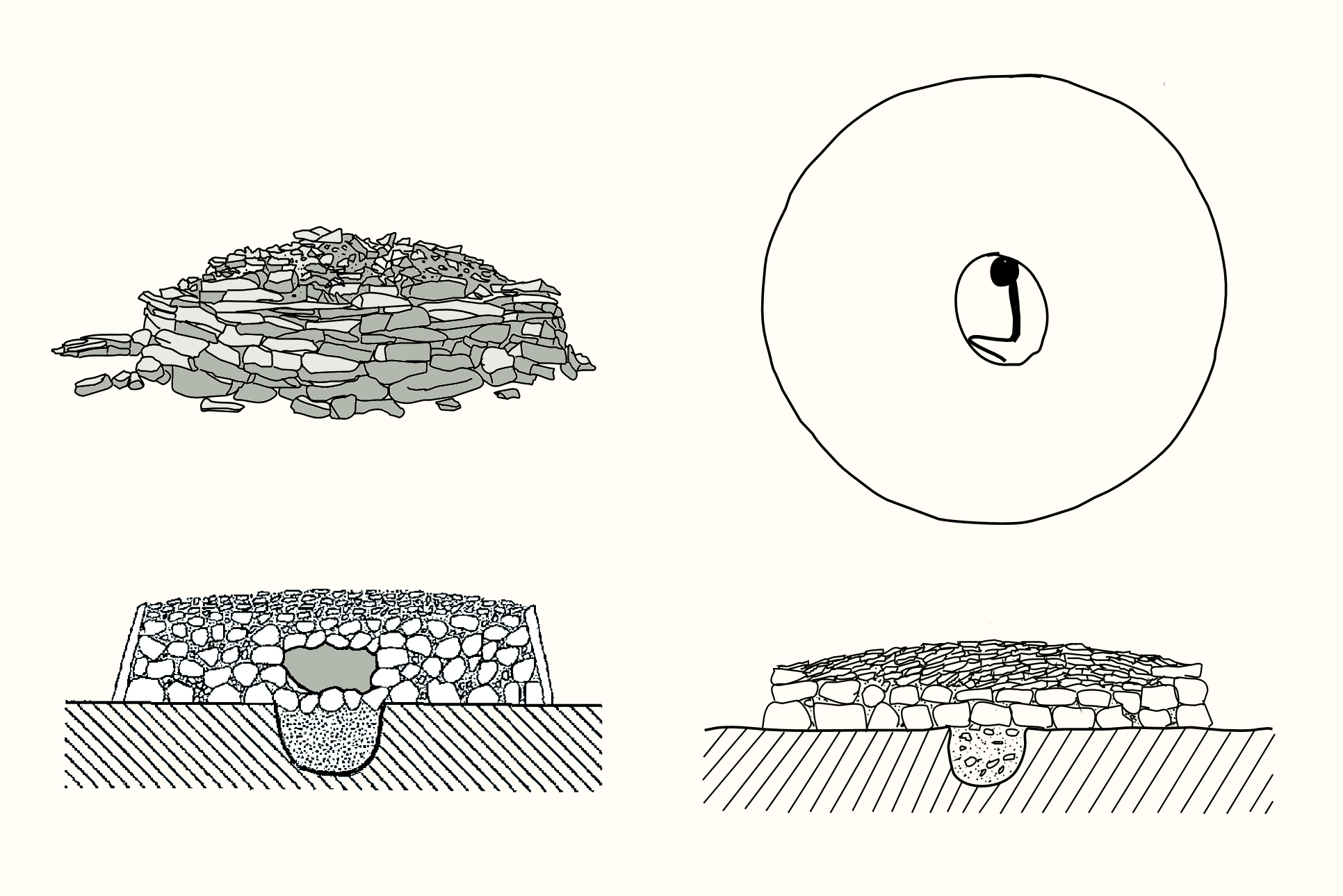
Bazina, double grave at the bottom left

The bazina closely resembles the plat-form tumulus. It differs from it in that it is about twice as high as an average platform tumulus. Its distinguishing feature is its outer covering, which is a carefully constructed dry stone wall. This wall may be built in steps and have an opening. A circular floor plan is predominant, though some are square. They range in diameter from 2.5 to 15 meters and can reach heights of up to 5 meters. Typical features include "cultic annexes," or "altars", sacred stones, and treasure chests. Standing stones pointing eastward are also found. Some bazinas are surrounded by one or more concentric circles of stones. Others have vaulted roofs or funnel-shaped depressions in the roof area. In Western and Central Sahara, there is a connection between bazinas and Libyco-Berber inscriptions on stelae erected over graves. This also applies to tumuli and antenna tombs in those regions. Dated examples of this script from the Sahara date from the 1st to the 4th century AD. Bazinas are quite common in the Hoggar and Tassili n'Ajjer regions, as well as in northern Niger. They are found not only in the Sahara but also in the northern Sahel and the Maghreb.

=== Ring tumulus ===
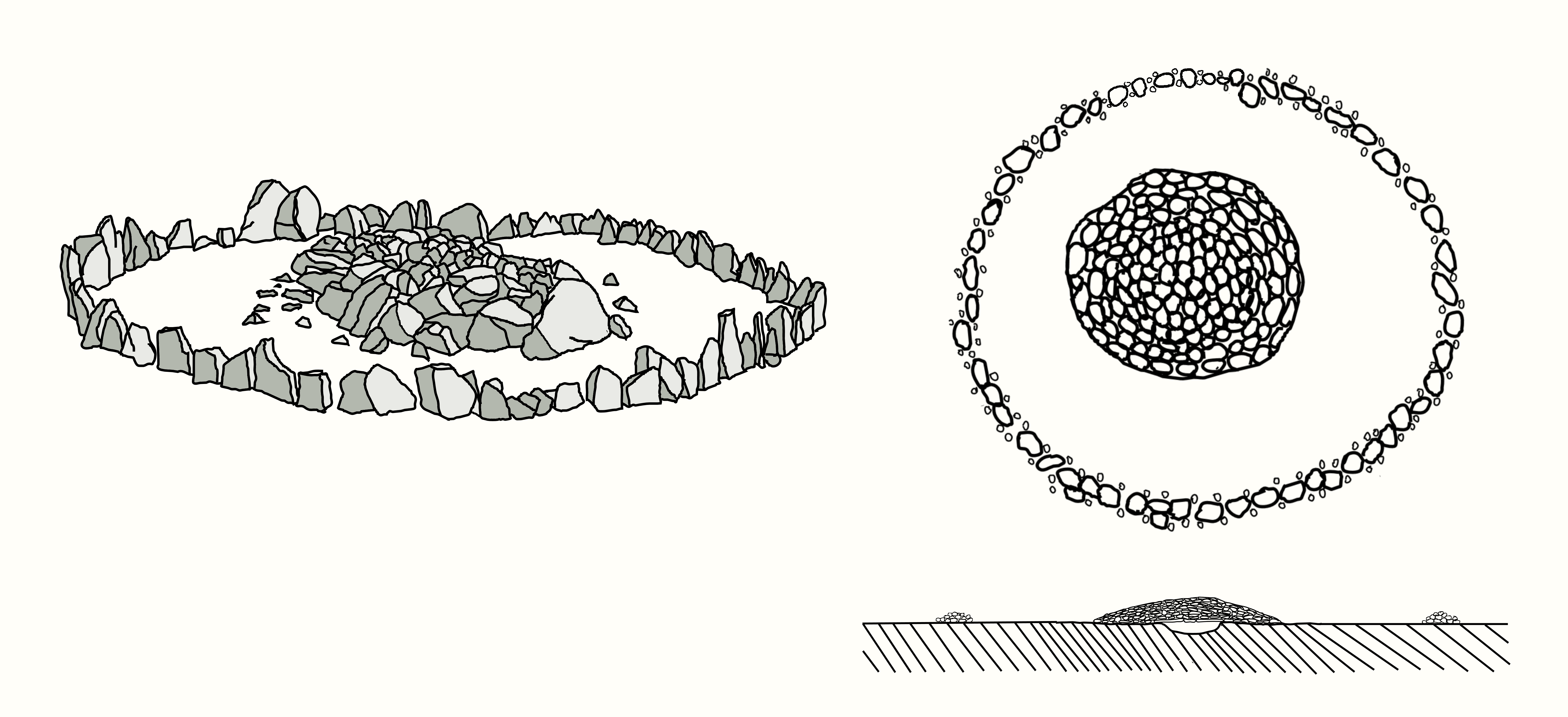
Ring tumulus

(also known as a “sombrero” monument) At a certain distance from the tumulus, a concentric stone circle is arranged as an enclosure. This may also consist of standing slabs. Sometimes there may be multiple circles. This type of burial is widespread in areas with tumuli. Their diameter varies from 2.5 m to perhaps 50 m. In the Dhar Tagant region, in southeastern Mauritania, 183 ring tumuli were identified and attributed to the late and final phases of the Tichitt tradition of the local prehistoric rock art.

=== Crater tumulus ===
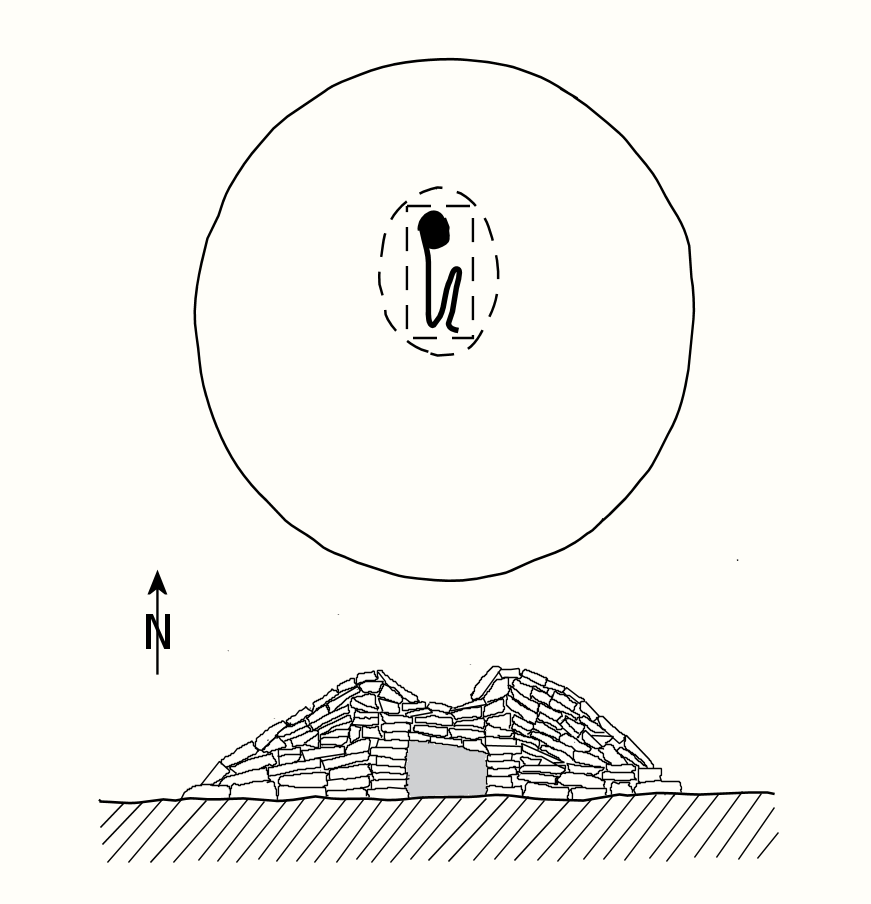
Crater tumulus

This burial type has a tumulus with a depression in the center that resembles a crater. This depression is often partially filled with sand. Its size corresponds to that of other tumuli, though there are also very large examples. There are numerous examples in all regions of the Central Sahara.

Thanks to excavation campaigns, the Iwelen graves in northern Niger (at the Sahel transition zone) have been well studied. Unlike the older platform tumuli in the area, there are more women's and children's graves. More grave goods and jewelry have also been found. These grave goods primarily consist of whole and broken pottery found near human remains, in the superstructure, or at the edge of the grave. It is believed that these everyday objects were intentionally left behind at the end of the burial rites, rather than being offerings. Based on analyses of bone finds, engravings on stelae, and pottery associated with these graves, they have been dated to the beginning of the Caballin period of rock art.

=== Drum-shaped tomb ===
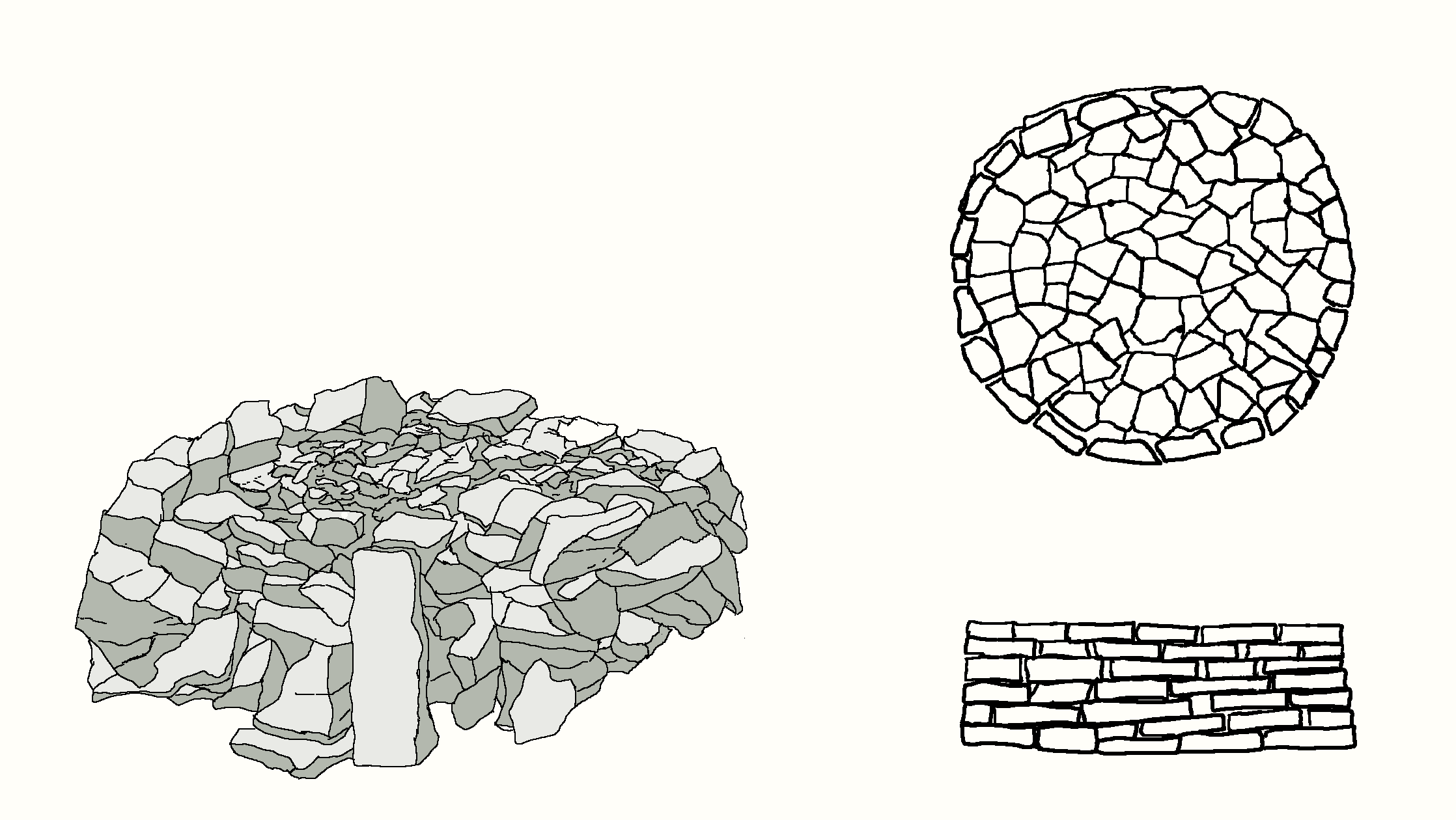
Drum-shaped tomb, on the left with a stele

It is originally shaped like a drum. Its size corresponds to that of a bazina. The top surface is usually sunken, either due to grave robbing or a collapsed burial chamber. As a result, they often resemble bird's nests today. They are primarily found in the Fezzan region of southwestern Libya but also in northern Niger. In a typical grave from the Garamantes period, the deceased is placed in a shaft in a squatting position on a straw mat. Household items, such as amphorae and tableware for food and drink, were often included as grave goods. Jewelry is rare, and when present, it consists mainly of beads. Stelae are sometimes erected in front of the graves, some of which bear Libyco-Berber inscriptions or are shaped like hands.

Outside of Fewet, 10 km west of Ghat in southwestern Libya, a necropolis containing over 1,300 burial mounds of various types from the Garamantian period was explored. Pottery of Roman and Garamantian origin was found in the drum-shaped tombs. The female skeletons were oriented west-east, while the male ones were oriented east-west. Most were single graves. Among the multiple graves was a drum-shaped tomb with an adjoining, smaller tomb of the same shape containing the remains of a woman and a child.

=== Antenna tomb ===
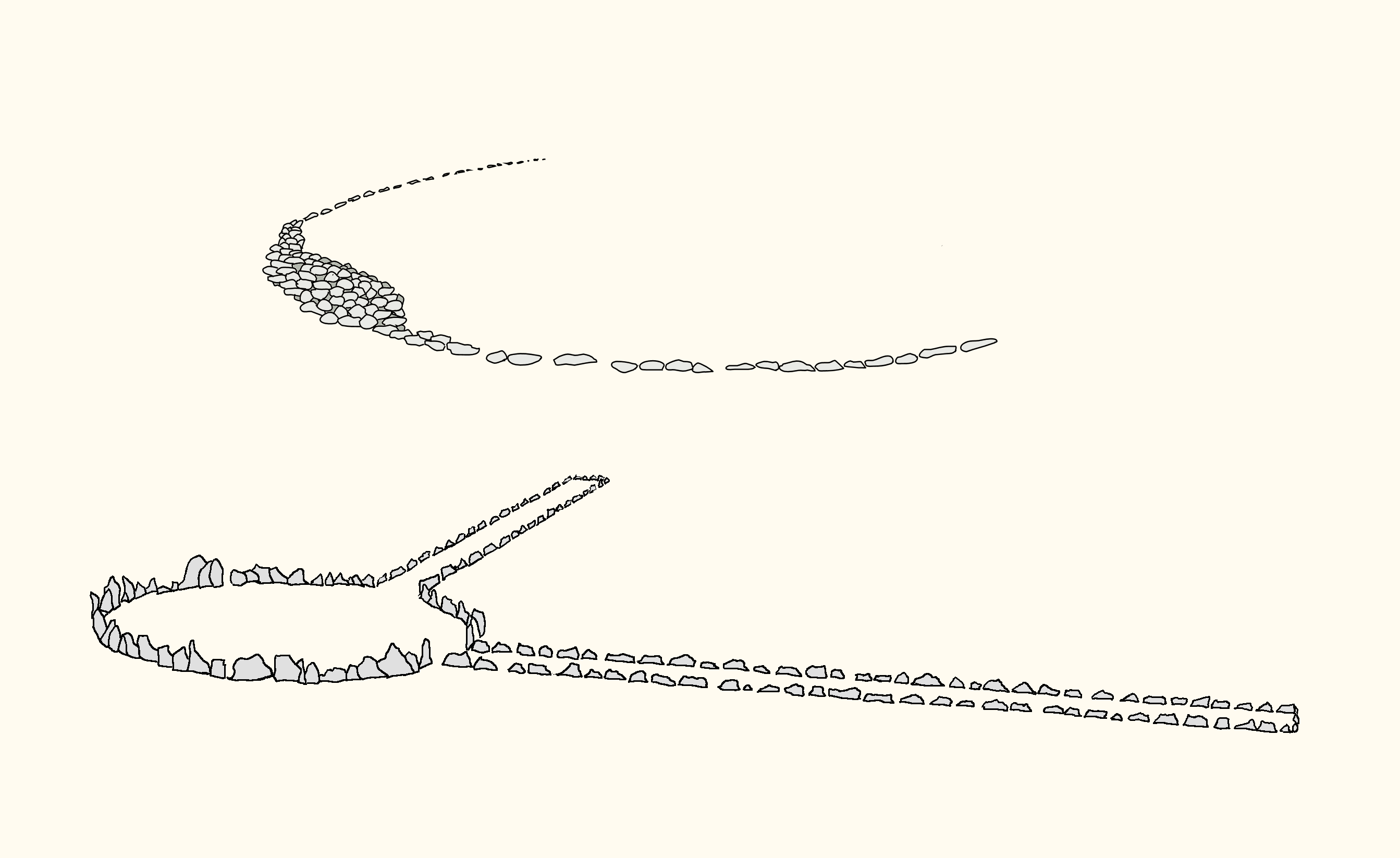
Antenna tomb and V-shaped antenna tomb

Two forms can be distinguished. The more common first type has the same shape as the crescent tomb and includes a tumulus. An extension leads away from both ends of the crescent in a straight line or an arc. These extensions resemble antennas. The second type is the V-shaped antenna tomb. It occurs primarily on flat terrain, has no tumulus, and has a flat, circular shape covered with stones or stone slabs, like a basket monument. From there, two narrow, often perfectly straight arms extend outward. Sometimes these consist of two rows of upright stone slabs each. The shortest "antennas" measure about 10 meters, while the longest reach up to 600 meters. The Tuareg therefore called them "chairs of giants." Most are oriented toward the east, though in the Western Sahara, they also face west. These structures are prevalent in the Tassili n'Ajjer and Hoggar regions, as well as in southeastern Libya, northern Niger, northeastern Mali, and Mauritania.

=== Tumulus with alignements ===
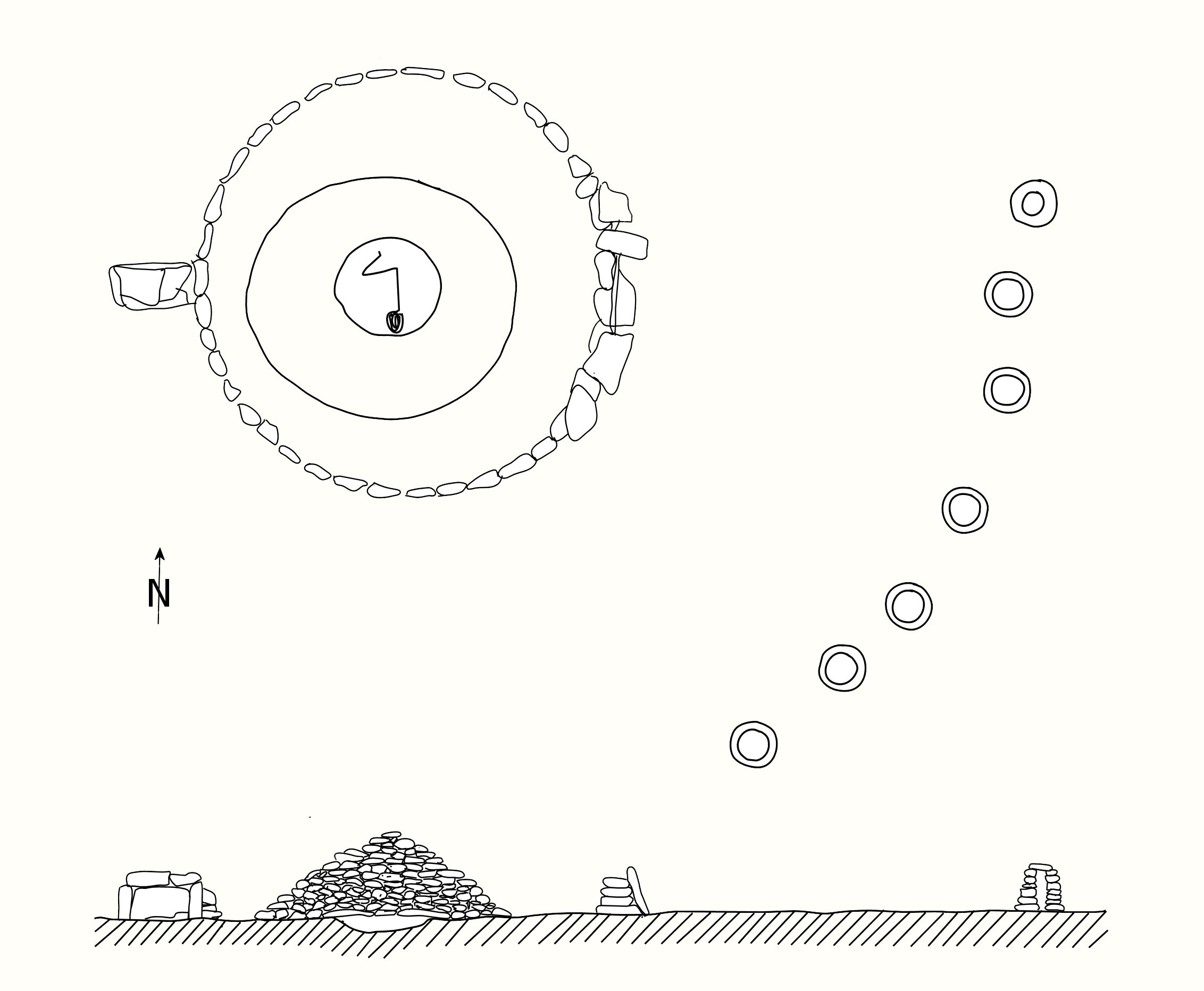
Tumulus with aligments

(also known as "cairn in alignments" or "complex monument") Along with the keyhole monument, it is the most complex example of funerary architecture. At the centre is a tumulus or bazina. These are sometimes surrounded by a stone ring. Outside these are secondary structures in the form of small stone towers arranged regularly in lines, arcs or circles around the tumulus or bazina, or in straight lines pointing towards the moonrise. The diameter of the tumulus or bazina ranges from 2.5 to 36 metres; the number of turrets varies from two to 60; and the length of the row of turrets ranges from 2.5 to 90 metres. In the Ighazer region, west of the Aïr Mountains in northern Niger, one of the turrets often served as a stone sacrificial box. Grave goods found include copper or iron jewellery, pottery and spear fragments. This region has the highest concentration of this type of burial monument. They are also common in the Adrar des Ifoghas in Mali but are also found in the Immidir and Hoggar Mountains, as well as further west in Mauritania and southern Morocco (Djebel Ouarkziz).

=== Compass tomb ===
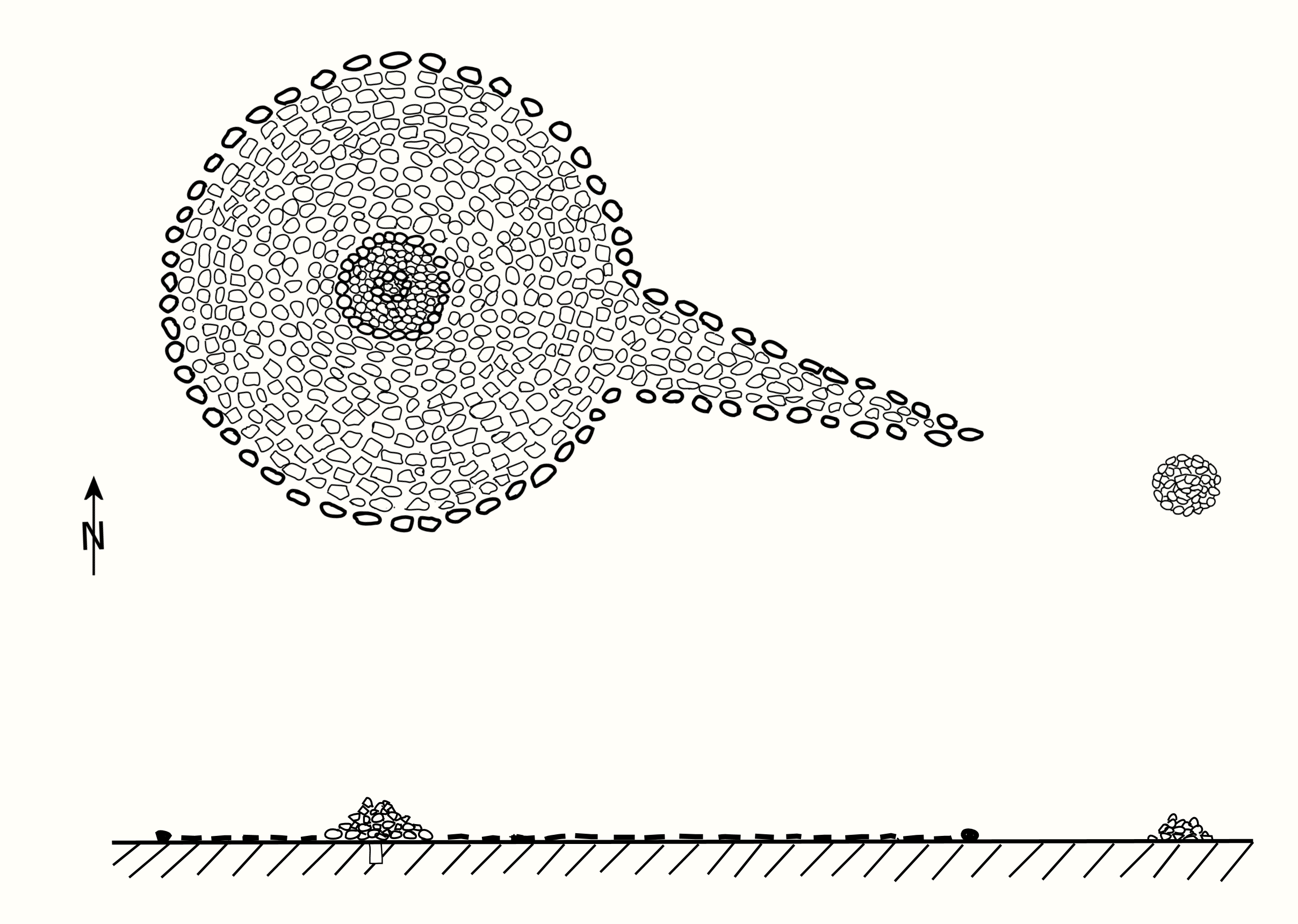
Compass tomb

It is a circular burial monument with a pointed bulge or pointer-shaped extension. Like a compass, it points in a specific direction: east-southeast. Compass tombs are found in the Tibesti Mountains region of Chad. The surveyed tombs range in length from 15 to 50 meters.

=== Well-like monument ===
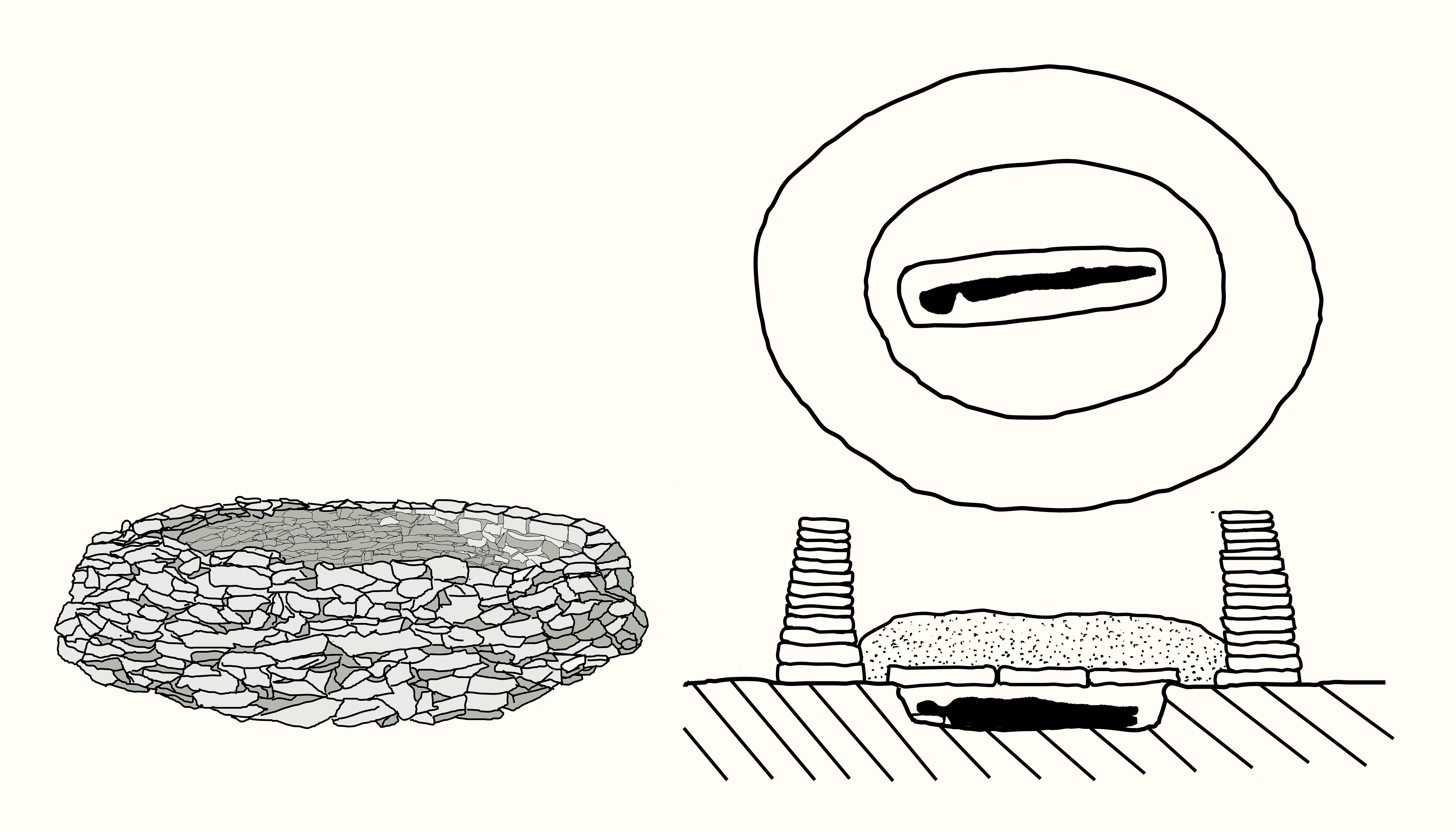
Well-like monument

(also called "tower-shaped cylindrical monument") This type of grave marks the transition from animism to Islam. It is named as such because its shape resembles the surrounding wall of a well. The "well rim" is made of loose stone slabs. Sometimes, it is also bordered by upright stone slabs. The grave's shape is often round (often found on children's graves), oval, or rectangular. It has a diameter ranging from about 2 to 5 meters and a height ranging from about one to 2.5 meters. The grave is open at the top but may have a cover slab at the bottom. Beneath this slab is a pit containing human remains. In other locations, especially where the ground is rocky, the well-like monument itself serves as a burial chamber, and the body is covered with slabs. Well-like monuments were investigated in northern Niger. The deceased were buried in an indigo-dyed cotton tunic, wrapped in a white cotton cloth, and bound with palm fibers. The corpses were laid out in a right-side-lying position, with their heads pointing south and their eyes facing east. This corresponds to the prescribed Islamic burial position with the face turned toward Mecca. Later, by the end of the first millennium AD, these burial monuments were replaced by simpler graves that were more in accordance with the new religion. Well-like monuments are primarily found in the Central Sahara. They occur individually but also in extensive necropolises. In the Hoggar region, such tombs are located near settlements like Abalessa, Silet, and Tit.

== Other burial monuments ==
=== Tomb of Tin Hinan ===
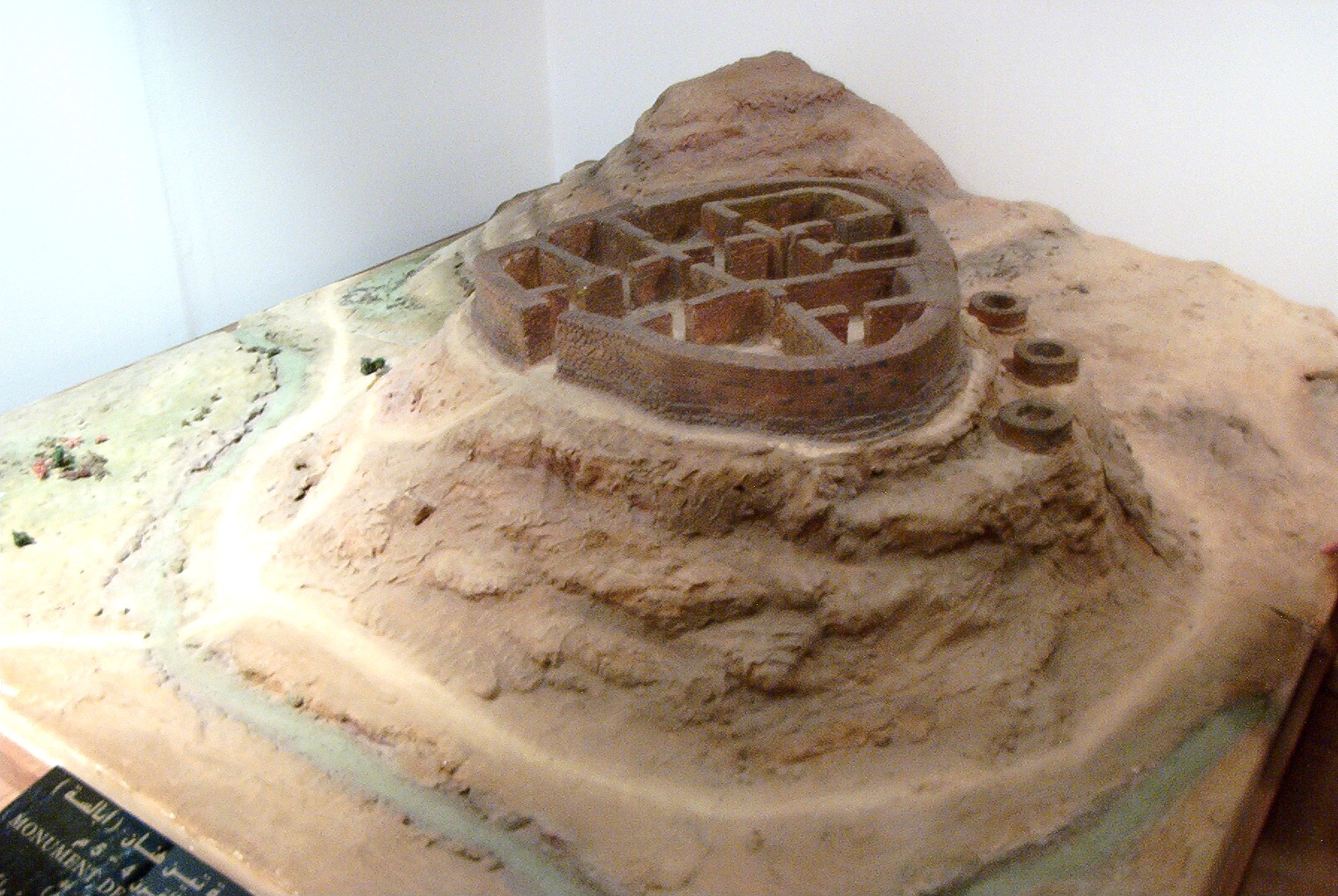
Model of the tomb of Tin Hinan

This monument originally comprised nine small chambers and stands southeast of Abalessa, an Algerian town on the edge of the Hoggar Mountains. Inside, the remains of a woman were found alongside precious jewelry and grave goods, allowing the site to be dated to the 4th century AD. According to a Tuareg legend from the Kel Rela ethnic group, this woman was their matriarch named Tin Hinan.

== Gallery ==
(The legend appears when you hover your mouse over the image.)

Crater tumulus, Algerian Sahara

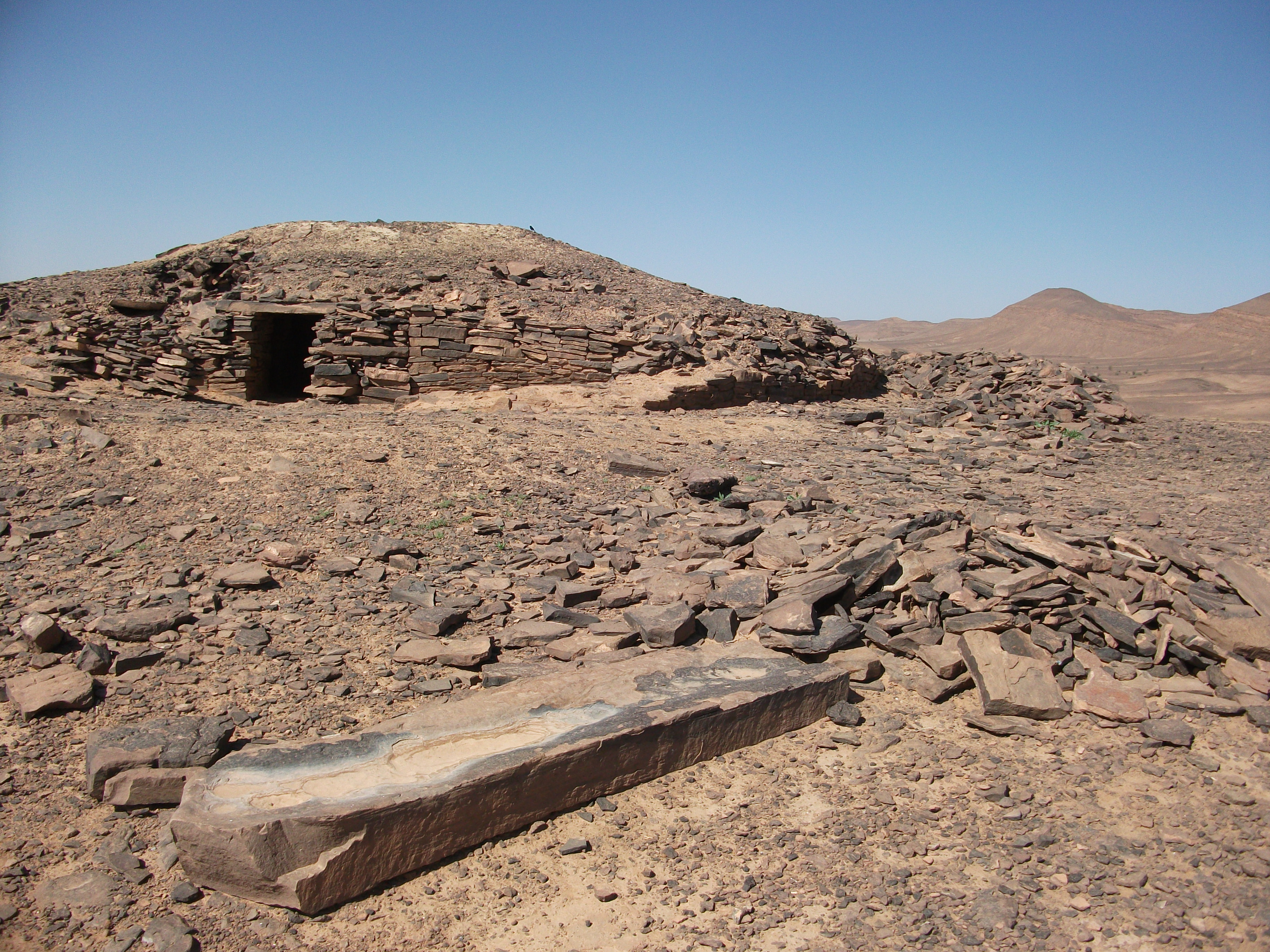
Bazina near Taouz, Moroccan Sahara

Antenna tomb with tumulus, Mauritania

V-shaped antenna tomb, Afara Plain, Algerian Sahara
Basket monument, Western Sahara

Keyhole monument on the Afara Plain, with the Tassili n'Ajjer in the background

Goulet, western variant, Immidir Mountains, Algerian Sahara

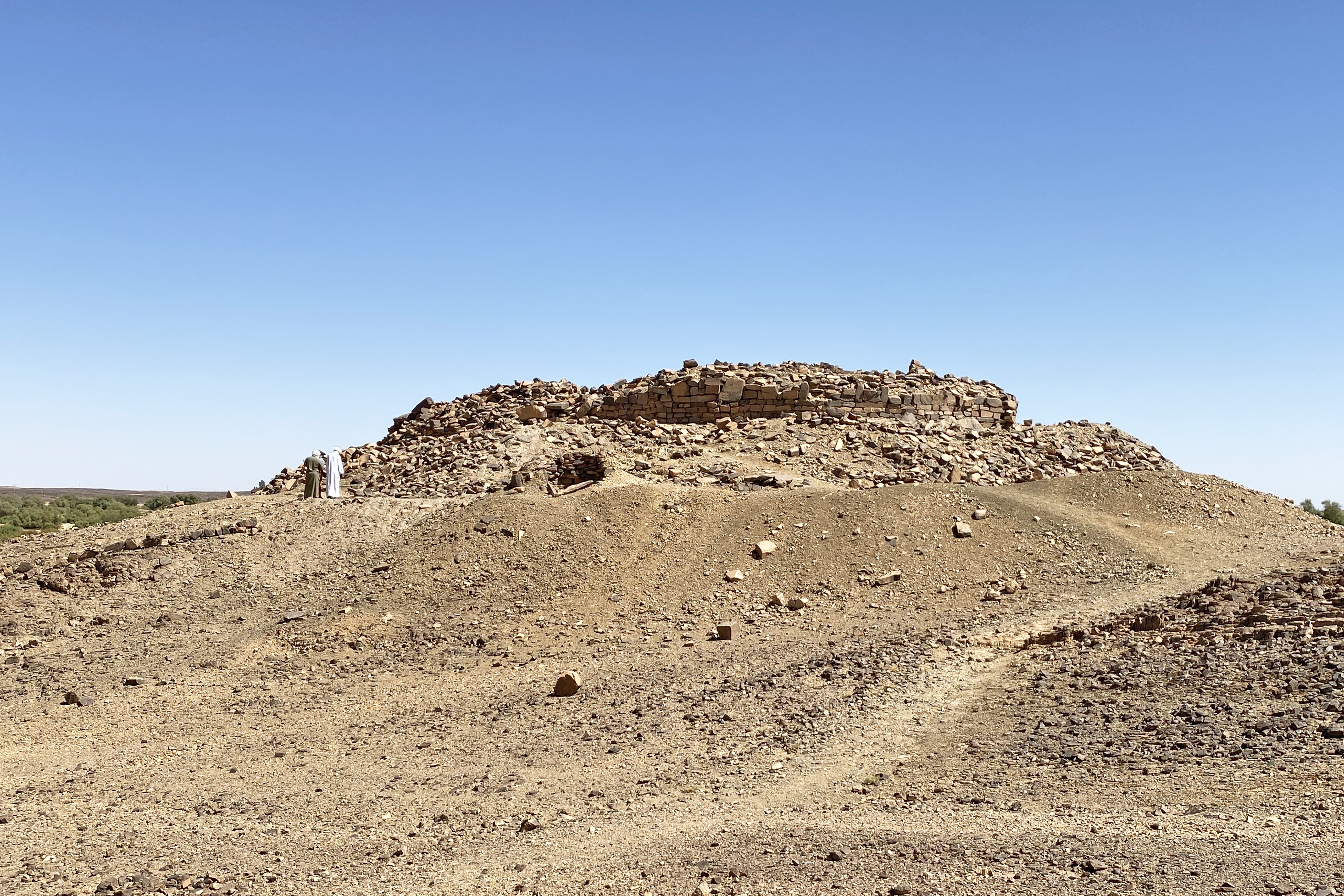
Tomb of Tin Hinan, Abalessa, Algeria

== Burial monuments and rock art ==
To learn more about the culture and living conditions of the builders of specific types of burial monuments, we need sufficient knowledge of the age and distribution of the monuments and rock art, as well as a content analysis of the images. Here are four examples: The first three focus on the Fezzan region in southwestern Libya and the fourth on the broader Tassili n’Ajjer region in southeastern Algeria. The analysis incorporates additional findings from archaeological research and climate history.

=== Life in the Fezzan during the era of basket monuments ===
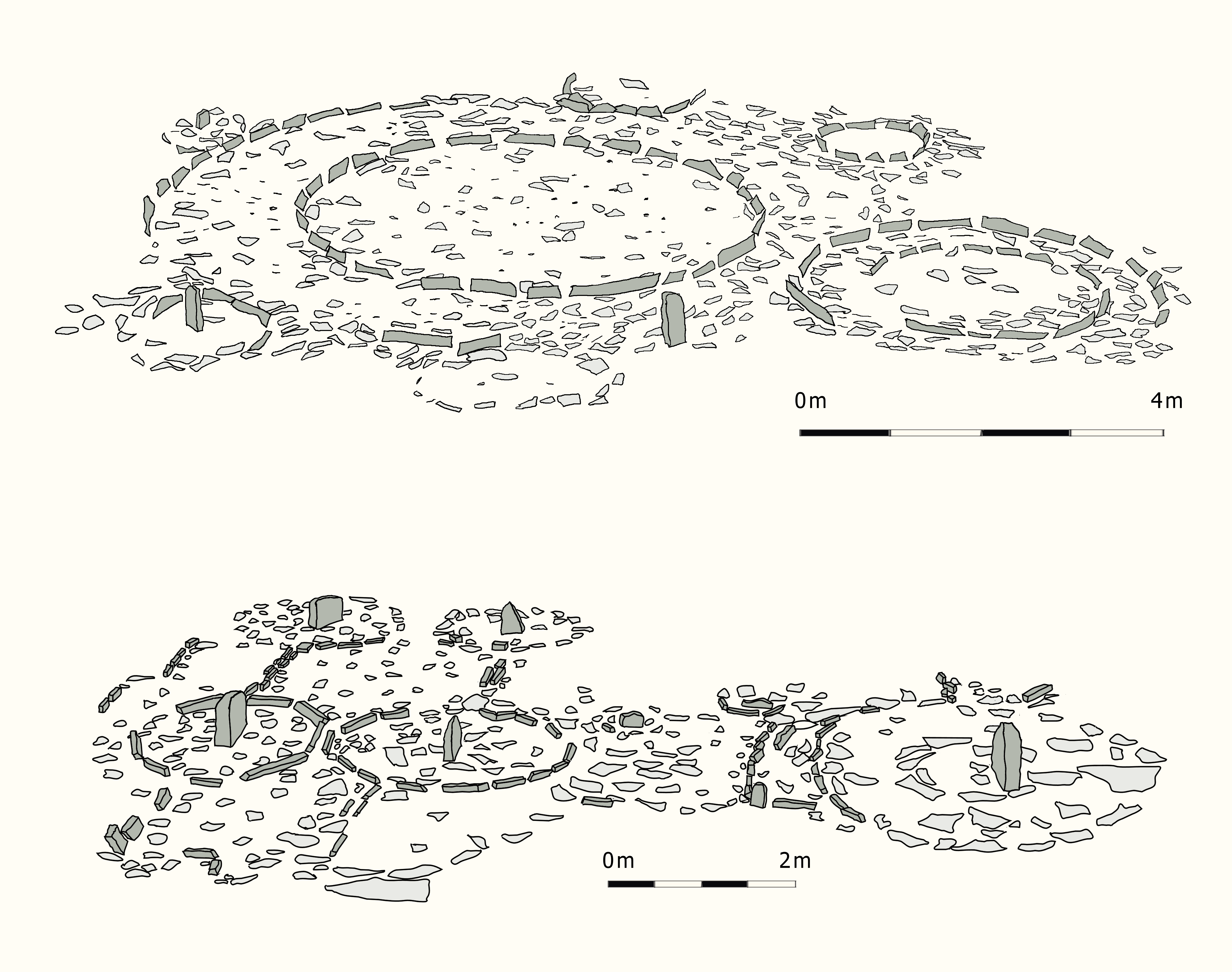
Two basket monuments with stone circles and stelae from the Messak Settafet

In the Fezzan, the numerous basket monuments are associated with the Messak style of rock engravings. During the Early Bovidian period (5500–4000 BC), the dead were buried in individual graves in pits, with no above-ground structures. At the same time, the first burial monuments emerged on the Messak Settafet plateau. These are basket monuments containing the remains of domesticated cattle, as well as some sheep and goats. These monuments are interpreted as expressions of rituals incorporating their livestock. Between 4500 and 4000 BC, expanded forms of basket monuments emerged, surrounded by smaller stone circles. The engravings found on many stelae on and next to the graves are in the Messak style. They primarily depict animal figures. It is believed that these people had dark skin. The men are often depicted wearing shorts with wide belts. Women often wear long, fitted dresses with belts, sometimes reaching down to their ankles. They also wear jewelry. The most common pieces are bracelets on the wrists and elbows, as well as necklaces.

As the basket monuments emerged, the climate began to change, marking the start of the Neolithic humid phase. The Fezzan was a grassland with sparse tree cover similar to the Sahel region today. During the dry season, the people lived as nomads in the mountains and stayed in the lowlands during the wet months. Their primary means of subsistence was animal husbandry (cattle, sheep, and goats), as well as gathering seeds from wild grains. Hunting was also depicted in the rock engravings.

In the earliest phase of Messak rock art, the engravings depict cattle wearing necklaces and headdresses. The cattle are led on a leash or ridden. Their skin and saddle blankets are richly decorated with motifs. Together with the elaborately designed animal graves, this demonstrates the great value these people placed on their cattle.

=== Life in the Fezzan during the era of tumuli ===
During the Late Bovidian period (4000–2200 BC), the climate remained humid initially, but around 3000 BC, the Neolithic humid phase ended. In the preceding centuries, Mediterranean populations—the ancestors of the Berber people—had migrated from the northeast and soon became the dominant group. As aridity increased, people became more mobile. Areas with groundwater sources close to the surface offered the best living conditions. This was the case in the Wadi Tanezzuft, north of present-day Ghat, and in the Wadi al-Adjal at the northeastern foot of the Messak Settafet. In the Wadi Tanezzuft, an approximately 100-km-long oasis developed containing hundreds of settlements. This led to environmental overexploitation and the depletion of resources. Consequences include increased competition, a rise in sedentary lifestyles, and further social and cultural changes.

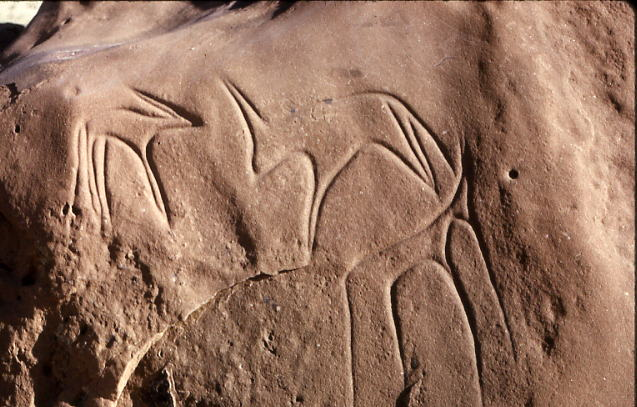
Antelopes in the Tazina style

During this period, people of all ages and genders—though they were only a minority of the population—were buried in funerary monuments rather than animal remains. Conical tumuli became the most common type of burial mound. Some of these tumuli are particularly large and stand alone. Often, they are situated in strategic locations to control important resources. Burial goods include ritual and personal objects. Along with other evidence, these findings indicate that the social structure became more hierarchical. The Tazina style appears in rock art during this period. Engravings of domesticated cattle with long, tapered legs dominate. These elegant figures demonstrate that the artists' capacity for abstraction was well developed.

=== Life in the Fezzan during the era of drum-shaped tombs ===
Beginning in the ninth century BC, the Kingdom of the Garamantes gradually developed in the Fezzan and remained in existence until around 700 AD. At its peak, it encompassed the entire Fezzan and perhaps parts of southeastern Algeria. A large portion of the population was sedentary and engaged in agriculture. The climate had become somewhat more humid again. The foggara system was used to tap into groundwater to supply wells and irrigate fields. Emmer, bread wheat, and barley were cultivated as grains, while dates, grapes, and figs were harvested as fruits.

Since the Late Bovidian period, the number of funerary monuments increased considerably. The monumental aspect lay not in the individual burial structures, but in the size of the burial grounds, which extended to vast burial landscapes. The Garamantes primarily constructed drum-shaped tombs, estimated to number around 120,000. Additionally, there are bazinas, antenna tombs, and square step pyramids.[

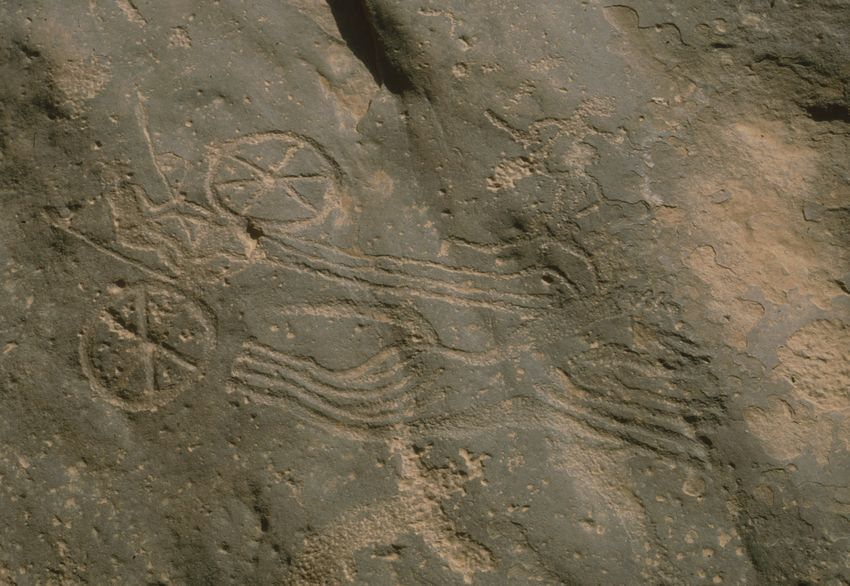
“At a Flying Gallop”: Caballin style

As for rock engravings and paintings, the late Caballin style dates to the 1st millennium BC. Cattle were the most common type of livestock. They were used for draft work and as mounts. However, sheep and goats also appear. Dogs are depicted in hunting scenes. The primary prey are mouflons and antelopes. Around 1500 BC, horses first appeared, depicted in a "flying gallop," harnessed to single-axle chariots. In one depiction, a woman leads it; otherwise, leading is reserved for men. It is believed that the chariot was primarily a status symbol of the elite. Later depictions show people riding horses. The women wear long, flowing skirts, and the men wear knee-length tunics. The men are often armed with sticks, whips, spears with metal tips, and round shields. The images show that these weapons were used. Compared to the period of the Late Bovidian culture, these were rather warlike times. After the turn of the era, the Camelin style of rock engravings spread as the climate became progressively drier. Nomadism increased, cattle herding gradually disappeared, and the domesticated dromedary made it possible to continue living outside of oases.

=== Life in the Tassili n'Ajjer during the era of the keyhole monuments ===
The keyhole monument area lies between the Tassili n’Ajjer Massif to the east, the Immidir Mountains to the west, and the Hoggar Massif to the south. This area corresponds quite closely to the region of Iheren-Tahilahi rock art. Based on this and radiocarbon dating, it is concluded that the monuments date from the same period—the world of herders and hunters of the 3rd millennium BC, during the Late Bovidian Culture era. This occurred after the Neolithic humid phase ended and the climate in the Central Sahara became increasingly arid.

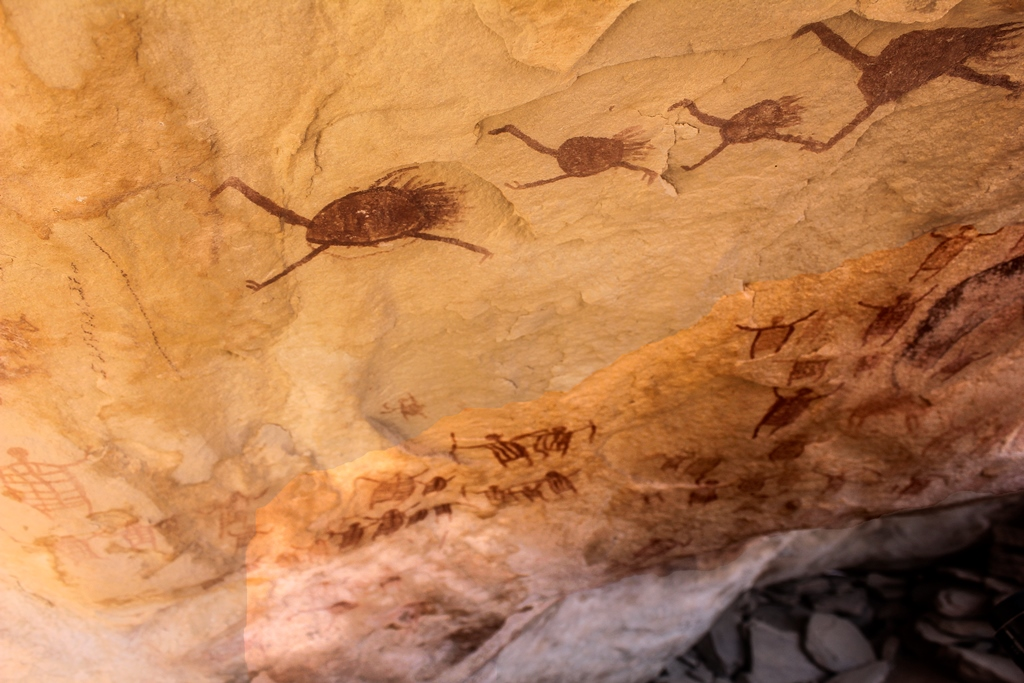
Fleeing ostriches: Iheren-Tahilahi rock art style

Neolithic people created the images and burial monuments. The depictions are rendered in a precise, naturalistic style with great detail. They depict many everyday activities, such as constructing nomadic camps, herding livestock, butchering animals, hunting, caring for children, dancing, and other social activities. With few exceptions, the people are depicted with light skin and straight hair. The men’s faces and bodies are often painted or tattooed, and they wear pointed beards and loincloths made of goatskin. Women often wear long skirts made of decorated fabrics and sometimes wear long, loose harem pants underneath. Both men and women wear jewelry. Most depictions of animals show sheep and cattle with widely curved horns. Elephants, antelopes, giraffes, and ostriches represent the fauna, but due to increasing aridity, large game soon retreats to the Sahel. There are many hunting scenes, including those involving lions. Fight scenes, however, are rare. For the most part, the images convey a peaceful way of life for this people.

== See also ==
- Tumulus

== Bibliography ==
- David J. Mattingly, Martin Sterry, Nick Ray, "Burials, Migration and Identity in the Ancient Sahara and Beyond". Cambridge University Press, 2019.
- Joanne Clarke, Nick Brooks, "The Archaeology of Western Sahara". Oxford: Oxbow Books, 2018.
- D. J. Mattingly, C. M. Daniels, J. N. Dore, D. Edwards, J. Hawthorne, The Archaeology of Fazzan: Synthesis". London: British Institute for Libyan and Northern African Studies, 2003.
- François Paris, "Coutumes funéraires néolithiques et post-néolithiques: essai d'interprétation à partir des sépultures fouillées au Nord-Niger". Paris: ORSTOM, 1995. (In French)
- Erwin M. Ruprechtsberger, "Die Garamanten – ein Wüstenvolk der Sahara". Graz: Institut für Antike, 2023. (In German)

== Notes and references ==
Most in this edit is translated from the existing German Wikipedia article at de:Vorislamische Grabmonumente in der Sahara; see its history for attribution.
