= Complexity =

Feature of systems that defy description

Complexity characterizes the behavior of a system or model whose components interact in multiple ways and follow local rules, leading to non-linearity, randomness, collective dynamics, hierarchy, and emergence.

The term is generally used to characterize something with many parts where those parts interact with each other in multiple ways, culminating in a higher order of emergence greater than the sum of its parts. The study of these complex linkages at various scales is the main goal of complex systems theory.

The intuitive criterion of complexity can be formulated as follows: a system would be more complex if more parts could be distinguished, and if more connections between them existed.

As of 2010, a number of approaches to characterizing complexity have been used in science; Zayed et al. reflect many of these. Neil Johnson states that "even among scientists, there is no unique definition of complexity – and the scientific notion has traditionally been conveyed using particular examples..." Ultimately Johnson adopts the definition of "complexity science" as "the study of the phenomena which emerge from a collection of interacting objects".

== Overview ==
Definitions of complexity often depend on the concept of a "system" – a set of parts or elements that have relationships among them differentiated from relationships with other elements outside the relational regime. Many definitions tend to postulate or assume that complexity expresses a condition of numerous elements in a system and numerous forms of relationships among the elements. However, what one sees as complex and what one sees as simple is relative and changes with time.

Warren Weaver posited in 1948 two forms of complexity: disorganized complexity, and organized complexity. Phenomena of 'disorganized complexity' are treated using probability theory and statistical mechanics, while 'organized complexity' deals with phenomena that escape such approaches and confront "dealing simultaneously with a sizable number of factors which are interrelated into an organic whole". Weaver's 1948 paper has influenced subsequent thinking about complexity.

The approaches that embody concepts of systems, multiple elements, multiple relational regimes, and state spaces might be summarized as implying that complexity arises from the number of distinguishable relational regimes (and their associated state spaces) in a defined system.

Some definitions relate to the algorithmic basis for the expression of a complex phenomenon or model or mathematical expression, as later set out herein.

== Disorganized versus organized ==
One of the problems in addressing complexity issues has been formalizing the intuitive conceptual distinction between the large number of variances in relationships extant in random collections, and the sometimes large, but smaller, number of relationships between elements in systems where constraints (related to correlation of otherwise independent elements) simultaneously reduce the variations from element independence and create distinguishable regimes of more-uniform, or correlated, relationships, or interactions.

Weaver perceived and addressed this problem, in at least a preliminary way, in drawing a distinction between "disorganized complexity" and "organized complexity": complex interactions patterns can occur through the localized interactions of multiple entities or through interactions between elements that form a coherent whole and have some degree of central control and regulation. Both types of complexity can involve feedback loops but these mechanisms are of different nature.

=== Disorganized complexity ===
A prime example of disorganized complexity is a gas in a container, with the gas molecules as the parts. Some would suggest that a system of disorganized complexity may be compared with the (relative) simplicity of planetary orbits – the latter can be predicted by applying Newton's laws of motion. Of course, most real-world systems, including planetary orbits, eventually become theoretically unpredictable even using Newtonian dynamics; as discovered by modern chaos theory. Other disorganized complexity phenomenon includes for example flocks of birds flying, crowd movements, traffic flows, structuration of social networks, interactions in a market… In Weaver's view, disorganized complexity results from the particular system having a very large number of parts, say millions of parts, or many more. Though the interactions of the parts in a "disorganized complexity" situation can be seen as largely random, the properties of the system as a whole can be understood by using probability and statistical methods. The emergence of patterns from such phenomenon is called self-organization or spontaneous order. In disorganized social systems, agents are influenced by the state of other agents. They act on the local information they have on the other agents they are connected to. The behaviors of the agents are thus coevolving.

=== Organized complexity ===
Organized complexity, in Weaver's view, resides in nothing else than the non-random, or correlated, interaction between the parts. These correlated relationships create a differentiated structure that can, as a system, interact with other systems. The coordinated system manifests properties not carried or dictated by individual parts. The organized aspect of this form of complexity with regard to other systems, rather than the subject system, can be said to "emerge," without any "guiding hand". The number of parts does not have to be very large for a particular system to have emergent properties. A system of organized complexity may be understood in its properties (behavior among the properties) through modeling and simulation, particularly modeling and simulation with computers. An example of organized complexity is a city neighborhood as a living mechanism, with the neighborhood people among the system's parts.

Weaver's "organized complexity" can be compared to Simon's "hierarchic system", which include for example the organization of cells into tissues, organs and organisms forming a coherent whole. Organized complexity is hierarchic in the sense that it is « analyzable into successive sets of subsystems ». In those hierarchic systems, « we can distinguish between the interactions among subsystems, on the one hand, and the interactions within subsystems – i.e., among the parts of those subsystems – on the other ». For examples, in the body there are interactions between cells and interactions between organs. For Simon a "hierarchic system" can exist with or without authority relation between a “boss” system and subordinate sub-systems.

== Sources and factors ==
There are generally rules which can be invoked to explain the origin of complexity in a given system.

The source of disorganized complexity is the large number of parts in the system of interest, and the lack of correlation between elements in the system.

In the case of self-organizing living systems, usefully organized complexity comes from beneficially mutated organisms being selected to survive by their environment for their differential reproductive ability or at least success over inanimate matter or less organized complex organisms. See e.g. Robert Ulanowicz's treatment of ecosystems. Interestingly, a strong correlation is observed between this organismal complexity and the mean length of genes.

Complexity of an object or system is a relative property. For instance, for many functions (problems), such a computational complexity as time of computation is smaller when multitape Turing machines are used than when Turing machines with one tape are used. Random Access Machines allow one to even more decrease time complexity (Greenlaw and Hoover 1998: 226), while inductive Turing machines can decrease even the complexity class of a function, language or set (Burgin 2005). This shows that tools of activity can be an important factor of complexity.

== Varied meanings ==
In several scientific fields, "complexity" has a precise meaning:

- In computational complexity theory, the amounts of resources required for the execution of algorithms is studied. The most popular types of computational complexity are the time complexity of a problem equal to the number of steps that it takes to solve an instance of the problem as a function of the size of the input (usually measured in bits), using the most efficient algorithm, and the space complexity of a problem equal to the volume of the memory used by the algorithm (e.g., cells of the tape) that it takes to solve an instance of the problem as a function of the size of the input (usually measured in bits), using the most efficient algorithm. This allows classification of computational problems by complexity class (such as P, NP, etc.). An axiomatic approach to computational complexity was developed by Manuel Blum. It allows one to deduce many properties of concrete computational complexity measures, such as time complexity or space complexity, from properties of axiomatically defined measures.
- In algorithmic information theory, the Kolmogorov complexity (also called descriptive complexity, algorithmic complexity or algorithmic entropy) of a string is the length of the shortest binary program that outputs that string. Minimum message length is a practical application of this approach. Different kinds of Kolmogorov complexity are studied: the uniform complexity, prefix complexity, monotone complexity, time-bounded Kolmogorov complexity, and space-bounded Kolmogorov complexity. An axiomatic approach to Kolmogorov complexity based on Blum axioms (Blum 1967) was introduced by Mark Burgin in the paper presented for publication by Andrey Kolmogorov. The axiomatic approach encompasses other approaches to Kolmogorov complexity. It is possible to treat different kinds of Kolmogorov complexity as particular cases of axiomatically defined generalized Kolmogorov complexity. Instead of proving similar theorems, such as the basic invariance theorem, for each particular measure, it is possible to easily deduce all such results from one corresponding theorem proved in the axiomatic setting. This is a general advantage of the axiomatic approach in mathematics. The axiomatic approach to Kolmogorov complexity was further developed in the book (Burgin 2005) and applied to software metrics (Burgin and Debnath, 2003; Debnath and Burgin, 2003).
- In information theory, information fluctuation complexity is the fluctuation of information about information entropy. It is derivable from fluctuations in the predominance of order and chaos in a dynamic system and has been used as a measure of complexity in many diverse fields.
- In information processing, complexity is a measure of the total number of properties transmitted by an object and detected by an observer. Such a collection of properties is often referred to as a state.
- In physical systems, complexity is a measure of the probability of the state vector of the system. This should not be confused with entropy; it is a distinct mathematical measure, one in which two distinct states are never conflated and considered equal, as is done for the notion of entropy in statistical mechanics.
- In dynamical systems, statistical complexity measures the size of the minimum program able to statistically reproduce the patterns (configurations) contained in the data set (sequence). While the algorithmic complexity implies a deterministic description of an object (it measures the information content of an individual sequence), the statistical complexity, like forecasting complexity, implies a statistical description, and refers to an ensemble of sequences generated by a certain source. Formally, the statistical complexity reconstructs a minimal model comprising the collection of all histories sharing a similar probabilistic future and measures the entropy of the probability distribution of the states within this model. It is a computable and observer-independent measure based only on the internal dynamics of the system and has been used in studies of emergence and self-organization.
- In mathematics, Krohn–Rhodes complexity is an important topic in the study of finite semigroups and automata.
- In network theory, complexity is the product of richness in the connections between components of a system, and defined by a very unequal distribution of certain measures (some elements being highly connected and some very few, see complex network).
- In software engineering, programming complexity is a measure of the interactions of the various elements of the software. This differs from the computational complexity described above in that it is a measure of the design of the software. Halstead complexity measures, cyclomatic complexity, time complexity, and parameterized complexity are closely linked concepts.
- In model theory, U-rank is a measure of the complexity of a complete type in the context of stable theories.
- In bioinformatics, linguistic sequence complexity is a measure of the vocabulary richness of a genetic text in gene sequences
- In statistical learning theory, the Vapnik–Chervonenkis dimension is a measure of the size (capacity, complexity, expressive power, richness, or flexibility) of a class of sets.
- In computational learning theory, Rademacher complexity is a measure of richness of a class of sets with respect to a probability distribution.
- In sociology, social complexity is a conceptual framework used in the analysis of society.
- In combinatorial game theory, measures of game complexity involve understanding game positions, possible outcomes, and computation required for various game scenarios.
- In binary number, Abstract Complexity Definition (ACD) formalizes complexity as the complexity of a binary structure, expressed by the formula: C = N² / n, where N is the number of detectable regularities (contrasts), and n is the number of basic elements (0 and 1). These regularities are identified with contrasts—tensions arising from interactions of common and differentiating features—and with structural information (as opposed to Shannon’s telecommunication information). The formula incorporates two factors:• the N/n ratio, representing information compression/density, and the number of regularities N, introduced to account for the difficulty of compressing longer structures. This definition applies both analogically and directly wherever a system can be expressed in binary form, e.g., in music. Differences from classical structural complexity definitions: Traditional definitions focus on the number of elements and relations without specifying the nature of these relations. In ACD, relations are explicitly defined as tensions (contrasts) resulting from interactions of common and differentiating features of system elements, with a defined dynamics. This makes the definition constructive and operational—allowing formal calculation of complexity.Intuitive criterion of complexity:Complexity is the number of distinguishable elements and the number of connections between them. In relation to contrast: differentiating features correspond to distinguishable elements, common features correspond to connections between those elements. The more such features exist and the stronger their interactions, the greater the contrast, and thus the higher the complexity.

Other fields introduce less precisely defined notions of complexity:

- A complex adaptive system has some or all of the following attributes:
  - The number of parts (and types of parts) in the system and the number of relations between the parts is non-trivial – however, there is no general rule to separate "trivial" from "non-trivial";
  - The system has memory or includes feedback;
  - The system can adapt itself according to its history or feedback;
  - The relations between the system and its environment are non-trivial or non-linear;
  - The system can be influenced by, or can adapt itself to, its environment;
  - The system is highly sensitive to initial conditions.
- Peak complexity is the concept that human societies address problems by adding social and economic complexity, but that process is subject to diminishing marginal returns

== Study ==
Complexity has always been a part of our environment, and therefore many scientific fields have dealt with complex systems and phenomena. From one perspective, that which is somehow complex – displaying variation without being random – is most worthy of interest given the rewards found in the depths of exploration.

The use of the term complex is often confused with the term complicated. In today's systems, this is the difference between myriad connecting "stovepipes" and effective "integrated" solutions. This means that complex is the opposite of independent, while complicated is the opposite of simple.

While this has led some fields to come up with specific definitions of complexity, there is a more recent movement to regroup observations from different fields to study complexity in itself, whether it appears in anthills, human brains or social systems. One such interdisciplinary group of fields is relational order theories.

== Topics ==
=== Behaviour ===
The behavior of a complex system is often said to be due to emergence and self-organization. Chaos theory has investigated the sensitivity of systems to variations in initial conditions as one cause of complex behaviour.

=== Mechanisms ===
Recent developments in artificial life, evolutionary computation and genetic algorithms have led to an increasing emphasis on complexity and complex adaptive systems.

=== Simulations ===
In social science, the study on the emergence of macro-properties from the micro-properties, also known as macro-micro view in sociology. The topic is commonly recognized as social complexity that is often related to the use of computer simulation in social science, i.e. computational sociology.

=== Systems ===
Systems theory has long been concerned with the study of complex systems (in recent times, complexity theory and complex systems have also been used as names of the field). These systems are present in the research of a variety of disciplines, including biology, economics, social studies and technology. Recently, complexity has become a natural domain of interest of real-world socio-cognitive systems and emerging systemics research. Complex systems tend to be high-dimensional, non-linear, and difficult to model. In specific circumstances, they may exhibit low-dimensional behaviour.

=== Data ===
In information theory, algorithmic information theory is concerned with the complexity of strings of data.

Complex strings are harder to compress. While intuition tells us that this may depend on the codec used to compress a string (a codec could be theoretically created in any arbitrary language, including one in which the very small command "X" could cause the computer to output a very complicated string like "18995316"), any two Turing-complete languages can be implemented in each other, meaning that the length of two encodings in different languages will vary by at most the length of the "translation" language – which will end up being negligible for sufficiently large data strings.

These algorithmic measures of complexity tend to assign high values to random noise. However, under a certain understanding of complexity, arguably the most intuitive one, random noise is meaningless and so not complex at all.

Information entropy is also sometimes used in information theory as indicative of complexity, but entropy is also high for randomness. In the case of complex systems, information fluctuation complexity was designed so as not to measure randomness as complex and has been useful in many applications. More recently, a complexity metric was developed for images that can avoid measuring noise as complex by using the minimum description length principle.

=== Classification Problems ===
There has also been interest in measuring the complexity of classification problems in supervised machine learning. This can be useful in meta-learning to determine for which data sets filtering (or removing suspected noisy instances from the training set) is the most beneficial and could be expanded to other areas. For binary classification, such measures can consider the overlaps in feature values from differing classes, the separability of the classes, and measures of geometry, topology, and density of manifolds.

For non-binary classification problems, instance hardness is a bottom-up approach that first seeks to identify instances that are likely to be misclassified (assumed to be the most complex). The characteristics of such instances are then measured using supervised measures such as the number of disagreeing neighbors or the likelihood of the assigned class label given the input features.

=== In molecular recognition ===
A recent study based on molecular simulations and compliance constants describes molecular recognition as a phenomenon of organisation. Even for small molecules like carbohydrates, the recognition process can not be predicted or designed even assuming that each individual hydrogen bond's strength is exactly known.

=== The law of requisite complexity ===
Deriving from the law of requisite variety, Boisot and McKelvey formulated the ‘Law of Requisite Complexity’, that holds that, in order to be efficaciously adaptive, the internal complexity of a system must match the external complexity it confronts.

=== Positive, appropriate and negative complexity ===
The application in project management of the Law of Requisite Complexity, as proposed by Stefan Morcov, is the analysis of positive, appropriate and negative complexity.

=== In project management ===
Project complexity is the property of a project which makes it difficult to understand, foresee, and keep under control its overall behavior, even when given reasonably complete information about the project system.

=== In systems engineering ===
Maik Maurer considers complexity as a reality in engineering. He proposed a methodology for managing complexity in systems engineering :

1. Define the system.

2. Identify the type of complexity.

3. Determine the strategy.

4. Determine the method.

5. Model the system.

6. Implement the method.

== Applications ==
Computational complexity theory is the study of the complexity of problems – that is, the difficulty of solving them. Problems can be classified by complexity class according to the time it takes for an algorithm – usually a computer program – to solve them as a function of the problem size. Some problems are difficult to solve, while others are easy. For example, some difficult problems need algorithms that take an exponential amount of time in terms of the size of the problem to solve. Take the travelling salesman problem, for example. It can be solved, as denoted in Big O notation, in time $O(n^2 2^n)$ (where n is the size of the network to visit – the number of cities the travelling salesman must visit exactly once). As the size of the network of cities grows, the time needed to find the route grows (more than) exponentially.

Even though a problem may be computationally solvable in principle, in actual practice it may not be that simple. These problems might require large amounts of time or an inordinate amount of space. Computational complexity may be approached from many different aspects. Computational complexity can be investigated on the basis of time, memory or other resources used to solve the problem. Time and space are two of the most important and popular considerations when problems of complexity are analyzed.

There exist a certain class of problems that although they are solvable in principle they require so much time or space that it is not practical to attempt to solve them. These problems are called intractable.

There is another form of complexity called hierarchical complexity. It is orthogonal to the forms of complexity discussed so far, which are called horizontal complexity.

== Emerging applications in other fields ==
The concept of complexity is being increasingly used in the study of cosmology, big history, and cultural evolution with increasing granularity, as well as increasing quantification.

=== Application in cosmology ===
Eric Chaisson has advanced a cosmological complexity metric which he terms Energy Rate Density. This approach has been expanded in various works, most recently applied to measuring evolving complexity of nation-states and their growing cities.

== See also ==
- Assembly theory
- Chaos theory
- Complexity theory (disambiguation page)
- Complex network
- Complex system
- Cyclomatic complexity
- Digital morphogenesis
- Dual-phase evolution
- Emergence
- Evolution of complexity
- Fractal
- Game complexity
- Holism in science
- Law of Complexity/Consciousness
- Model of hierarchical complexity
- Names of large numbers
- Network science
- Network theory
- Novelty theory
- Occam's razor
- Percolation theory
- Process architecture
- Programming Complexity
- Sociology and complexity science
- Systems theory
- Thorngate's postulate of commensurate complexity
- Variety (cybernetics)
- Volatility, uncertainty, complexity and ambiguity
- Arthur Winfree
- Computational irreducibility
- Zero-Force Evolutionary Law
- Project complexity
