= Texas Tech University Press =

University press for Texas Tech University

- Parent company: Texas Tech University
- Founded: 1971 (55 years ago)
- Country of origin: United States
- Headquarters location: Lubbock, Texas
- Distribution: self-distributed (US); Eurospan Group (EMEA); East-West Export Books (Asia, the Pacific, Australia)
- Key people: Brian L. Ott
- Publication types: Books
- Official website: ttupress.org

The Texas Tech University Press (TTUP), founded in 1971, is the university press of the American Texas Tech University, located in Lubbock, Texas. The press is a member of the Association of University Presses.

== See also ==
- List of English-language book publishing companies
- List of university presses
- Texas A&M University Press
- University of Texas Press
