= Irreducibility (disambiguation) =

Irreducibility is the philosophical principle that a complete account of an entity is not possible at lower levels of explanation.

Irreducibility may also refer to:

- Biological irreducibility, a creationist objection to evolution
- Irreducibility (mathematics), a concept in mathematics
- Computational irreducibility suggests certain computational processes cannot be simplified and the only way to determine the outcome of a process is to go through each step of its computation
