= Thorngate's postulate of commensurate complexity =

Thorngate's postulate of commensurate complexity, also referred to as Thorngate's impostulate of theoretical simplicity is the description of a phenomenon in social science theorizing. Karl E. Weick maintains that research in the field of social psychology can – at any one time – achieve only two of the three meta-theoretical virtues of "Generality", "Accuracy" and "Simplicity." One of these aspects therefore must always be subordinated to the others. The postulate is named for the Canadian social psychologist Warren Thorngate of the University of Alberta, whose work is quoted by Weick.

Thorngate described the problem this way:

'“In order to increase both generality and accuracy, the complexity of our theories must necessarily be increased.”

== Background ==
The postulate was a response to the debate among sociologists – mainly between Kenneth J. Gergen and Barry R. Schlenker – revolving around the meaning of sociological research. Whilst Schlenker appeared to maintain the position, that context only superficially influenced social behavior, Gergen appeared to maintain that context penetrated everything in social behavior, rendering observations as specific to the very situation observed. Thus, simplifying the discussion, the observation of social behavior would be no more than collecting historical data, since context would never be the same and the results would remain unique. In fact, sociology would be some specialized kind of historical research. Considering this, Thorngate writes

It is impossible for a theory of social behaviour to be simultaneously general, simple or parsimonious, and accurate.

— Warren Thorngate

The statement was confirmed by Gergen:

The more general a simple theory, the less accurate it will be in predicting specifics.

— Kenneth J. Gergen

== Weick's Interpretation ==
Weick represents this model “as a clockface with general at 12:00, accurate at 4:00, and simple at 8:00 to drive home the point that an explanation that satisfies any two characteristics is least able to satisfy the third characteristic.”

According to Weick, research operates in this continuum:

- if research that aims to be accurate and simple (6-o'clock), results would not be generally applicable.
- if research that aims to be general and simple (10-o'clock), results would not be accurate and
- if research that aims to be general and accurate (2-o'clock), results would not be simple any more.

Basically, Weick maintains, that there is a "trade-off" between these three virtues in such a way that only two can be achieved at any given time. Research therefore must operate in different modes to capture reality in sufficient precision and granularity. The postulate therefore becomes descriptive of research and prescriptive of research methodology.

== Criticism ==
Though confirming the postulate in general, Fred Dickinson, Carol Blair and Brian L. Ott criticized Weicks use of the word "accurate". Accuracy is hard to achieve, especially if the topic is difficult to qualify, e. g. in researching memory. They suggest replacing the term "accurate" with "interpretive utility".
