= Tahart =

Tahart (also written Tahat) is a village in the commune of Abalessa, in Tamanrasset Province, Algeria. It lies on Oued Outoul 37 kilometres (23 mi) west of Tamanrasset city.
