= Tin Amansagh =

- Village
- Location within Algeria
- Coordinates: 22°54′53″N 5°5′9″E
- Country: Algeria
- Province: Tamanrasset Province
- District: Abalessa District
- Commune: Abalessa
- Elevation: 1,012 m (3,320 ft)
- Time zone: UTC+1 (CET)

Tin Amansagh (also written Tin Amenserh or Ti-n-Emensar) is a village in the commune of Abalessa, in Tamanrasset Province, Algeria. It lies on the northern bank of Oued Abalessa 25 kilometres (16 mi) east of Abalessa town and 48 kilometres (30 mi) west of Tamanrasset.
