= Tefert El Fougania =

- Village
- Location within Algeria
- Coordinates: 22°50′2″N 4°55′58″E
- Country: Algeria
- Province: Tamanrasset Province
- District: Abalessa District
- Commune: Abalessa
- Elevation: 940 m (3,080 ft)
- Time zone: UTC+1 (CET)

Tefert El Fougania is a village in the commune of Abalessa, in Tamanrasset Province, Algeria. It lies on the southern bank of Oued Teffert 11 kilometres (6.8 mi) southeast of Abalessa town and 62 kilometres (39 mi) west of Tamanrasset.
