= Zero-Force Evolutionary Law =

The Zero-Force Evolutionary Law (ZFEL) is a theory proposed by Daniel McShea and Robert Brandon regarding the evolution of diversity and complexity. Under the ZFEL, diversity is understood as the variation among organisms and complexity as the variation among the parts within an organism. A part is understood as a system that is to some degree internally integrated and isolated from its surroundings. In a multicellular organism, for example, a cell is a part, and therefore complexity is the number of different cell types. Like the theory of relativity, the theory has a special and general formulation. The special formulation states that in the absence of natural selection, an evolutionary system with variation and heredity will tend spontaneously to diversify and complexify.

The general formulation states that evolutionary systems have a tendency to diversify and complexify, but that these processes may be amplified or constrained by other forces, including natural selection. The mechanism of the ZFEL is the inherently error-prone process of replication and reproduction. In the absence of selection, errors tend to accumulate, with the result that individuals within a population tend to become more different from each other (diversity) and parts within an individual tend to become more different from each other (complexity). Both of these tendencies can be overcome by selection, including stabilizing or negative selection, with the result that diversity or complexity often does not change, or even decreases. What the ZFEL offers is not so much a prediction as a null expectation, telling us what will happen in evolution when selection is absent. It is the analogue of Newton's law of momentum, which tells us the trajectory of a moving object in the absence of forces (a straight line).

== See also ==
- Constructive neutral evolution
- Evolution of biological complexity
- Neutral theory of molecular evolution
