= Issalissekine =

- Village
- Location within Algeria
- Coordinates: 22°50′50″N 5°6′19″E
- Country: Algeria
- Province: Tamanrasset Province
- District: Abalessa District
- Commune: Abalessa
- Elevation: 1,034 m (3,392 ft)
- Time zone: UTC+1 (CET)

Issalissekine is a village in the commune of Abalessa, in Tamanrasset Province, Algeria.
