= Iglène =

- Village
- Location within Algeria
- Coordinates: 22°54′6″N 4°53′53″E
- Country: Algeria
- Province: Tamanrasset Province
- District: Abalessa District
- Commune: Abalessa
- Elevation: 909 m (2,982 ft)
- Time zone: UTC+1 (CET)

Iglène is a village in the commune of Abalessa, in Tamanrasset Province, Algeria. It lies on the north bank of Oued Abalessa, and is connected to the N55A national highway by a local road to the west, near the town of Abalessa.
