= Tefert El Tahtania =

Tefert El Tahtania تيفرت
- Village
- Location within Algeria
- Coordinates: 22°51′22″N 4°54′39″E
- Country: Algeria
- Province: Tamanrasset Province
- District: Abalessa District
- Commune: Abalessa
- Elevation: 923 m (3,028 ft)
- Time zone: UTC+1 (CET)

Tefert El Tahtania is a village in the commune of Abalessa, in Tamanrasset Province, Algeria. It lies on the southern bank of Oued Teffert 8 kilometres (5.0 mi) southeast of Abalessa and 64 kilometres (40 mi) west of Tamanrasset.
