= Silet =

- Village
- Location within Algeria
- Coordinates: 22°39′47″N 4°34′42″E
- Country: Algeria
- Province: Tamanrasset Province
- District: Abalessa District
- Commune: Abalessa
- Elevation: 756 m (2,480 ft)

Population (2020)
  - Total: 1,800
- Time zone: UTC+1 (CET)

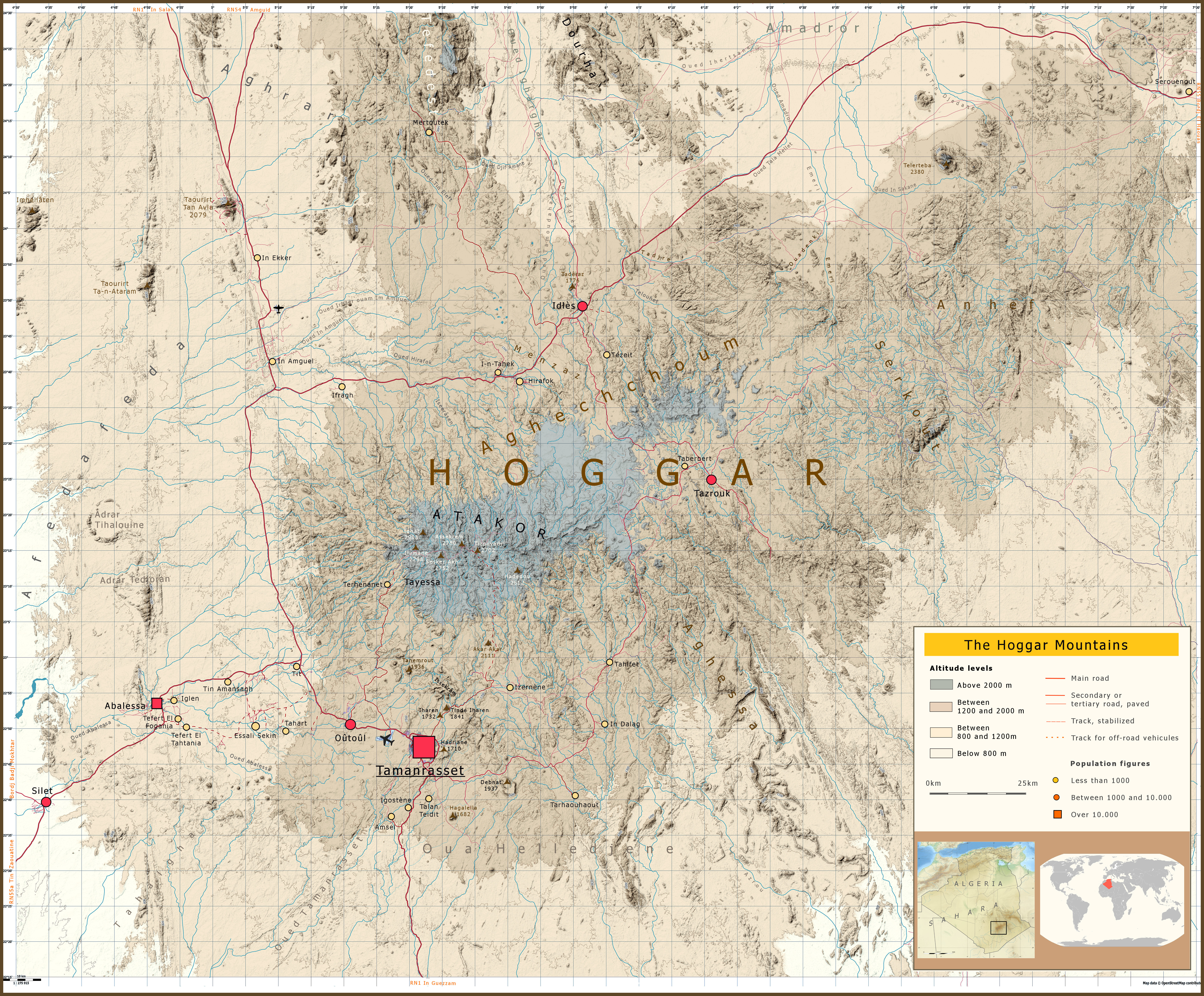
Map of the Hoggar Massif with Silet on the left edge of the map

Silet is a village in the commune of Abalessa, in Tamanrasset Province, Algeria. It is located on the N55A national highway 38 kilometres (24 mi) southwest of Abalessa and 100 kilometres (62 mi) west of Tamanrasset.
