= Abalessa =

Abalessa أبلسة
- Commune and town
- Location of Abalessa commune within Tamanrasset Province

- Location of Abalessa within Algeria
- Coordinates: 22°53′24″N 4°50′50″E
- Country: Algeria
- Province: Tamanrasset
- District: Abalessa (coextensive)

Government
  - PMA Seats: 7

Area
  - Total: 74,563 km^{2} (28,789 sq mi)
- Elevation: 909 m (2,982 ft)

Population (2008)
  - Total: 9,163
  - Density: 0.1229/km^{2} (0.3183/sq mi)
- Time zone: UTC+01 (CET)
- Postal code: 11120
- ONS code: 1102

Abalessa is a town and commune in Tamanrasset Province, in southern Algeria, coextensive with the district of the same name. According to the 2008 census it has a population of 9,163, up from 6,484 in 1998, with an annual growth rate of 3.6%. Abalessa is located along the ancient Trans-Saharan trade route, 80 kilometres (50 mi) west of the city of Tamanrasset, the capital of the province. The postcode of the town is 11120.

== History ==
The former capital of the Ahaggar, Abalessa is famous for the Tin Hinan Tomb. This 1,500 year old monumental grave is dedicated to the Tuareg matriarch Tin Hinan, and vestiges of a Tifinagh inscription have been found on one of its walls. According to Henri Lhote, the edifice may have built on top of an earlier Roman castrum since its architecture is different from the surrounding tombs and similar to that used by the Roman legionaries to construct their desert fortifications.

On 18 October 1927, Byron Khun de Prorok discovered a vault near Abalessa containing a skeleton, belonging to a woman, and her furniture. In his book Mysterious Sahara: The Land of Gold, of Sand, and of Ruin Khun de Prorok attributed the skeleton to Tin Hinan. Today, the skeleton is on display at the Bardo Museum in Algiers, while the monument where it was discovered continues to be a popular tourist attraction in Abalessa among visitors to the Tamanrasset.

== Geography ==
The municipality reaches an average elevation of approximately 909 metres (2,982 ft) above sea level. The main town lies at an elevation of 893 metres (2,930 ft), at the confluence of the two intermittent wadis Oued Rellachene and Oued Iheri. A rocky mountain range, part of the Ahaggar Mountains rises to the west of the town reaching about 1,200 metres (3,900 ft). There is significant vegetation in the river valleys; the area belongs to the West Saharan montane xeric woodlands ecoregion.

== Transportation ==
The N55A national highway, which branches off from the Trans-Sahara Highway (route N1) at Tit, is the main road through the area, passing just south of Abalessa.

== Education ==
4.6% of the population has a tertiary education, and another 12.4% has completed secondary education. The overall literacy rate is 78.7%, and is 85.4% among males and 70.8% among females.

== Localities ==
The commune is composed of eight localities:

- Abalessa
- Silet
- Iglène
- Tefert El Fougania
- Tefert El Tahtania
- Tin Amansagh
- Daghmouli
- Issalissekine
- Tahart
- In Azarou
