= Brian L. Ott =

Professor at Texas Tech University

Personal details
- Education: George Mason University (BA); The Pennsylvania State University (MA, PhD)
- Occupation: Scholar, author

Brian L. Ott is an American scholar of media and communication and Distinguished Professor in the Department of Communication, Media, Journalism, and Film at Missouri State University. His research focuses on rhetoric, media studies, and the cultural and political implications of communication technologies, particularly the rhetorical dynamics of social media platforms. Ott is known for his scholarship on digital media, political communication, and public memory, and for co-authoring the book The Twitter Presidency: Donald J. Trump and the Politics of White Rage.

Ott earned his bachelor's degree from George Mason University, a master's degree and PhD from The Pennsylvania State University. He is a contributor for Newsweek, Salon, The Hill, USA Today and other publications.

== Research ==
Ott’s scholarship is situated in the fields of rhetoric, media studies, and communication studies. His work examines how communication technologies influence public discourse, political culture and civic identity. A central theme in Ott’s work is the relationship between media form and political expression. His research argues that the design features of digital platforms shape rhetorical style and patterns of political engagement. He has written extensively about the communicative culture of platforms such as Twitter and their influence on contemporary political rhetoric. Ott has also written on topics including television culture, digital media, museums and memorials, and the rhetoric of public memory.

== Public Commentary ==
Ott has written commentary on media and politics for outlets including USA Today, Newsweek, Salon, and The Hill. His scholarship and commentary have been cited or discussed in reporting by publications such as The New York Times and The Washington Post as well as by the Associated Press.

== Selected publications ==
- The Twitter presidency: Donald J. Trump and the politics of White Rage with Greg Dickinson. Routledge, New York, 2019. ISBN 978-0367149758
- Critical Media Studies: An Introduction with Robert Mack. Wiley-Blackwell, Malden, 2014. ISBN 978-1118553978
- The Routledge Reader in Rhetorical Criticism with Greg Dickinson. Routledge, New York, 2013. ISBN 978-0415517553
- Places of public memory: The rhetoric of museums and memorials with Carole Blair and Greg Dickinson. University of Alabama Press, Tuscaloosa, 2010. ISBN 978-0817356132
- It's Not Tv: Watching HBO in the Post-Television Era with Cara Louise Buckley and Mark Leverette. Routledge, New York, 2010. ISBN 978-0415960380
- The small screen: How television equips us to live in the Information Age. Wiley-Blackwell, Malden, 2007. ISBN 978-1405161558
