= Logan Medal of the Arts =

- Description: Award for contributions to American art
- Country: United States
- Presented by: Art Institute of Chicago

The Logan Medal of the Arts was an arts prize initiated in 1907 and associated with the Art Institute of Chicago, the Frank G Logan family and the Society for Sanity in Art. From 1917 through 1940, 270 awards were given for contributions to American art.

== History ==
The Medal was named for arts patron Frank Granger Logan (1851–1937), founder of the brokerage house of Logan & Bryan, who served over 50 years on the board of the Chicago Art Institute. He founded the Logan Museum of Anthropology at Beloit College where he was a trustee. He and his wife, Josephine Hancock Logan, administered the award consistent with their patronage of the Society for Sanity in Art, which they founded in 1936, and the theme of her 1937 book Sanity in Art. The Logans strongly opposed all forms of modern art, including cubism, surrealism, and abstract expressionism. It was not unknown for the Society of Sanity in Art to award a prize (e.g. in 1938 to Rudolph F. Ingerle) in competition with the official award by the exhibition prize committee of a prize the Logans had already sponsored. The Logans were the in-laws of the renowned Chicago financier, Frank C. Rathje.

The Logans sponsored several prizes in their name. The Mr. and Mrs. Frank G Logan prize was awarded to a jury-selected exhibit at the American Paintings and Sculpture Exhibitions held in Chicago, and a similarly named prize was awarded to a local artist at the annual Chicago and Vicinity Exhibition for a selected exhibit. Frank G Logan prizes were also awarded at exhibitions of prints by the Chicago Society of Etchers, the annual International Watercolor Exhibition and the annual International Lithography and Wood Engraving Exhibition, all held at the Chicago Art Institute. Logan prizes were also awarded by the Society for Sanity in Art at exhibitions in California. Recipients of these prizes are listed below.

== Recipients ==
=== Logan Medal of the Arts ===
This is an incomplete list, please help us by updating it.

- 1907: Albin Polasek
- 1920: Marguerite Zorach
- 1924: Frank Weston Benson
- 1926: Charles Hopkinson
- 1926: Bror Julius Olsson Nordfeldt
- 1927: William Zorach
- 1928: Maurice Sterne
- 1929: David Smith
- 1930: Theodore Roszak
- 1932: George William Eggers
- 1933: Santiago Martínez Delgado
- 1934: Peterpaul Ott, sculpture
- 1935: Doris Lee
- c1937: Willem de Kooning
- 1938: Norman MacLeish
- 1938: Rudolph Frank Ingerle
- 1939: Gladys Curtis Simpson
- 1940: Lawrence Adams
- 1964: Harry Bouras (sculpture)
- Gutzon Borglum
- James Brooks
- Howard Norton Cook
- Frederic Milton Grant
- Emil Holzhauer
- Charles Wheeler Locke
- Frank Moore

=== Mr and Mrs Frank G. Logan prize ($1000-$1500) ===
Formerly awarded at the annual American Paintings and Sculpture Exhibition, Chicago
Source: Art Institute of Chicago

- 1917: Albin Polasek for Bust of Charles W. Hawthorne (bronze) (first award)
- 1918: Wayman Adams for Joseph Pennell
- 1919: Leon Kroll for Leo Ornstein at the Piano
- 1920: George B. Luks for Otis Skinner
- 1921: Cecilia Beaux for The Dancing Lesson
- 1922: Frank Weston Benson for Still Life Decoration ($1500)
- 1923: George Bellows for Portrait of my Mother
- 1924: Eugene F. Savage for Recessional ($1500)
- 1925: Albin Polasek for Unfettered (sculpture) ($1500)
- 1926: George Luks for The Player
- 1927: John E. Costigan for A Summer Day
- 1928: Arthur B. Carles for Arrangement
- 1929: John Storrs for Two Figures (sculpture)
- 1930: Louis Ritman for Jullien
- 1931: William Zorach for Mother and Child (sculpture) ($1500)
- 1932: Sidney Laufman for Landscape (last award)

=== Mr and Mrs Frank G. Logan Medal ($2500) ===
Formerly awarded at the annual American Paintings and Sculpture Exhibition, Chicago
Source: Art Institute of Chicago

- 1928: William E.C. Morgan (UK) for engraving.
- 1928: J. Theodore Johnson for The Black Mantilla ($2500) (first award)
- 1929: Alexander Brook for Children's Lunch ($2500)
- 1930: Heinz Warneke for The Water Carrier
- 1931: Morris Kantor for Haunted House ($2500)
- 1932: Nikolay Cikovsky for Pigeons (last award)

=== Mr and Mrs Frank G. Logan Art Institute Medal ($500-$2000) ===
Awarded at the annual American Paintings and Sculpture Exhibition, Chicago
Source: Art Institute of Chicago

- 1935: Doris Lee for Thanksgiving (first award)
- 1936: Robert Philipp for Olympia
- 1937: Aaron Bohrod for Wyoming Landscape
- 1941: Hannah Small for Curled Figure ($500) (sculpture)
- 1943: George Constant for First Gift ($500)
- 1948: Theodore Roszak for Spectre of Kitty Hawk ($500)
- 1951: Willem de Kooning for Excavation; Theodore Roszak for Sea Quarry ($1000)
- 1954: Conrad Marca-Relli for his Seated Figure ($2000); Naum Gabo for Construction in Space ($1000)
- 1960: Isamu Noguchi for The Self ($2000); Louise Nevelson for Construction in 3 sections ($1000)
- 1962: Loren Maciver
- 1963: Hans Hofmann for The Golden Wall; Mark di Suvero (sculpture)
- 1964: Stuart Davis for Standard Brand;Al Held
- 1966: George Segal for The Truck
- 1969: Karl Wirsum for Screaming Jay Hawks ($1500)
- 1974: Andy Warhol for Mao
- 1976: Robert Rauschenberg for Flood (Hoarfrost)

=== Mr and Mrs Frank G. Logan Art Institute Prize ($500-$2000) ===
Awarded at the Chicago and Vicinity annual exhibition
Source: Art Institute of Chicago

- 1917: Walter Ufer for In the land of mañana ($500); Victor Higgins for Juanita and the suspicious cat ($200) (first award)
- 1918: Victor Higgins for Fiesta day ($500); Emil Zettler for Woman and child (sculpture) ($200)
- 1919: Frank A. Werner for Louis H. Sullivan ($500); Karl A. Buehr for Farson's Creek($200)
- 1920: Paul Bartlett for Drizzly day ($500); Carl R. Krafft for Banks of the Gasconade($200)
- 1921: Frank V. Dudley for Duneland ($500); Anna Lee Stacey for Thé dansant ($200)
- 1922: Albin Polasek for Man chiseling his own destiny ($500); Samuel Glasstorner for Repentance (sculpture) ($200)
- 1923: Frederick V. Poole for Flora ($500); William P. Henderson for Querena ($200)
- 1924: Leopold Seyffert for A portrait ($500); John F. Stacey for From an Essex Hillside, Conn ($200)
- 1925: Carl R. Krafft for Nocturne ($500);Archibald John Motley, Jnr for A Mulatress ($200)
- 1926: George Oberteuffer for Portrait of my wife ($500); Frederic M. Grant for Departure of Marco Polo ($200)
- 1927: H. Amiard Oberteuffer for The yellow dress ($750); Marques E. Reitzel for The morning route ($500)
- 1928: Paul Trebilcock for Portrait of a painter ($750); J. Theodore Johnson for Mary ($500)
- 1929: W. Vladimir Rouseff for In the open ($750);Edmund Giesbert for Uphill ($500)
- 1930: Davenport Griffen for Sleep ($750);Marshall D. Smith for West Van Buren Street ($500)
- 1931: J. Theodore Johnson for Bistro Bruel ($750); Edouard Chassaing for Black Panther (sculpture) ($500)
- 1932: Claude Buck for Girl reading ($750);Frances Foy for Betty ($500)
- 1933: Francis Chapin for Pink House; Laura van Pappelendam for Long Haired Cactus
- 1934: Peterpaul Ott for The Dancer, Harald Kreutzberg (sculpture) ($750)
- 1935: Edouard Chassaing for Head of E.L. Heitkamp (sculpture)
- 1936: Constantine Pougialis for Russian dancer
- 1937: Carl Hallsthammar for Venus in Red Cherry ($500)
- 1938: Norman MacLeish for Watertown
- 1939: Maeble Perry Edwards for Portrait of L.L. Valentine (sculpture)
- 1940: Lawrence Adams for West Side in Winter
- 1941: Joseph P. Gualtieri for Mario ($500)
- 1942: Abbott Lawrence Pattison for Kneeling Women ($500)
- 1943: Sidney Loeb for Abraham Lincoln (sculpture) ($500)
- 1944: Edgar Miller for City Detail ($500); Margo Hoff for In the Cathedral ($300)
- 1945: Aaron Bohrod for Joan of Arc in Montebourg
- 1946: John Wallace Purcell for Michele Verbrugghen (sculpture) ($500)
- 1947: Mitchell Siporin for End of an Era ($500)
- 1948: Gustav Dalstrom for Portrait ($500)
- 1949: Egon Wiener for Torso in wood (sculpture) ($500)
- 1950: Suzanne Martyl for View of Galena ($500)
- 1951: Joyce Treiman for Escape ($500)
- 1952: Don Yacoe for Nationalism ($500)
- 1953: Margo Hoff for Stage Fright ($1000)
- 1954: No exhibition
- 1955: Joseph Goto for Struggle ($1500) (sculpture); Gerald W McLaughlin for The Orator and the Ladies ($1000)
- 1956: Anna P. Baker for High Frequency ping ($1500); Richard Hunt for Construction D (£1000) (sculpture)
- 1957: Eleanor Coen for Growing City ($1500);Robert James Anderson for Yesterday, Today and Tomorrow ($1000)
- 1958: Keith Boyle for White Frozen Forms ($1500); Carl E. Schwartz for The Card Players
- 1959: Richard Talaber for Ferous Confine ($1500); Harry Brorby ($1000)
- 1960: Eleanor Coen for Visitation ($2000); Constance Teander Cohen for Procession ($1500)
- 1961: William Baziotes for The Sea (£2000); Edouardo Paolozzi for Large Frog (sculpture) ($1000)
- 1962: George Kokines for Embracement #1 ($2000);James Rosati for sculpture
- 1963:
- 1964: Michael Hurson for an untitled painting ($2000); Belle Sanford for The Apprentice (bronze) ($1000)
- 1965: Tom Parish
- 1966: Irene Siegel for The Family ($1000);Douglas D. Craft for Alone of a Love not Wanting ($500); Joseph J. Rozman for Caudro Tablero ($250)
- 1967: Gladys Nilsson for Very Worldly ($2000); Leanne Shreves Stevenson for Events ($1500) (not exhibited due to controversy)
- 1968: Mel Theobald; Lynne Cohen for Reconstruction 1 ($500)
- 1969: Thomas Shannon for Mexo-O (sculpture)
- 1970: No exhibition
- 1971: Robert Lostutter for his watercolour ($500)
- 1972: No exhibition
- 1973: Stephen Carlson for Untitled ($1000); Bill Moll for Zoo Scene ($1000); Roy Schnackenberg for The Twelve Złoty Balthus ($1000); Jayme Curley for Potato Fields ($500)
- 1974: No exhibition
- 1975: Alice Shaddle for Gardener ($1000); Mary Stoppert for Solo ($1000); Terrence Karpowicz for Suspended Glass from Black Box over White Sand ($1000)
- 1976: No exhibition
- 1977: Roger Brown for The Entry of Christ into Chicago, 1976 ($1000); Vera Berdich for Recurring Themes ($1000); Robert M. Donley for Helen and her Suitors ($1000)
- 1978: No prize awarded
- 1979: No exhibition
- 1980: Michael J. Buglewicz for Myth ($1000); Steve Mose for Untitled; Filemon Santiago for La Casa de los Espantos ($1000)
- 1981: No exhibition
- 1982:
- 1983: No exhibition
- 1984: Paul Lamantia for Day thru Evening dream ($1000); Mark Jackson for Out of the Darkness ($1000); Hollis Sigler for The World is Endless Desire ($1000)

=== Frank G Logan Prize ===
Awarded at the Chicago Society of Etchers exhibition

- 1922 Cleo Damianakes for "Fountain"; Sears Gallagher for "Maine Coast"; Robert F. Logan for "Pont Marie, Paris"; and J. W. Winkler
- 1923 Edward Hopper for East Side Interior
- 1925 Louis Conrad Rosenberg
- 1927 Louis Conrad Rosenberg

=== Frank G Logan Prize ===
Awarded by the Society for Sanity in Art, California.

- 1940 Anna Wilson
- 1940 Frank Tolles Chamberlin
- 1942 Edward Bruce Douglas
- 1944 Frank Montague Moore

== Sources ==
- Rudolph Ingerle (1879–1950): Paintings of the Ozarks, the Great Smoky Mountains and the 1933 Century of progress Exposition (Chicago: Aaron Galleries, 2000)
