= Doris Lee =

American painter

Doris Emrick Lee
- Doris Lee circa 1935-1937
- Born: February 1, 1905; Aledo, Illinois, U.S.
- Died: June 16, 1983 (aged 78); Clearwater, Florida, U.S.
- Education: Kansas City Art Institute, California School of Fine Arts
- Known for: Painting, printmaking
- Spouses: Russell Lee, Arnold Blanch
- Awards: Logan Medal of the Arts
- Patrons: Works Progress Administration, Michigan State University, Colorado Springs Fine Art Center

Doris Emrick Lee (February 1, 1905 – June 16, 1983) was an American painter known for her figurative painting and printmaking. She won the Logan Medal of the Arts from the Chicago Art Institute in 1935. She is known as one of the most successful female artists of the Depression era in the United States.

== Biography and career ==
Lee was born in Aledo, Illinois and attended Ferry Hall School, a preparatory school for girls in Lake Forest, Illinois, from 1920 to 1922. She graduated from Rockford College in 1927 and studied with the American Impressionist and Ashcan School painter Ernest Lawson at the Kansas City Art Institute in 1929. At the institute, she also met painter, Arnold Blanch whom she later married after her 1939 divorce from Russell Lee. Lee also attended the California School of Fine Arts in San Francisco in 1930. After her schooling, Lee moved to Woodstock, New York and established herself as an artist in that community and settled there for the remainder of her artistic career.

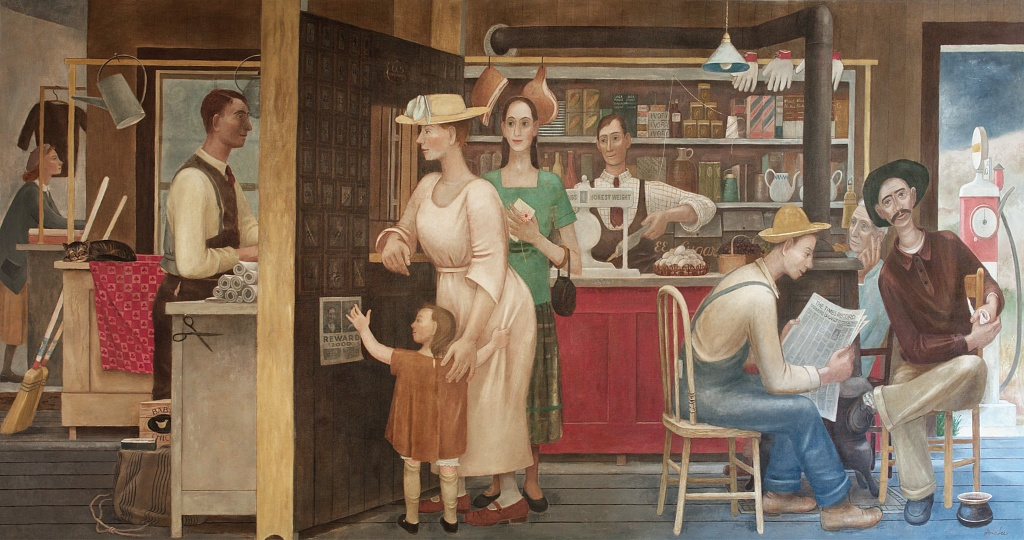
General Store and Post Office (1938), mural by Doris Emrick Lee at the Clinton Federal Building, Washington, D.C.

During the 1930s, she was commissioned to create several murals by the United States Treasury Department in Washington, DC. In 1937, Lee painted two murals in the Main Post Office in Washington, DC, and another in the Summerville, Georgia, Post Office. That same year the Metropolitan Museum of Art acquired her 1936 painting Catastrophe for its permanent collection. Her 1935 painting "Noon", was referenced in Vladimir Nabokov's book Lolita. During the 1930s and 1940s she created a number of lithographs for the Associated American Artists. During the late 1940s and early 1950s, Lee undertook several commissions for Life magazine, including articles and illustrations on travel to such places as North Africa, Mexico, and Cuba. During this time, her work became much more stylized with more concern to color and pure forms.

She taught at Michigan State University and was invited to attend Colorado Springs Fine Arts Center as a guest artist.

During the 1960s, Lee retired from painting and later died in Clearwater, Florida, in 1983. In addition to the Art Institute of Chicago, the Rhode Island School of Design, and The Metropolitan Museum of Art, Lee's work can be found in many public collections, including the Whitney Museum of American Art, Phillips Collection, Washington, DC, Cleveland Museum of Art, Pennsylvania Academy of the Fine Arts, National Museum of Women in the Arts, and the Greenville County Museum of Art, Greenville, South Carolina. A traveling retrospective entitled "Simple Pleasures: The Art of Doris Lee", is planned for 2021-2023, and a related exhibit is at the Wigmore Fine Art Gallery in Manhattan in January 2022.

== Thanksgiving ==
In 1935, Doris Lee's bustling scene of women preparing a Thanksgiving feast became the object of national headlines when it was first exhibited at the Chicago Art Institute and won the prestigious Logan Medal of the Arts. The themes of Thanksgiving, rural customs, and family life, which Lee painted in a deliberately folksy manner, would have had great appeal to a country still in the midst of the national devastation of the Great Depression. Her painting offered a quaint model of domesticity that appealed to those who were tired of the complication of modern life in the 1930s. To a generation exhausted with the trials of economic hard times, the return to a simpler past became more desirable as the search for a new national identity continued. Her work received public and critical acclaim for its earthy qualities and sense of humor. One critic described her paintings as "fresh, with the charm of innocence". Thanksgiving celebrates the joys of family ties. The bustling kitchen is filled with life and love as a group of women prepares the annual feast. Yet Josephine Logan, the donor of the prize, condemned the work's broad, exaggerated style and founded the conservative Society for Sanity in Art movement in response. This controversy only brought Lee fame, and Thanksgiving has been recognized as one of the most popular nostalgic views of this American ritual.

== Awards ==
Lee was awarded the Logan Medal of the Arts at the 46th American Exhibition of Painting and Sculpture at the Art Institute of Chicago.
