= Byron Khun de Prorok =

American archaeologist

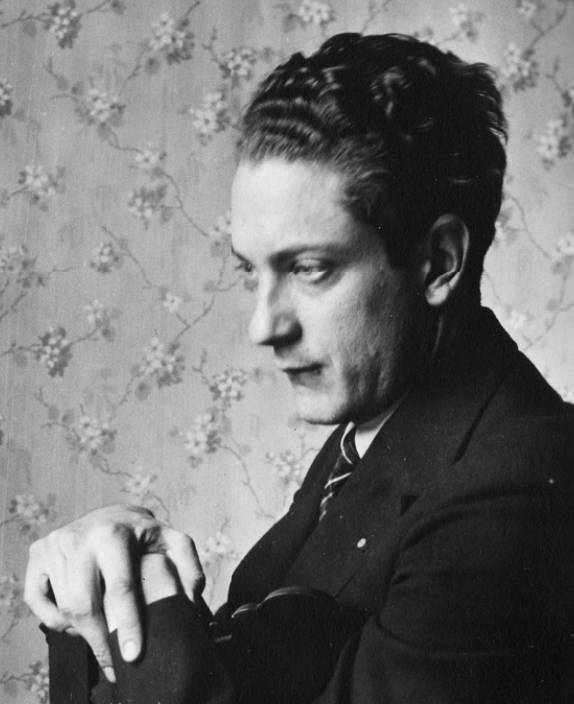
Byron Khun de Prorok

"Count" Byron Khun de Prorok (October 6, 1896 – November 20, 1954, born in Mexico City as Francis Victor Kuhn) was a Hungarian-American amateur archaeologist, anthropologist, and author of four travelogues. He has come to be regarded as a tomb raider, or grave robber, opening up graves and tombs and removing remains and artefacts against the wishes of those laying claim to them.

Count Byron De Prorok was educated at the University of Geneva. He worked on the excavations at Carthage from 1920 to 1925 and held the Archaeological Institute of America's prestigious Norton Lectureship in 1922–1923.

During the later 1920s and early 1930s, Prorok undertook a series of expeditions in Africa of dubious scientific value, pursuing ancient legends and eventually came to believe he had found evidence that proved Atlantis lay in North Africa, the true location of the fabled Biblical land of Ophir and what he supposed were the ruins of an ancient temple where Alexander the Great "became a god". In addition to these tremendous 'discoveries' he also claimed to be a member of the Order of the Holy Sepulchre, the Royal Archaeological Institute and The Royal Geographical Society.

His numerous critics say that this "count" Byron de Prorok was neither a real count nor an archaeologist, was expelled from The Royal Geographical Society (allegedly in 1932), who had "a vivid imagination" and "was given to gross exaggeration". He was, however, an active member of the Adventurers' Club of New York.

Regardless of his archaeological faults, De Prorok was a pioneer in using motion pictures, which he did first in 1920. However, only one of his films is known to survive, Ancient Trails in North Africa.

His published works include Digging for Lost African Gods (1926), Mysterious Sahara: The Land of Gold, of Sand and of Ruin (1929), Dead Men Do Tell Tales (1933) and In Quest of Lost Worlds (1935).

== Exploration of the Hoggar Mountains and discovery of the tomb of Tin Hinan, 1925 ==
De Prorok excavated the Tin Hinan Tomb in 1925, the monumental grave belonging to the 4th-century BC Tuareg matriarch Tin Hinan, whose remains he uncovered and controversially extracted.

From a Tuareg point of view, Prorok was a graverobber who desecrated the tomb of a revered ancestor.

The expedition into the Sahara included Maurice Reygasse, Alonzo W. Pond of the Logan Museum of Anthropology, W. Bradley Tyrrell, a colleague of Pond's from Beloit College, Mr. Denny of The New York Times, a motion picture operator, an interpreter, two native guides and a native chef. Alonzo Pond is said to have found Prorok "difficult".

The expedition was launched from Algiers in October 1925 and using motor vehicles for transport headed south towards the Hoggar Mountains.

We hoped to find something in the Sahara which would throw a useful light not only upon the commerce of the ancient cities of the coast but also, perhaps, upon the very origin of man and the beginnings of Libyo-Phoenician civilisation where we were told, on authority that is not so assured as it perhaps might be, that there are buried cities and strange races. It is a land of myth and mystery.

Prorok was particularly excited about discovering lost people deep in the Sahara in quest that echoes past searches for Prester John. He hoped to encounter inhabitants of the Hoggar Mountains who were, he had come to believe, "a mysterious people, tall, straight and slender, who regard themselves as the greatest of all races with similarity to the Egyptians as represented on the ancient tombs of the Pharaohs."

In October 1925 the expedition arrived in Touggourt and entered the Sahara at El Kantara and "from here we began the long plunge of a thousand miles of desert to the Hoggar, in whose valleys are white people of magnificent physique and classic features, whose origin is a mystery, and on which they themselves have steadfastly refused to give any information."

Prorok writes much about the Tuareg people whom he describes as "a strange people" whose "impetuosity in attack has made them dreaded throughout the Sahara".

At Ouargla the expedition halted to view ancient ruins and got lost in the desert. Prorok was particularly grateful to the assistance the expedition received from French soldiers based at the oasis, commenting in his particular style, "Ouargla itself must stand as the monument to the French administration who are doing a work in the Sahara as stupendous as anything ever attempted by the Romans in Africa." Taking leads from the soldiers the expedition visited Gara Krima which was "an old stronghold of the pirates of the Sahara from whence they scanned the desert, sweeping down whenever a caravan was signalled, and raiding the country far and wide."

The expedition then left Ouargla but soon broke down in the sand (and having to be rescued by French soldiers again) before eventually arriving at the desert Oasis of In Salah. From here they travelled "beyond civilisation" to Tamanrasset where they received the dramatic news that they had narrowly missed "five hundred rebel raiders moving on the Hoggar from southern Morocco; the strongest armed force loose in the desert since the war."

In Tamanrasset they were received by "all the Tuareg chiefs of the vicinity headed by Amenokal Akhamouk, the king of all the Hoggar...and the French forces, headed by Commandant Count Beaumont" and it was here the expedition divided with Pond, Reygasse and "King" Amenokal heading north to further study Tuareg culture. Prorok accompanied by a body of twenty Tuaregs went in search of "a vast pyramidical mound located in the southern stretch of the range, among peaks seven thousand feet high" which he believed was the lost tomb of the "Mother of all the Tuaregs", Tin Hinan.

On 18 October 1925, Byron Khun de Prorok and his team located the fabled tomb in the oasis village of Abalessa. Of this discovery de Prorok says, "The finding of the Tomb took several days, for the Tuaregs were suspicious of our intent. The negroes, however, on being asked where was the great tomb answered by a pointing of the hand in the direction south. This was the way we found the location of the vast mound."

On the north side, the principal tomb had suffered the least damage and it was possible to recognize the skilled craftsmanship of the builders. This wall, relatively intact, rose some twenty to twenty-five feet from the base, but what was the type of the superstructure, or how much higher it carried, it is not possible to say, for the roof had at some time caved in, and the whole area was littered by a great mass of loose rocks, hewn boulders, and sand. The outer walls of the tomb must have covered an area of sixty by ninety feet, and later we discovered that the walls themselves were about three feet thick at the highest remaining point. The walls of the smaller tombs were from eighteen inches to two feet thick.

During the excavation of the tomb that followed a thunderstorm is alleged to have occurred which caused "great terror among the natives". Work continued with new diggers and at last the condition of the grave of Tin Hinan was revealed and described by de Prorok, thus;

Whoever the personage was, whether Tin Hinan or one of her peers, she had been given the utmost honour in her death. Her jewelry was indicative of her rank, and in the antechamber of her tomb lay her clothing neatly piled, and ready for her use beyond the shadows. Here were garments of leather, painted red and yellow, as well as clothing of cotton and other fabrics, in various colours, ornamented by intricate fringes. No weapons were found, but food for her journey was by her, dates dried to the thinnest film of skin on the stone, and a store of what looked to have been grapes, together with jars of grain.

Despite protests from both Tuareg and "negro" tribes the expedition removed all the bones and treasures and took them back to the Ethnographical Museum in Algiers, where they remain on display.

== Journey from Egypt to Abyssinia and the search for King Solomon's Mines, c. 1925–33 ==
Prorok's next 'adventures' were published in Dead Men Do Tell Tales (1933) and were sensationally detailed in Modern Mechanix Magazine in 1936 describing the author's "fifteen year search" for the fabled mines of King Solomon in Ethiopia during the period preceding the Second Italo-Abyssinian War.

In the book dramatic exploits are revealed by Prorok who describes how "after endless formalities and diplomatic action" the Ethiopian emperor Haile Selassie gave his team "the first permission ever given to white men" to explore the "forbidden land" of the Blue Nile. While in Abyssinia (now called Ethiopia), Prorok describes extraordinary temperatures and his attempts to avoid a confrontation with a powerful and reputedly hostile sultan in the Benishangul-Gumuz Region who may have been a remnant of the defunct Sennar (sultanate),

The Old Man of the Mountain, dread Solomon Ghogoli, Sultan of the Shangul. He was over 100 years old, maintained many wives and was, it was rumoured, the owner of secret gold mines which no white man had ever seen. Never was he known to permit a European or American to visit his vast, savage realm...for three terrible days we trekked across the enormous canyons and great mountains of this legendary land. Even in the shade our thermometers registered from 140 to 160 degrees Fahrenheit, so much greater than the heat of the human body that we were actually able to cool our hands by clamping them under our armpits. The merciless heat once reached 167 degrees, three-fourths as hot as boiling water. Our porters were terror-stricken. They were fearful of being caught and killed by the savage sultan. No wonder many of them deserted.

According to the tale Prorok managed to find some mines and then excavated some ancient tombs before hearing of the local sultan – whom they feared – gathering his men. The team hastily packed their specimens and fled down the Dabus River to "Albi Moti", hoping for a promised Ethiopian military escort awaiting there with their official passports. This help was eventually forthcoming and Prorok dramatically relates how the previously hostile Sultan thus humbled attempts to make amends for his ignorant errors, with the author concluding characteristically:

He showed us many things no white man had ever seen before: his most valuable golden idols, dating back many centuries, which his slaves had dug up in the surrounding region; also a number of huge, rough diamonds. We in turn were quite willing to offer presents. And maybe we didn’t bless Haile Selassie! His name was indeed powerful in that wild stronghold of barbarism.

It was here that Prorok became convinced that this area between Sudan and Ethiopia was the legendary land of Ophir of Biblical fame, whence came the gold, frankincense and other treasures for Solomon’s celebrated temple in Jerusalem. He also believed that he had discovered the oldest and richest of gold mines and the "prime cause" of the Second Italo-Abyssinian War.

== Selected bibliography ==
- Khun de Prorok, Byron (1926). Digging for Lost African Gods: The Record of Five Years Archaeological Excavation in North Africa. New York: G. P. Putnam's Sons. <https://archive.org/details/diggingforlostaf009795mbp
- Khun de Prorok, Byron (1929). Mysterious Sahara: The Land of Gold, of Sand and of Ruin. Narrative Press, rep. 2004.
- Khun de Prorok, Byron (1933). Dead Men Do Tell Tales: A 1933 Archeological Expedition into Abyssinia. London: George G. Harrap & Co. Ltd, rep. 1943.
- Khun de Prorok, Byron (1935). In Quest of Lost Worlds:: Five Archeological Expeditions 1925–1934. London: E.P. Dutton & Co. (Most of the material he has recycled from his 1926 text.)
