= Marion Lerner-Levine =

- Born: Marion Lerner; October 31, 1931; Hackney, London, England
- Died: October 26, 2023 (aged 91)
- Education: University of Chicago, Art Institute of Chicago, California State College, Los Angeles
- Known for: Painting, watercolor, printmaking
- Spouse: Arthur Levine

Marion Lerner-Levine (born Marion Lerner, October 31, 1931 – October 26, 2023) was a British-born American painter, printmaker, and teacher who created "emotionally expressive" still life paintings in oil and watercolor, which "transform the traditional form of the still life into whimsical portraits of everyday life."

== Early life and education ==
Marion Lerner-Levine was born in Hackney, London, England on October 31, 1931, as the daughter of a Polish mother and a Romanian father, LSE economist Abba Lerner. When she was six years old, the family emigrated to the United States because her father was offered a Rockefeller Foundation grant to study economics.

At the age of 16, while living with her parents and twin brother in Chicago, Lerner-Levine was granted early entrance to the University of Chicago. In 1950, she furthered her education at the School of the Art Institute of Chicago, where she studied with Paul Weighardt, Laura Van Pappelendam, Max Kahn, and Vera Berdich. During her final year at the Art Institute, she concurrently studied etching and lithography at the Chicago Graphic Workshop. In 1954, Lerner-Levine earned a Bachelor of Fine Arts degree at the Art Institute of Chicago, with honors in printmaking and painting. She later studied at University of California, Los Angeles (1967–68).

Upon the completion of her education, Lerner-Levine married the artist Arthur Levine (b. 1928); they have two daughters.

== Work and professional life ==
Although Lerner-Levine painted houses and yards while living in California, she turned to still life in 1968, when she and her and her family moved to Staten Island. In 1971, Lerner-Levine began to exhibit seriously after joining the Prince Street Gallery in New York City, which gave her with the opportunity to present her work as “worthy of serious consideration.” At that time, the definitive character of her art began to emerge. Her detailed “tablescapes,” as she describes them, feature oblique views of unconventional objects that she has collected. Her oil paintings usually represent arrangements of brightly colored objects, offset by strong areas of white, that are clustered in a manner reminiscent of Giorgio Morandi. Del Gaizo (1975), for example, features ordinary household items—canned goods—arrayed in a seemingly chaotic pattern, similar to what one might find in any kitchen, which Carolee Thea described as "amusing" and "outside the realm of any pop-art stigma."

For Lerner-Levine, the poetic and visual impact of an appealing arrangement of forms is most important, "turning description into interpretation." Her paintings and watercolors are typically meticulous in rhythm and texture. Even when painting similar groups of objects, each work has its own variation of light, color, and composition. Anselm Hollo recognized her "confidence in objects and a calm contemplative delight in them. In their ordering, arrangement, reflection onto a painted surface, they make us look at true objects—things, opposed to commodities—anew."

In the 1980s, Lerner-Levine was given solo exhibitions at the Albright–Knox Art Gallery, Springfield Art Museum, and Butler Institute of American Art, among others. Through these exhibitions, she solidified an artistic reputation that set her apart from other artists in her genre. After leaving Prince Street Gallery in 1986, Lerner-Levine returned in 1992. Lerner-Levine has had more than 20 solo exhibitions and participated in numerous group shows in New York and throughout the United States. Her work is in the permanent collections of the Brooklyn Museum, Bates College Museum of Art, Rowan University Art Gallery, Bellevue Hospital Center, Bank of America, and many others.

For years, Lerner-Levine also worked as a teacher at various institutions, including Brooklyn College, University of California at Los Angeles, Educational Alliance Art School, School of the Art Institute of Chicago, and Southwest Missouri State University.

== Death ==
Lerner-Levine died on October 26, 2023, five days before her 92nd birthday.
