= Society of Western Artists =

The Society of Western Artists refers to two distinct and wholly unrelated organizations in the history of American art: New Location: 527 San Mateo Avenue, San Bruno, CA 94066 650-225-9250 As of April 1, 2015

- Society of Western Artists (1896-1914)
- Society of Western Artists (1939-Present)
