= Jennings Tofel =

Polish-American painter (1891-1959)

Jennings (Yehuda) Tofel (originally Idel Taflewicz or Taflowicz) (born 18 October 1891 in Tomaszów Mazowiecki, Poland, died 7 September 1959 in New York City), Jewish American painter, poet and essayist.

== Family ==
He was born in Tomaszów Mazowiecki (now in Poland) in a Jewish middle-class family as Idel Taflewicz (or Taflowicz). His father Jacob Josef Taflewicz/Taflowicz (b. 1864) was a woman dress's tailor in Tomaszów Mazowiecki and had his own workshop in home. Jennings's mother was Alta Haya née Berliner (d. 1899).

He had three elder sisters: Itta (Yetta) (b. 1882), Zelda (b. 1884) and Mechla (b. 1886) and three younger brethren: Israel Izaak (b. 1894), Gedalya (b. 1896) and Hil Laib (b. 1898).

== Childhood in Tomaszów Mazowiecki and Łódź ==
After the death of Idel's mother (1899), his father replaced with the family to Łódź and after some months he returned to the native town Tomaszów Mazowiecki. Idel as a 10-year boy had been injured and a month later his father noted his son's "raised shoulder". In his fall, a bone had been fractured, and Idel would have a deformed body for the rest of his life.

== Immigration ==
In 1905 Jacob Josef Taflewicz immigrated with the family to New York, where they were reunited with other relatives. In New York Idel Taflewicz received the English name Isadore Tofel. Later he changed it into Jennings Tofel, though the Jewish name Yehuda (= Yiddish Idel) was also used.

== Education ==
In New York the artistic talent of young Tofel was recognized, and he entered the Townsend Harris Hall Preparatory School. In 1917 he as Jennings Tofel was represented in a group exhibition at the Whitney Studio called "Introspective Art" (together with Claude Buck, Abraham Harriton, Benjamin Kopman).

His first one-man exhibition came in 1919 at the Bourgeoisie Galleries. That same year, and for the next several years, he was represented in several group exhibitions in the North East, with artists such as Oscar Bluemner, Gaston Lachaise, and Joseph Stella.

== Two artistic stays in Europe ==
In 1925, Tofel left for Europe to further his art studies in France, Italy and Germany, especially in Paris and Berlin. He returned in 1928 to New York. In 1929 Jennings Tofel received a new grant and made his second artistic journey in Europe. While visiting his native city of Tomaszów Mazowiecki, he met his relative, Sura Perla Wajsberg (later Pearl Tofel in U.S.A.), and after a few days of courtship quickly got married.

== Artistic life in New York ==
Jennings and Pearl Tofels returned to New York where they never had a permanent address. In 1931 he had a one-man exhibition at the SPR Gallery, New York and in 1932 the Whitney Museum of American Art purchased "Hagar". He was also represented in prestigious group exhibitions at the Jewish Museum in New York and the Butler Institute of American Art in Youngstown, Ohio.

In the last years of his life (1950–1959), Jennings Tofel exhibited at two-year intervals at the Artist's Gallery. His later years were a time of uninterrupted work. Adventures, confrontations and victories appeared in his art. His color became more fluid and contrasting than ever.

In 1959 after suffering for many years, his condition worsened and he died suddenly on 7 September 1959.

== Retrospective exhibitions and publications ==
A retrospective exhibition was held at the Zabriskie Gallery in New York in 1964, and Tofel's art was represented in the Art Dealers Association of America's 2nd Annual Show at the Park Bernet Galleries.

In 1976 Arthur Granick, a close personal friend and patron of Jennings Tofel, compiled a beautiful volume which contains 63 colorplates and 129 black-and-white illustrations, including Jennings Tofel's photographs.

== Sources ==
- M. Baigell, Jewish Art in America: An Introduction, Plymouth 2006, pp. XIX, XXIV, 30–32, 46, 79, 118, 122, 125–126, 128, 235, 239–240, 242, 244, 246, 249;
- Samantha Baskind, Encyclopedia of Jewish American Artists, Greenwood Press 2006, p. 281;
- Arthur Granick, Jennings Tofel, introduction by Alfred Werner, New York 1976, passim (phot.; illustrations);
- J. R. Hayes, Jennings Tofel: The Human Form, [in:] T. Fountain (ed.), Jennings Tofel, Mahwah, New Jersey 1984, pp. 8–30;
- Jerzy Malinowski, Malarstwo i rzeźba Żydów polskich w XIX i XX wieku [Painting and sculpture of the Polish Jews in the 19th and 20th century], Warszawa 2000, pp. 151, 164–5, 178;
- Krzysztof Tomasz Witczak, Słownik Biograficzny Żydów tomaszowskich The Biographical Dictionary of the Jews from Tomaszów Mazowiecki, Łódź – Tomaszów Mazowiecki 2010, ISBN 978-83-7525-358-0, pp. 245–247 (Jennings Tofel's biographical note; phot.).
- J. Zilczer, Artist and Patron: The formation of the Hirshhorn Museum's Willem de Kooning collection, "Journal of the History of Collections" 8(1), 1996, pp. 117–125.
