= Arthur Pickering =

England international rugby union player

- Full name: Arthur Stanley Pickering
- Born: 24 March 1885 Dewsbury, England
- Died: 17 February 1969 (aged 83) York, England
- Occupation: Wool merchant

Rugby union career
- Position: Centre
International career
Years	Team	Apps	(Points)
1907	England	1	(3)

Arthur Stanley Pickering (24 March 1885 – 17 February 1969) was an English international rugby union player.

== Biography ==
Pickering was born in Dewsbury and learned his rugby at Batley Grammar School.

A three-quarter, Pickering played for Harrogate and was an England reserve against the 1906–07 Springboks. His solitary cap came in place of centre John Birkett for England's 1907 Home Nations match in Dublin, where he contributed a penalty goal in a losing cause.

Pickering had a daughter who was married to the explorer Byron Khun de Prorok.

In 1969, Pickering died of pneumonia following surgery for a fractured femur.

== See also ==
- List of England national rugby union players
