= Claude Buck =

American artist (1890-1974)

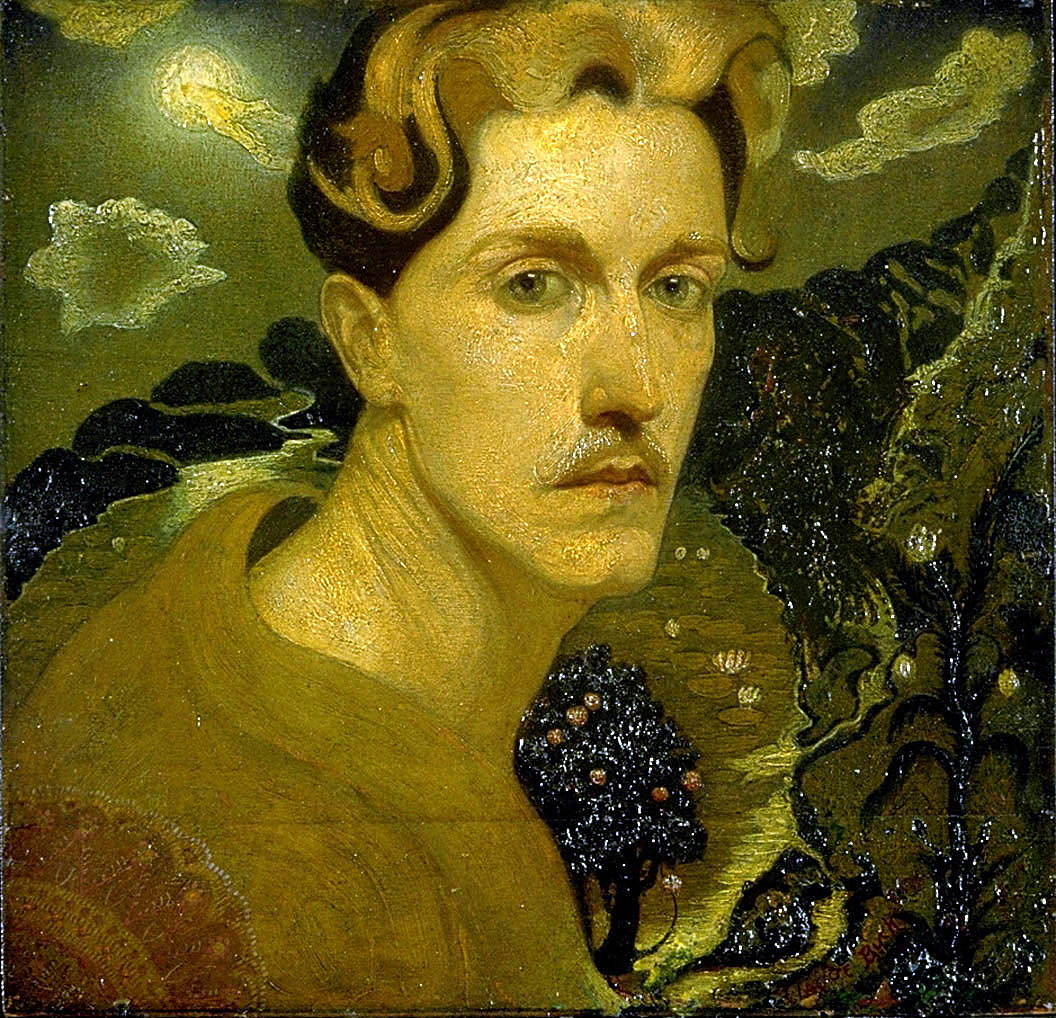
Self-Portrait 1919

Charles Claude Buck, known as Claude Buck (3 July 1890, New York City – 4 August 1974, Santa Barbara, California) was an American artist.

== Early life ==
Buck’s parents, William Robert Buck and Grace Buck (née Sargeant), were British immigrants who lived in poverty in the Bronx. His father was a commercial artist, who introduced his son to drawing at the age of four. He quickly showed exceptional talent and the age of eleven was given permission by the Metropolitan Museum of Art to copy classical Greek works in their collection.

At fourteen he became the youngest artist ever to study at the National Academy of Design, where he spent eight years creating work mainly inspired by romantic literature. There he studied still life with Emil Carlsen, figure drawing with Francis Coates Jones, and figure painting under George de Forest Brush. At 22 he completed his studies there, after winning eight prizes. He then studied in Munich and immediately began exhibiting his work on his return to the United States. To earn money, he also worked as a theatrical scene painter and for the Willet Stained Glass company, and in 1914 he began taking portrait commissions.

== Artistic career ==
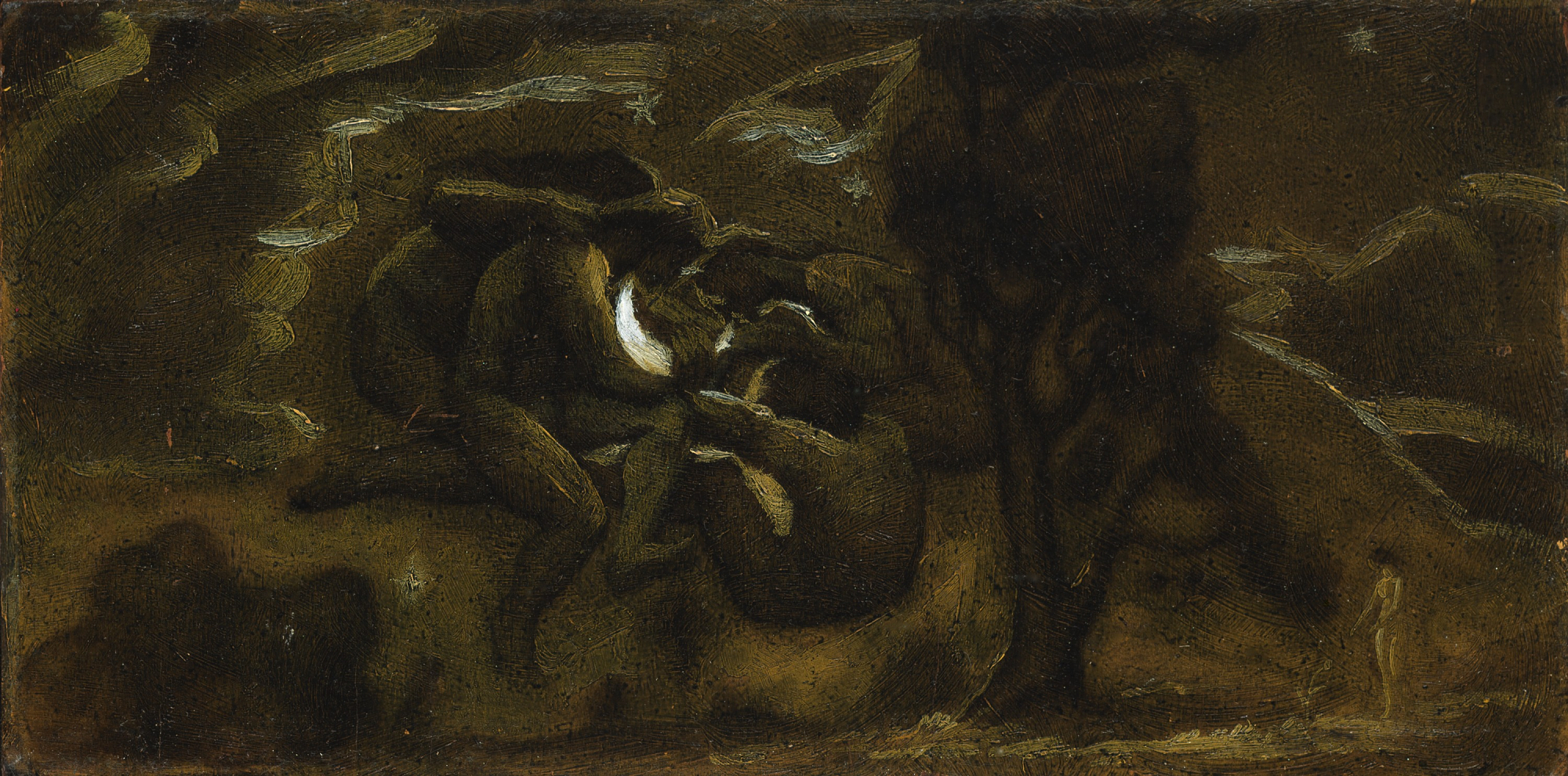
The Forces of Evil, 1914

In 1917, along with Benjamin Kopman, Abraham Harriton and Jennings Tofel, Buck was one of the co-founders of the Introspectives, a group who created surreal images and believed that “the poetry of a picture means more… than the imitation or even the representation of nature”. Their first exhibition was at the Whitney Studio Gallery in March 1917. There his work was noticed by the Chicago art dealer J.W. Young, who bought five of his paintings. After they sold quickly, Young invited Buck and his colleagues to mount their own show in Chicago in March 1918. Meanwhile the Introspectives had also exhibited their work at the Knoedler Galleries.

The interest in their work in the Midwest prompted several of these young New York artists to move to Chicago, as Buck did in 1919, along with Benjamin Kopman and Felix Russmann. In April 1920 Buck was given a solo exhibition at the W. Scott Thurber Gallery Despite this success, the brochure for a 1929 exhibition in Syracuse, New York, while acknowledging that Buck was “one of the most promising figures on the horizon of the American Artists’ World”, conceded that his paintings, “influenced by such writers as Edgar Allan Poe and William Blake… [were] ultra-mystic and not acceptable to the average picture buyer.”

During his time living in Chicago, Buck also had a studio in Midlothian, Illinois. He won the 1929 John C. Schaffer Prize for portraiture, and exhibited two paintings in the 34th annual Exhibition by Artists of Chicago and Vicinity in 1930.

Later in his career, he rejected the themes and styles of his earlier work and joined the Society for Sanity in Art, committed to straightforward, representational painting and dedicated “to help rid our museums of modernistic, moronic grotesqueries that were masquerading as art.” In 1932 he won the Mr and Mrs Frank G. Logan Art Institute Prize for his work Girl Reading, and an image of this painting later appeared on the cover of the Society for Sanity in Art’s first exhibition catalogue. He continued to reject modern art all his life, and accused some of his peers who worked in abstract styles of being communists.

Buck’s work can be found in the collections of any institutions across the United States, including the Santa Cruz Public Library, the Santa Cruz City Museum, the Spencer Museum of Art, the Brigham Young University Museum of Art, and the Museum of Elgin, Illinois Buck continued to exhibit and win prizes into the 1930s in Illinois, and into the 1950s in California.

== Personal life ==
Shortly before moving to Chicago, Buck married his first wife Estrid Terkelsen, a concert singer and pianist, whom he divorced in 1934. They had twins in 1921, a son Robert Byron Buck and a daughter, Juel Buck Krisvoy-Schiller. In 1930 Buck took on a young art student, Leslie Binner, whom he married in 1934 soon after divorcing his first wife.

In 1949, the couple moved to moved to a studio-home on Bean Creek, close to Scotts Valley, California, where they lived for ten years before settling in Santa Barbara in 1959 to be closer to Buck's children and to improve his health. While in Santa Barbara he was a member of the Carmel Art Association and the Santa Barbara Art Association, and served as president of the Santa Cruz Art League in 1953. Buck had asked that no news of his son’s death be shared with him, so when Robert died in 1971, Juel kept it a secret from him for the remainder of his life.
