= Alonzo W. Pond =

American archaeologist (1894–1986)

Alonzo William Pond
- Born: June 18, 1894; Janesville, Wisconsin, U.S.
- Died: December 25, 1986 (aged 92); Minocqua, Wisconsin, U.S.
- Education: Beloit College (B.S., 1920); University of Chicago (M.A., 1928)
- Occupations: Archaeologist, Speleogist
- Employer(s): Logan Museum of Anthropology, Mammoth Cave, Cave of the Mounds
- Spouse: Dorothy (Long) Pond

Alonzo W. Pond (1894–1986) was an American archaeologist and speleogist.

== Career ==
Born in Janesville, Wisconsin, he was assistant curator of the Logan Museum of Anthropology in Beloit, Wisconsin, starting in that position in 1924. Between 1925 and 1930 he conducted four excavations of prehistoric Paleolithic sites in northeastern Algeria, the first of which is described, along with his portrayals of extensive encounters with the Tuareg, in his narrative Veiled Men, Red Tents, and Black Mountains: The Lost Tomb of Queen Tin Hinan. His M.A. thesis, “A Contribution to the Study of Prehistoric Man in Algeria, North Africa,” was completed in 1928 in the Department of Anthropology at the University of Chicago, presenting results of his archæological digs of the Mechta-Afalou and published in the Logan Museum Bulletin (vol 1, no. 2) under the same title. Ten years later, the same bulletin published its fifth issue, Prehistoric Habitation Sites in the Sahara and North Africa in which Pond expands his studies on Algerian prehistory based on subsequent excavation findings in Algeria. In 1928, he joined one of the Central Asiatic Expeditions led by fellow Beloit College alumnus Roy Chapman Andrews in central Mongolia and, in addition to the north African collection in the 1920s, Pond significantly increased the Asian artifacts collection at the Logan Museum. He also published a scholarly study on making flint arrowheads after the manner of the pre-Columbian Indian entitled Primitive Methods of Working Stone, in which one reader points out Pond makes significant "the dependent relationship between lithic materials and controlling the design and shape of an implement."

The stock market crash ended further financial support, so the Algerian excavations ended. After 1931, Pond took various positions in the United States. He served as "an archaeologist and project supervisor for the National Park Service, the Civilian Conservation Corps, and Cave of the Mounds at Blue Mounds, Wisconsin." In 1933-34, he took a leading part in the Rainbow Bridge/Monument Valley Expedition in its initial phase. He led the CCC work at Devil's Lake for 3 1/2 years in the mid to late 1930s, building many of the trails, buildings, and benches still in use today. Pond's Illustrated Guidebook of the Newly Discovered Cave of the Mounds (1941) was the first speleological publication about the cave, written primarily for tourists. According to one reviewer, the Guide describes "what there is to see at the Cave, interspersed with valuable geological information." Between 1934 and 1936, along with John T. Zaharov, H. Summerfield Day, and W.J. Winter, Pond directed the Civilian Conservation Corps excavations of colonial Jamestown, as well as CCC Trail building at Interstate Park along the St. Croix River gorge in the northwestern part of Wisconsin. With his multiple excavation experiences in Algeria, Pond helped prepare future combat soldiers to contend with desert conditions, serving as the Chief of the Desert Branch of the Arctic, Desert, Tropic Information Center (ADTIC) at Alabama's Maxwell Air Force Base, with lecture notes published as a 51-page booklet in 1951, and subsequently extended for a thorough, book-length treatment, co-authored by Paul H. Nesbitt and William H. Allen.

He delivered lectures illustrated with lantern slides and films on such topics as "With Andrews in the Gobi", "Nomads of Algeria", "Lost John of Mummy Ledge" concerning a pre-Columbian miner stuck after a boulder moved onto him (and Pond extracted and preserved his remains), and Mammoth Cave. Over a thousand of his photographic slides have been archived in the Gottesman Research Library at the American Museum of Natural History in New York, while over thirty film reels, discovered in 1980 by Michael Tarabulski in the Logan Museum, are permanently stored in the Human Studies Film Archives of the Smithsonian Institution in Washington, D.C. He supported numerous younger scholars, for example supplying all the data he had gathered for research that Georg Neumann undertook on two mummies discovered in Mammouth Cave, the first of which Pond preserved, named "Lost John" and "Fawn Hoof," or in the final expedition he directed in eastern Algeria when, in February 1930, Pond led a group of eleven college students to assist him in excavating the sites. He wrote a pictorial guide on natural and man-made landscape features entitled Wisconsin Nooks and Corners (1947), with all photographs taken by himself. A highly regarded spelunker, Pond was a member of the Explorers Club and the Adventurer's Club of Chicago. In 1970, he was awarded the "Distinguished Service Citation" from his alma mater Beloit College.

== Personal life ==
Born to William Samuel Pond and Maria Olson Pond in 1894, Alonzo grew up in Jamesville with his younger brother Edwin. William Pond was co-owner of Pond & Bailey Dry Goods, a business he inherited from his father, Samuel S. Pond, and the Ponds were well-established economically and socially in Janesville. At the age of twenty-eight, Alonzo married Dorothy Long (1900–1987) on July 20, 1926, five weeks after their first meeting, who immediately joined Alonzo on an Algerian expedition. Dorothy Pond later became the posthumous author of If Women Have Courage... Among Shepherds, Sheiks, and Scientists in Algeria (2014). Their daughter Chomingwen (1927–2019) was ordained in the United Church of Christ ministry in Wisconsin after graduating from Beloit College in 1950 with a major in geology; she then became a missionary with the General Board of Global Ministries in Africa (in Sierra Leone and Zimbabwe) and earned a Ph.D. from Claremont Graduate University; their son Arthur (1932–2012) served in the Coast Guard and then was employed by the US Forest Service; both were born in Madison, Wisconsin. In retirement, Alonzo and Dorothy resided in Minocqua in northern Wisconsin until their deaths, and their daughter Chomingwen subsequently retired there as well.

== Selected bibliography ==
Pond published many scholarly articles, books, and book reviews, including:

- "American Expedition Penetrates Sahara in Quest of Ancient Man." The Science News-Letter 7:233 (May, 1925): 4.
- "Did Stone Age Warriors Play "African Golf"? The Science News-Letter 7:236 (Oct., 1925): 6. <https://www.jstor.org/stable/44781924>
- "Review of Un Atelier d'Art Prehistorique Limeuil (Dordogne) by Dr. C. Capitan and Jean Bouyssonie." In: American Anthropologist 28:2 (Apr., 1926): 421-424. ISSN 0002-7294 <https://www.jstor.org/stable/661560>
- "Review of Algeria from Within by R. V. C. Bodley." In: American Journal of Sociology 33:5 (Mar., 1928): 844-845. <https://www.jstor.org/stable/2765855>
- A Contribution to the Study of Prehistoric Man in Algeria, North Africa. Beloit: Logan Museum Bulletin 1, 1928.
  - review by H. F. C. Ten Kate, "Review of A Contribution to the Study of Prehistoric Man in Algeria, North Africa by Alonzo W. Pond." In: American Anthropologist 33:3 (July-Sept., 1931): 438-440. ISSN 0002-7294
- "Gara Cheurfa," The Scientific Monthly 26:6 (June, 1928): 561-567. ISSN 0096-3771 <https://www.jstor.org/stable/8115>
- Primitive Methods of Working Stone. Based on Experiments of Halvor L. Skavlem. Beloit: Logan Museum Bulletin 2, 1930. <https://ia803200.us.archive.org/12/items/primitivemethods00pond/primitivemethods00pond.pdf>
- "Suggestions on Technique in Archaeology," Wisconsin Archaeologist 10:2 (January 1, 1931): 45-53. ISSN 0043-6364
- "Review of Les Xylographies du XIVe et du XVe Siècle au Cabinet des Estampes de la Bibliotheque Nationale. Tome Second by Paul-André Lemoisne and Henry Bartlett van Hoesen." In: American Journal of Archaeology 35:4 (Oct., 1931): 496. ISSN 0002-9114
- Petrology of Stone Artifacts from Mongolia. (Co-authored with Nels C. Nelson and Leslie Erskine Spock). New York: Bulletin of the AMNH, 1934. ISSN 0003-0090
- "Report on Preliminary Survey of Important Archaeological Discovery at Mammoth Cave". Wisconsin Archeologist 15:2 (1935): 27-35. ISSN 0043-6364
- "Wisconsin joins ranks of oldest inhabited areas in America". Wisconsin Archeologist 17:3 (1937): 51-54. ISSN 0043-6364
- Prehistoric Habitation Sites in the Sahara and North Africa. Beloit: Logan Museum Bulletin 5, 1938.
- Illustrated Guidebook of the Newly Discovered Cave of the Mounds. Milton, WI: Frantz Printing Co, 1941.
  - review by Lillian Krueger, "Review of Guide Book of Cave of the Mounds by Alonzo Pond." In: Wisconsin Magazine of History 25:2 (1941): 240. ISSN 1943-7366
- "Calcite oolites or 'cave pearls' found in the Cave of the Mounds," Journal of Sedimentary Research 15:2 (1 August 1945): 55–58. ISSN 1527-1404 <https://doi.org/10.1306/D426921F-2B26-11D7-8648000102C1865D>
- Afoot in the Desert: A Contribution to Basic Survival. Boulder: Paladin Press, 1951. ISBN 1-4101-0889-9 (Reprinted by Fredonia Books, 2006 - ISBN 1-4101-0889-9).
- "Saudi Arabia in Transition." Air University Quarterly Review 5:3 (Fall 1952): 113-116. ISSN 2692-4307 <https://www.airuniversity.af.edu/Portals/10/ASPJ/journals/1952_Vol05_No1-4/1952_Vol5_No3.pdf>
- The Desert World. New York and Edinburgh: Thomas Nelson & Sons, 1962. ISBN 1-1147-2716-4
  - review by M. J. Chadwick, "Review of The Desert World by Alonzo W. Pond." In: The Quarterly Review of Biology 38:3 (Sept., 1963): 255. <https://www.jstor.org/stable/2820141>
  - review by M. J. Wus, "Review of The Desert World by Alonzo W. Pond." In: Geography 49:2 (April 1964): 150.
- Caverns of the World. New York: W. W. Norton, 1965. ISBN 1-1256-6907-1
- Deserts: Silent Lands of the World. New York: Norton, 1965. ISBN 0-4482-5941-9
- Survival in Sun and Sand. New York: W. W. Norton, 1969. <https://archive.org/details/survivalinsunsan0000pond>
- Andrews: Gobi Explorer. New York: Grosset & Dunlap, 1972. ISBN 0-4482-6209-6
- Pilot's Survival Manual (co-authored with Paul H Nesbitt and William H. Allen). New York: Wiley, 1979. ISBN 0-4422-5994-8
- Veiled Men, Red Tents, and Black Mountains: The Lost Tomb of Queen Tin Hinan, Michael A. Tarabulski (ed.). Santa Barbara: Narrative Press, 2003. ISBN 1-5897-6206-1

== Photos ==
- "Alonzo Pond Riding Ole Olson" (1925) in Aïn Salah, (central) Algeria—in the Alonzo W. and Dorothy L. Pond papers collected at the Wisconsin Historical Society <https://wisconsinhistory.org/Records/Image/IM135307>
- "The Logan Museum team" (1930) from the African Archaeological Review <https://www.researchgate.net/figure/The-Logan-Museum-team-at-Camp-Logan-6th-from-the-left-Alonzo-Pond-at-his-left-Dorothy_fig2_369758747>
- "Steps Taken to Preserve the Body in Cave." Associated Press Photo (undated, but in the early to mid 1930s) in Mammoth Cave. In: "The Mummies of Mammoth Cave" by Dan Wagner. (Pond photo is in the section titled Lost John Mummy) <https://www.greatamericanhikes.com/post/the-mummies-of-mammoth-cave>
- "Pond, Alonzo W." (1930s) Alonzo William Pond, 1894-1986 (left) with Frank G. Logan, 1851-1937 (right) at Beloit College. University of Chicago Library, Special Collections Research Center. <https://storage.lib.uchicago.edu/ucpa/series1/derivatives_series1/apf1-06866r.jpg>

== Documentary films ==
- Algerian History Channel (Alonzo Pond, American Explorer to Algeria on YouTube)
- Reliving the Past: Alonzo Pond and the 1930 Logan African Expedition, Michael Tarabulski (dir.). Centre Prod., Inc., Boulder, 1986 (part of videotape on YouTube) (Reliving The Past on YouTube)
