= Tin Hinan Tomb =

Tomb in Tamanrasset, Algeria

Coordinates: 22.885533°N 4.868080°E

Tin Hinan Tomb Tombeau de Tin Hinan
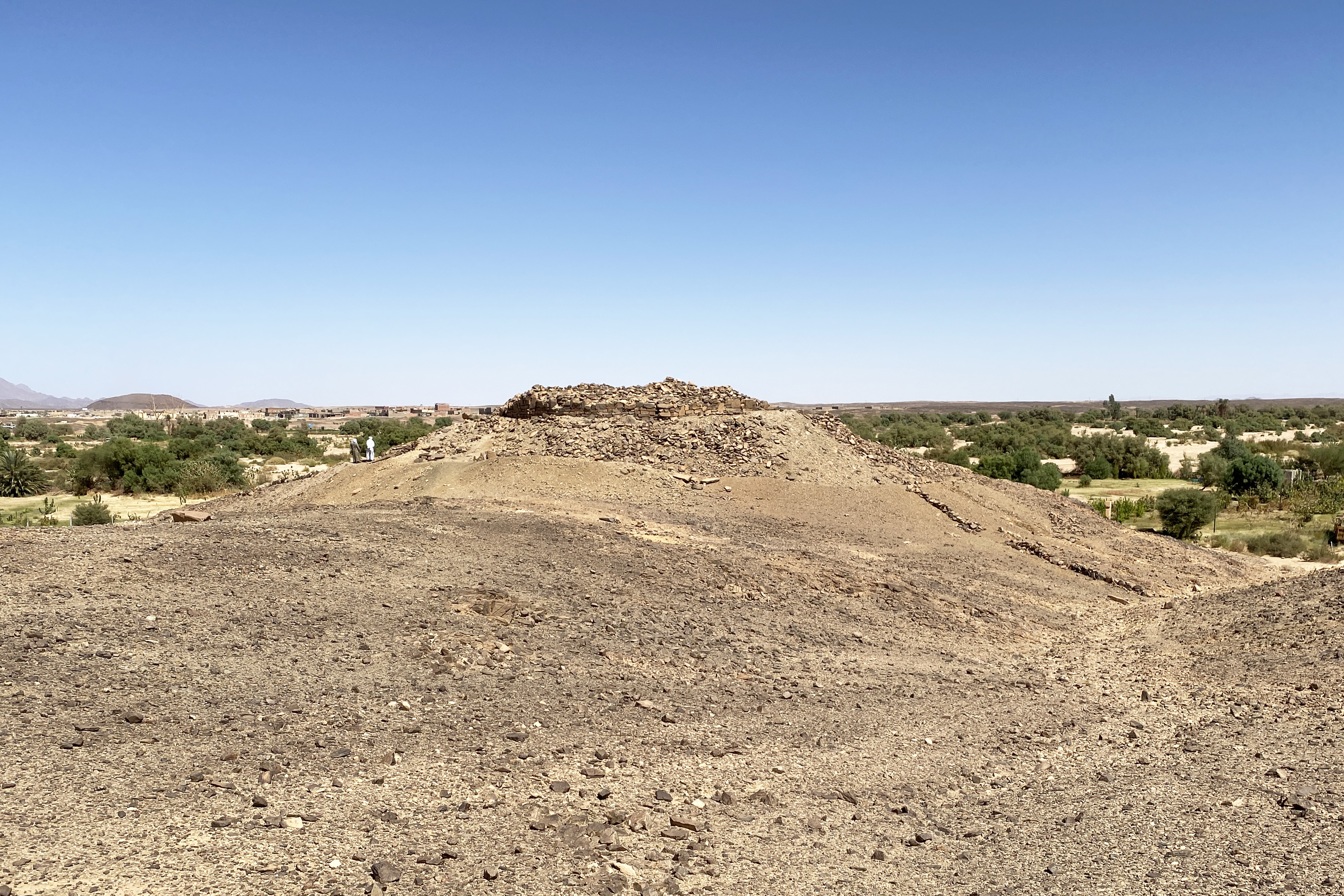
- Tomb of Tin Hinan near Abalessa.
- Interactive map of Tin Hinan Tomb; Tombeau de Tin Hinan
- Location: Abalessa, Algeria
- Type: monumental tomb
- Beginning date: c. 4th-5th century AD
- Completion date: 1,500 years ago
- Dedicated to: Queen Tin Hinan

The Tin Hinan Tomb (French: Tombeau de Tin Hinan, Arabic: ضريح الملكة تينهنان, lit. 'Mausoleum of Queen Tinhanan') is a monumental tomb located at Abalessa in the Sahara, in the Hoggar Mountains of southern Algeria. The sepulchre was built for Tin Hinan, the Tuareg ancient Queen of the Hoggar (Ahaggar).

== History ==
=== Origin ===
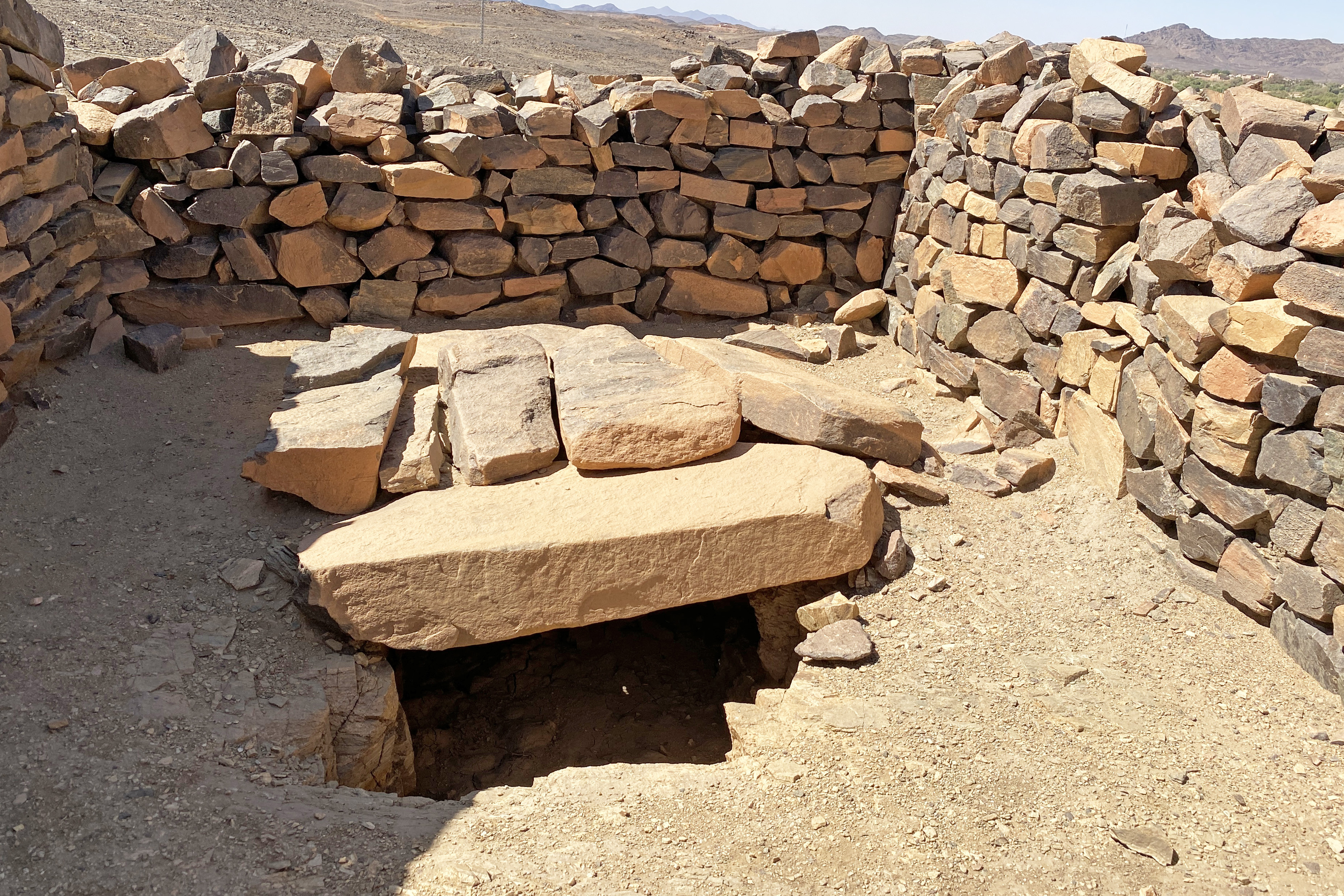
The tomb near Abalessa.

Tin Hinan is the name given by the Tuareg to a 3rd- or 4th-century woman of prestige whose skeleton was found in a pre-Islamic tomb in the Ahaggar Mountains. Tin Hinan is sometimes referred to as "Queen of the Hoggar", and by the Tuareg as Tamenokalt which also means "queen". The name literally means "woman of the tents", but is sometimes translated as "Queen of the camp" (with the "camp" possibly referring to the group of tombs which surround hers) or more metaphorically as "Mother of us all".

The French explorer Henri Lhote argued that the Tin Hinan sepulcher is different from the surrounding tombs in southern Algeria, and is more typical of the architecture used by the Roman legionaries to create their fortifications in desert areas. He believed that the tomb was therefore likely built on top of an earlier Roman castrum, which was originally erected around 19 BC, when consul Lucius Cornelius Balbus conquered the Garamantian territories and sent a small expeditionary force to reach the Niger River. This hypothesis was discussed earnestly by James Wellard, but it is rejected by most scholars today.

=== Excavation ===
The tomb was opened by Byron Khun de Prorok with support from the French army in 1925, and other archaeologists made a more thorough investigation in 1933. It was found to contain the skeleton of a woman on a wooden litter, lying on her back with her head facing east. She was accompanied by heavy gold and silver jewellery, some of it adorned with pearls. On her right forearm, she wore 7 silver bracelets, and on her left, 7 gold bracelets. Another silver bracelet and a gold ring were placed with the body. Remains of a complex piecework necklace of gold and pearls (real and artificial) were also present. Furthermore, a number of funerary objects were also found. These included a "Venus" statue (similar in style to the Venus of Hohle Fels with exaggerated sexual organs), a glass goblet (lost during World War II), and gold foil which bore the imprint of a Roman coin of emperor Constantine I issued between 308 and 324 AD. The expedition removed all the bones and treasures and took them back to the Ethnographical Museum in Algiers, where they remain on display. A fourth century date is consistent with radiocarbon dating of the wooden bed, as well as with the style of pottery and other tomb furniture. The monument itself is constructed in an architectural style that was widespread in the Berber Sahara during classical times.

In the 1960s, the anthropologist E. Leblanc examined the skeleton within the Tin Hinan tomb. He observed that the remains were tall and lithe, with a narrow pelvis, broad shoulders and slender legs. Overall, the skeleton closely resembled those found in the pharaonic monuments of ancient Egypt. The body found in the tomb is now in the Bardo Museum in Algiers.

== Bibliography ==
- Beltrami, Vanni. Il monumento di Abalessa e la tradizione dei Tuareg Kel Hoggar, "Africa" (Ist. Italo Africano). Roma, 1995 (p. 75-93)
- Gautier, Émile Félix. Le monument de Tin Hinan (Annales de l'Académie des sciences coloniales) t VII. Paris, 1934.
- Pandolfi, Paul. Les Touaregs de l'Ahaggar: Parenté et résidence chez les Dag-Ghâli. Ed. Karthala. Paris, 1998 ISBN 2-86537-821-7.
- Pond, Alonzo W. Veiled Men, Red Tents, and Black Mountains: The Lost Tomb of Queen Tin Hinan, Michael A. Tarabulski (ed.). London: Narrative Press, 2003. ISBN 1-58976-206-1.
- Reygasse, Maurice. Monuments funéraires préislamiques de l'Afrique du Nord. Gouvernement Général de l'Algérie, Arts et Métiers Graphiques. Paris, 1950

== See also ==
- Romans in Sub-Saharan Africa
- Lucius Cornelius Balbus
