= George Kokines =

American painter

George Kokines (November 17, 1930 – November 26, 2012) was an American painter, active in Chicago and New York City from the early 1960s until his death in 2012.

== Life ==
Kokines was an alumnus of the School of the Art Institute of Chicago.

In 1966, he relocated to Greenwich Village, Manhattan. He maintained a studio in SoHo through the 1970s and worked at two Soho artist bars, the Broome Street Bar and Fanelli's. Later studios were located in Long Island City (in Queens) and lower Manhattan, where he witnessed firsthand the collapse of the World Trade Center on September 11, 2001. This event affected his life and his work for the remaining years of his life.

Kokines died of leukemia at his home in the Rogers Park neighborhood of Chicago, on November 26, 2012.

== Work ==
His large and colorful abstract expressionist oil paintings earned notice in the early 1960s, especially in Chicago. In 1962, he won the Art Institute of Chicago Mr and Mrs Frank G. Logan Art Institute Prize at the annual Chicago and Vicinity annual exhibition. Although described as an abstract expressionist, Kokines told an interviewer "All contemporary painting should defy description." Kokines's paintings from this period were noted for their "fierce movement and polyphonic complexity" and "organic surrealist overtones." His paintings and drawings were featured in several group and solo shows in Chicago galleries,. and was included in the Whitney Museum Annual Contemporary Painting show in 1963.

There was a local censorship scandal in Chicago when the Chicago Public Library Cultural Center removed his paintings from display after a library visitor complained that they were obscene. Others defended the paintings, which were purchased by Hugh Hefner.

In the 1980 and 90s, Kokines used textured surfaces out of cement and plaster onto which he painted or scratched images and writing. "Painting is the way of creating a visual writing that stimulates an inner knowing before it can be put into words." In the late 1990s, Kokines produced a series of paintings called Etudes, featuring organic plant-like forms in containers painted on top of black and white lithographs of a piano.

Among Kokines's final works is a group of panels based on the events of September 11, 2001, which he witnessed firsthand. The series was shown together in 2011 in Elgin, Illinois. About these paintings, he said, "I wanted a memorial, not an autopsy. I didn’t want to be in the disaster business."
