= William Evan Charles Morgan =

British artist

- Born: 19 October 1903; Greenwich, London
- Died: 1989 (aged 85–86); Switzerland
- Education: St Dunstan's College, Camberwell School of Art, Slade School of Fine Art, British School at Rome
- Occupation(s): Artist and engraver
- Spouse: Phyllis Annette Morgan (m. 1928)
- Children: 2

William Evan Charles Morgan (19 October 1903 – 1979) was an artist, etcher and engraver on both wood and metal. He signed his work William E.C. Morgan.

== Early life ==
Morgan was born in London on 19 October 1903, the only son of William Henry Morgan, the headmaster of a school in Bermondsey, and his wife, Emily. The family was originally from Cornwall.

== Studies ==
Morgan went to school at St Dunstan's College in Catford, London. He studied art first at the Camberwell School of Art under Albert Rutherston and then moved to the Slade School of Fine Art to study with Henry Tonks. In 1923 Tonks proposed that Morgan should submit some of his wood engravings for a Prix de Rome scholarship in engraving to the British School at Rome, which he was awarded in July 1924. Morgan spent some four years in Italy where he focussed on line engraving directly onto the plate and produced several of his best prints of landscapes around Saracinesco and Orvieto. Morgan returned to the U.K. in 1928 to live in Cornwall.

== Work ==
During his years as an active engraver Morgan designed 13 wood engravings, 25 line engravings, four drypoints, four etchings (two with line engraving), and four bookplates, most of which are in the collection of Georgetown University. Four of Morgan's prints of allegorical subjects, which showed the influence on his work of early engravers such as Albrecht Dürer, were reproduced between 1928 and 1931 in Fine Prints of the Year. His prints were published by the Beaux Arts Gallery.

In 1927 Morgan sent three etchings to the Chicago Society of Etchers to be considered for a forthcoming exhibition. In 1928 Morgan was awarded the Art Institute of Chicago’s Logan Medal of the Arts for his prints. His medal, dated 1928, is now in the Special Collections of Georgetown University in Washington, D.C.

The Great Depression in the early 1930s led to the end of the etching revival which meant that Morgan could no longer make a living from his prints, so he moved to the estate of a patron in Argyll in western Scotland, where he taught and painted. In 1935 he started engraving again, including an etching of Kinlochaline Castle, but his eyesight deteriorated and he was forced to give up etching and engraving and took up a teaching position at the Harrow School of Art in 1939.

During World War II, Morgan served as a camouflage officer. After the war he worked for the British Rural Industries Bureau, which had been established in 1921 to support rural crafts and small industries. He retired in 1968.

== Personal life ==
Morgan married Phyllis Annette Scarborough (b 31 August 1907) in 1928. They are believed to have had two children. After he retired he moved to Switzerland to be near his daughter, where he died in 1979.
