= J. Theodore Johnson =

American painter

J. Theodore Johnson (November 7, 1902 – 1963) was an American artist and muralist. He was born in Oregon, Illinois, in 1902 and studied at the Art Institute of Chicago from 1921 to 1925. He became an artist and instructor in life drawing at the institute from 1928 to 1929. He also taught at the Minneapolis School of Art and the San José College in California. He died in Sunnyvale, California, in 1963.

== Works and awards ==
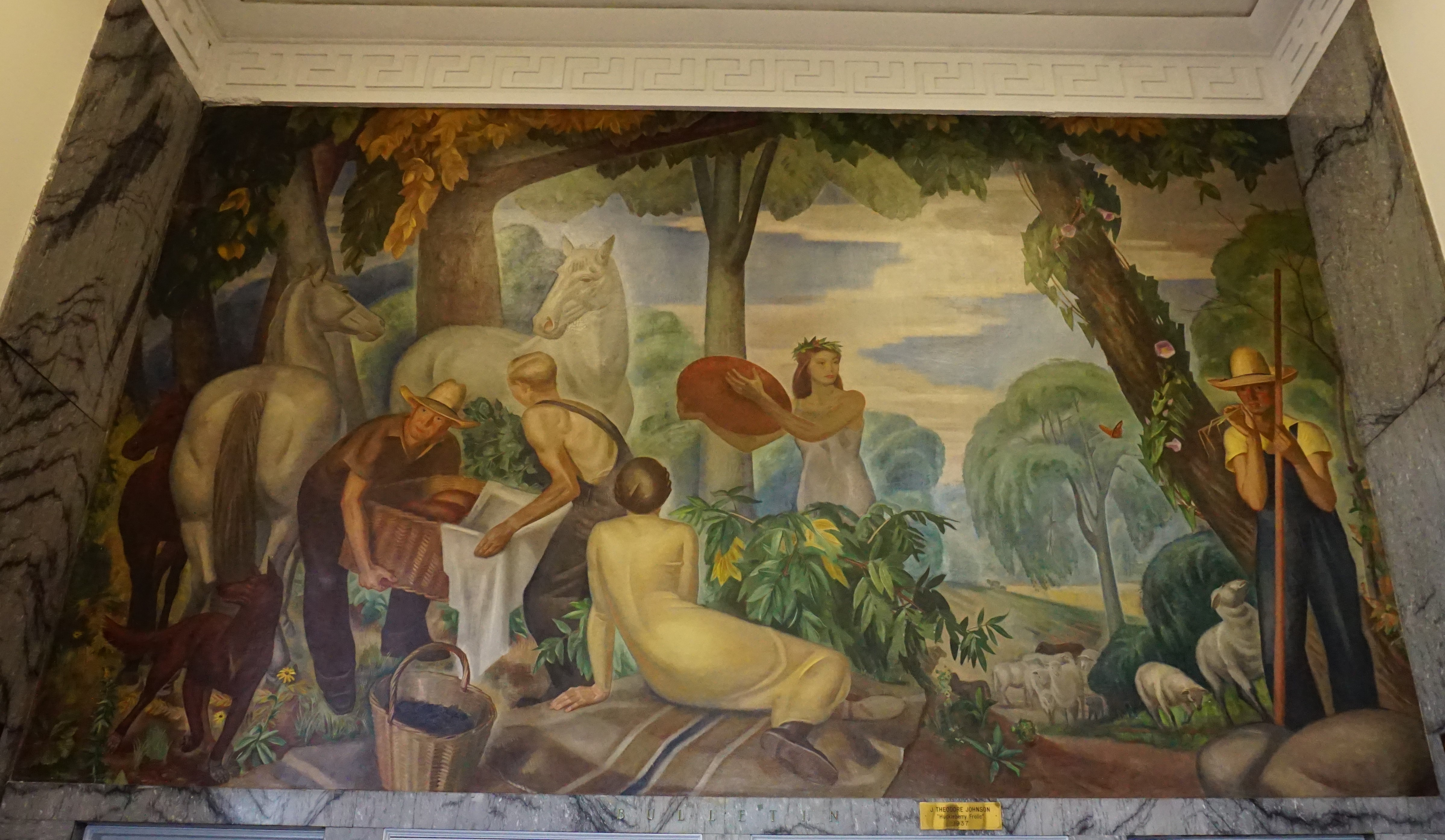
Huckleberry Frolic (1937), Johnson's mural at the United States Post Office in Garden City, New York

- Mary, a portrait, was awarded a Mr. and Mrs. Frank G. Logan Prize at the 1928 Chicago and Vicinity annual exhibition of the Art Institute of Chicago, and is now in their permanent collection.
- Suzanne, a nude, was awarded the Joseph N. Eisendrath Prize by the Art Institute of Chicago in 1928.
- Portrait of Professor Harry A. Bigelow is in the University of Chicago Law Library
- Portrait of Professor Henry J. Cox is in the office of the Geographic Society of Chicago in the Field Museum of Natural History
- The Black Mantilla was awarded the Mr. and Mrs. Frank G. Logan Medal of $2,500 at the Annual Exhibition of American Painting and Sculpture in 1928 at the Art Institute of Chicago.
- In 1939 Johnson completed four oil on canvas murals in the Oak Park, Illinois post office for the United States Treasury Department's Section of Painting and Sculpture: The Founding of Fort Crevecoeur, La Salle's Search for Tonti, 1680, The Pioneer of 1848, and The Osceola – The First Shipment of Wheat from Chicago, 1839.
- Annual American Exhibitions in Chicago, Philadelphia, Detroit, St. Louis, Buffalo, Washington, and Rochester.
- The Eighth International Water Color Exhibition, 1928, Art Institute of Chicago.
- One-man shows in 1928 of oils and watercolors at the Arts Club of Chicago, the Art Institute of Chicago, and shows in Davenport, Cedar Rapids, and Des Moines, Iowa.
