= Margo Hoff =

American painter (1910–2008)

- Born: 14 June 1910; Tulsa, Oklahoma, US
- Died: 17 August 2008 (aged 98)
- Education: National Academy of Art (Chicago), the Art Institute of Chicago, the University of Chicago
- Known for: Modernist art

Margo Hoff (14 June 1910 – 17 August 2008) was an American painter.

== Early life and education ==
Margo Hoff was born in 1910 in Carthage, Missouri, and grew up in Tulsa, Oklahoma. She was the second oldest of eight children. Her parents were carpenter Clarence W. Hoff and Ada A. Hayes. In 1923, she fell ill with typhoid fever and was bedridden for the summer. She spent this time drawing and making paper cutouts.

Educated at Tulsa Central High School and Tulsa University (1930–31). She studied art at the National Academy of Art in Chicago (1934–35), the Art Institute of Chicago (1936–37), the University of Chicago (Audit Class in Art History) (1941–44) and Hull House.

== Career ==
During the 1950s she exhibited paintings and prints in shows around the US and in 1955 held an individual show at the Wildenstein Galleries in Paris. In 1960 she moved to live in New York City, where her work was frequently shown in Hadler-Rodriguez Galleries, Saidenberg Gallery, Babcock Gallery, Betty Parsons Gallery, and Banter Gallery. After the move to New York, her work became more brightly colored and less earth-toned.

Her Chicago paintings were typical of mid-century modern urbanism. In New York she moved on to work in collage, initially with paper and later with canvas, for which she became primarily known.

== Personal life ==
Margo Hoff's figurative approach was deeply inspired by her frequent trips to Mexico in the 1940s, where she witnessed the works of 1930s Mexican painters. Married to George Buehr.

She died in her Manhattan loft, which served as her painting studio and home, at the age of 98. Her ashes were placed in Graceland Cemetery, Chicago.

== Collections ==
- Disco (1981) and Vermilion Banner Metropolitan Museum of Art
- Murder Mystery (1945), Picasso's Bather (1974), City Beyond the Tree (c.1953) and Doorways, Art Institute of Chicago
- Smithsonian American Art Museum

== Honors and awards ==
- 1944 Mr and Mrs Frank G. Logan Art Institute Prize
- 1945 Armstrong Award - Exhibition by Artists of Chicago and Vicinity
- 1946 Campana Memorial Purchase Award
- 1950 Brower Prize
- 1953 Logan Medal and First Prize
- 1961 First Prize, 2nd Annual Chicago Artists Competition
- 1969 Awarded honorary degree of Doctor of Fine Arts by Saint Mary's College
- 1967 Winner of Illinois Bell Telephone Competition to design Chicago Directory cover
- 1987 Awarded honorary degree Doctor of Humane Letters, Drew University
