= Margaret Fitzhugh Browne =

American artist

- Self Portrait
- Born: June 7, 1884; West Roxbury, Massachusetts, US
- Died: July 11, 1972 (aged 88); Boston, Massachusetts, US
- Known for: Painting

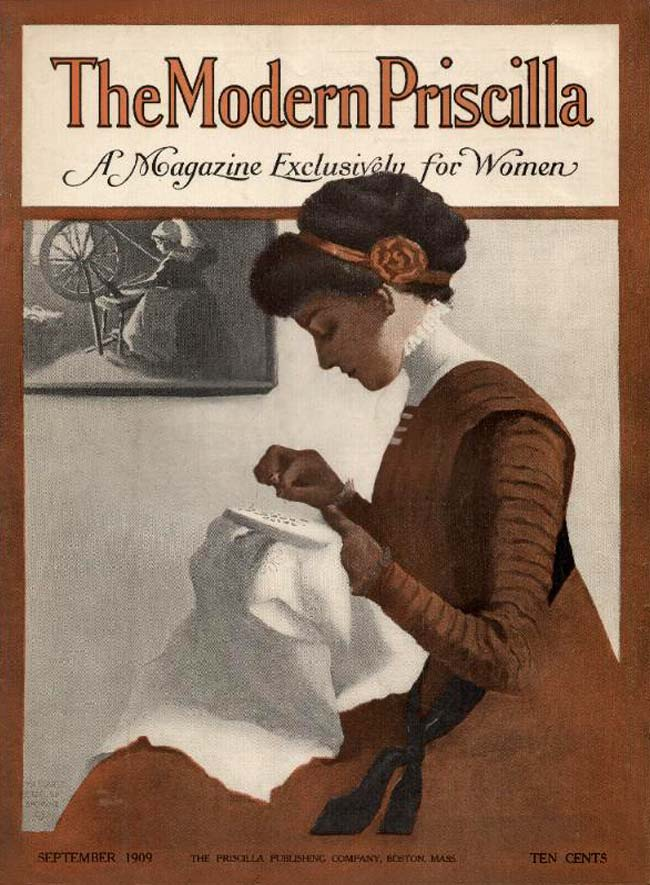
Cover illustration by Browne for The Modern Priscilla: A Magazine Exclusively for Women, September 1909. This work epitomizes Browne's "Old Maid", Victorian values

Margaret Fitzhugh Browne (June 7, 1884 – January 11, 1972) was an American painter of portraits, indoor genre scenes, and still lifes.

== Family ==
Browne was the second child of Cordelia Brooks Browne and James Maynadier Browne. She had three sisters (Katherine, Brooks, and Emily) and one brother (Causten). Her older sister, Katherine, illustrated children’s verse written by her mother’s second husband, David K. Stevens.

== Education ==
Browne graduated from the Boston Latin School in 1903. She then studied at the Massachusetts Normal School from 1904 to 1909, where she studied with Joseph DeCamp, landscape artist Richard Andrew, and color theorist Albert H. Munsell. She attended the Boston Museum School in 1909 and 1910, receiving instruction from Edmund Tarbell and Frank Benson.

== Career ==
Browne’s career spanned all aspects of the art world. She had a studio in the Fens and one in Annisquam, an attractive part of Gloucester, Massachusetts, where she also taught classes. She began her career as a portrait painter in 1910, was the art editor of the Boston Evening Transcript from 1919–20, and authored a book, Portrait Painting, in 1933. In the book, she advised portraitists to work quickly to capture their sitter’s features and not exhaust them. She was a firm adherent of realism in art, and was quoted referring to the Museum of Fine Arts, Boston's 1940 Picasso exhibit as "an exhibition of crazy stuff." She also founded the Boston branch of the Society for Sanity in Art and served on the Advisory Board of Josephine Logan's Chicago branch, an organization promoting the retention of traditional values and styles in art.

From early 1944 through May 1945, Browne served the USO as a portrait sketcher, volunteering three times a week, as her diaries, now archived at the Boston Public Library, indicate. Photographs of over 120 of these charcoal portraits of servicemen and women were made and presented to her. Many of the photographs carry the names of the servicemen and women, and a few wrote a heartfelt note to her on the back. Similar wartime efforts have been documented and help elucidate the support that Browne and others gave to the war efforts.

Among the subjects of her portraits are the Wood family, including Henry A. Wise Wood, his wife, and their children and grandson; Senator William Borah; Arthur D. Little, whose portrait hung for years in the lobby of his eponymous firm; her brother-in-law, noted author James Brown; Miss Eleanor Satterlee, granddaughter of John Pierpont Morgan, Sr.; King Alfonso XIII of Spain, whose portrait is in the New York Yacht Club; Ray Curley, the boxer; Charles Kellogg Burdick, Dean of the Cornell Law School, 1926–36, whose portrait now hangs in the Reading Room of the School; Dr. Frederick Taylor Lord and Dr. Reginald Heber Fitz, whose portraits are now in the Massachusetts General Hospital; Helen Osborn Storrow, whose portrait hangs in the Museum of the Girl Scouts in Cedar Hill, Waltham, MA; numerous self-portraits; portraits of family members; and Bobby Jones, commissioned by the City of Atlanta. One of her most powerful paintings, referenced in American Women Artists, 1830–1930, is “Wounded in the War” or “Blessé de Guerre.” Here, the “hot red backdrop creates a dynamic foil to the sensitivity expressed in the foreground figures,” a man blinded in World War I and his dog, which he holds on his lap.

Browne excelled in figure painting, with subjects such as "The Chess Player," "The Art Students," “Bridge,” “Little Leaguers,” and portraits of ballet dancers. A Studio of Her Own describes how Browne injected a great deal of feeling into a simple design, demonstrating a flair for the human and pictorial qualities of her portraits. She was known to reduce her portrait subjects to the simplest planes, attempting to attain a degree of force without crudeness, as in "The Old Farmer's Almanac." In this picture, a country man in shirt sleeves reads by a lamp in the comfort of a kitchen. Her model for the work was a farmer who lived near her summer studio in Annisquam. Nine of her portraits are in the Annisquam Village Hall. As Raymond Agler, Fine Arts Dealer, writes on his web page:

Browne's love of the staged scene found perfect expression in her annual "Wax Works," the tableau vivants that she produced every summer for 25 years at the Annisquam Sea Fair (which continues to the present, and was the subject of an article in the "New Yorker"). She had an uncanny talent for identifying facial similarities of the famous or infamous in the looks and manners of her neighbors—who were then recruited to pose as wax figures, the subjects ranging from Marat (with a gob of ketchup on his chest) in his bathtub to Little Miss Muffet.

In 1927, Browne won a commission to go to Europe to paint the King of Spain for the New York Yacht Club. A yachtswoman herself, Browne enjoyed the experience immensely, and the painting of Alfonso XIII is considered one of her finest works. Shortly after the King’s death in 1941, Browne wrote an extensive article about meeting the King and painting his portrait. It was published in the March 2, 1941 edition of the Boston Sunday Globe, and in it she described the King as lively, humorous, agreeable, and a capital story teller.

Browne was a member of most professional artist groups of her time, including the Guild of Boston Artists, Copley Society of Art, Rockport Art Association, Grand Central Art Galleries in New York, and at least a dozen others. Her works were included in most of these organizations' exhibitions and at the Pennsylvania Academy of the Fine Arts and the Art Institute of Chicago. She was the recipient of many awards, including the popular prize, North Shore Arts Association, Long Island, New York, and founder's special award, Society for Sanity in Art, Chicago, Illinois. Solo exhibitions of her work were held in Boston in 1915, 1917, 1926, 1938, and 1957; in Duxbury, CT in 1916, in New York City in 1924, in Washington, DC in 1930, at the Boston Art Club in 1936, and at the Newport Art Association in 1950. Her work was also part of the painting event in the art competition at the 1932 Summer Olympics.

Two years after her death at age 87, the Copley Society held the "Memorial Exhibition of Flower Compositions and a Few Portraits by Margaret Fitzhugh Browne." The Copley Society awards the Margaret Fitzhugh Brown Memorial Award for Excellence in Portraiture.

== Sources ==
Erica Hirshler, A Studio of Her Own, Women Artists in Boston, 1870–1940, 2001; American Women Artists, 1830–1930, The National Museum of Women in the Arts, 1987; and personal papers in the Archives of American Art, Smithsonian Institution, Washington and The Boston Public Library.
