= Theodore Roszak (artist) =

Polish-American sculptor and painter

- Invocation I, steel of 1947, at the Hirshhorn Museum and Sculpture Garden
- Born: 1 May 1907; Posen, Prussia (now Poznań, Poland)
- Died: 2 September 1981 (aged 74); New York City, United States
- Education: School of the Art Institute of Chicago; National Academy of Design; Columbia University
- Known for: Painting, Sculpture

Theodore Roszak (May 1, 1907 – September 2, 1981) was a Polish-American sculptor and painter. He was born in Posen, Prussia (German Empire), now Poznań, Poland, as a son of Polish parents, and emigrated to the United States at the age of two. From 1925 to 1926 he studied at the School of the Art Institute of Chicago, In 1930 he won the Logan Medal of the Arts, then moved to New York City to take classes at the National Academy of Design with George Luks and at Columbia University, where he studied logic and philosophy.

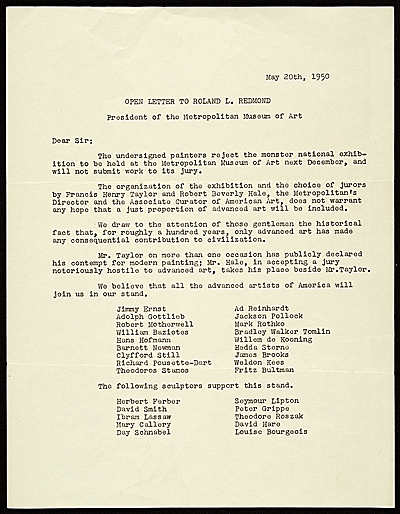
The statement, entitled OPEN LETTER TO ROLAND L. REDMOND, dated May 20, 1950, appeared on the front page of the New York Times of May 22, 1950. American abstract artists who put name to an open letter to the president of the Metropolitan Museum of Art were rejecting the museum's exhibition American Painting Today - 1950 and boycotting the competition.

Roszak established a studio in New York City in 1932 and worked as an artist for the Works Progress Administration during the depression before going back to Chicago to teach at the Art Institute. He taught at Sarah Lawrence College throughout the 1940s and 1950s and at Columbia University from 1970 to 1973. He was a participating artist at the documenta II in Kassel 1959 and at the Venice Biennale in 1960. Roszak's sculpture, at first closer to Constructivism and displaying an industrial aesthetic, changed after around 1946 to a more expressionistic style.

Roszak was affiliated with the Skowhegan School of Painting and Sculpture, the National Institute of Arts and Letters, the American Academy in Rome, and the National Academy of Design. He served on the U.S. Commission of Fine Arts from 1963 to 1969. He received the Logan Medal of the Arts (1930), a Tiffany Foundation Fellowship (1931), and the Eisendrath Award of the Art Institute of Chicago (1934). Roszak was also an accomplished violinist, and liked to use musical references in his artworks. Roszak died in New York City, where he lived.

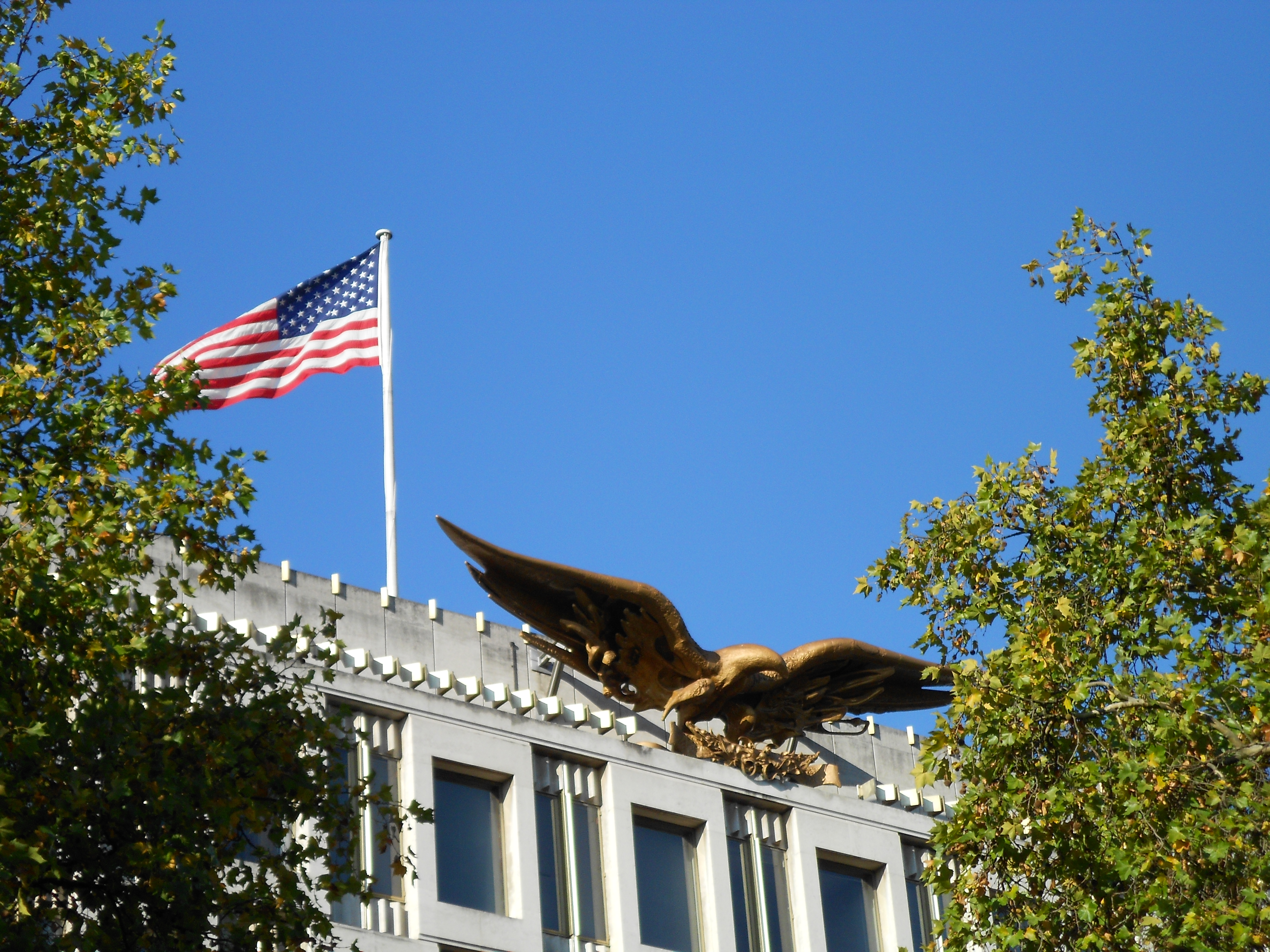
Eagle on the former US Embassy in London, sculpted by Roszak

Roszak sculpted the 35-foot (11 m) gilded aluminum eagle on the pediment of the former US Embassy in Grosvenor Square, London.
