= Tin Hinan =

4th-century Tuareg queen

- Tamenokalt
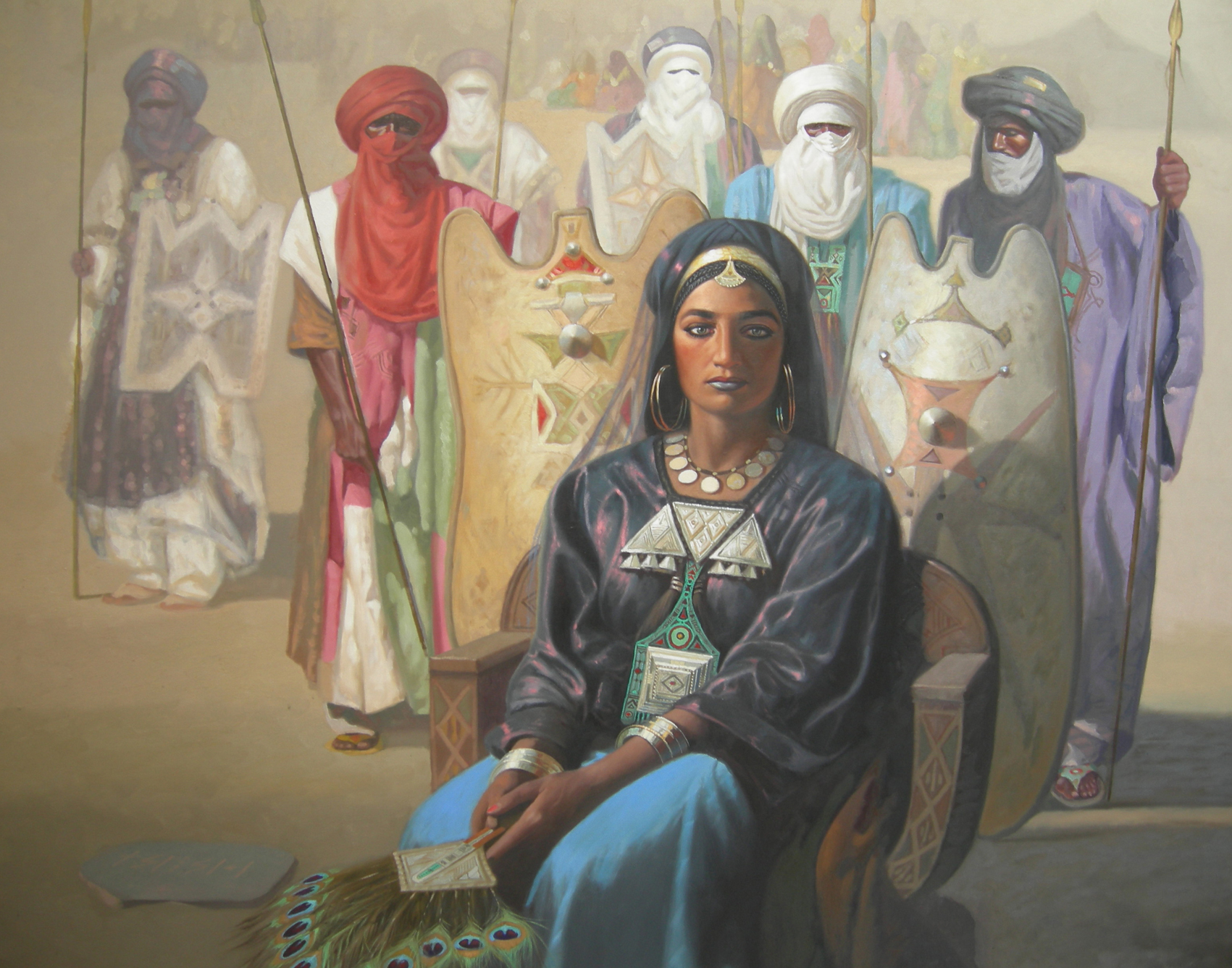
- An oil painting entitled, The Queen Tin Hinan, by Hocine Ziani.
- Reign: 4th-century
- Burial: Tin Hinan tomb
- Issue: Kella

Tin Hinan was a 4th-century Tuareg queen. What may be her monumental tomb is located in the Sahara, at Abalessa in the Hoggar region of Algeria.

== Queen of the Hoggar ==
=== Legends ===
Tin Hinan is sometimes referred to as "Queen of the Hoggar", and by the Tuareg as Tamenokalt which also means "queen". The name literally means "woman of the tents", but may be metaphorically translated as "mother of us all".

According to the stories told in the region, Tin Hinan was a "fugitive princess" who lived some time in the fourth century AD. Driven from the northern parts of the Sahara, she and her caravan of followers, so the stories go, nearly perished in the wilderness until they stumbled upon grain in desert anthills. In other legends less corroborated, Tin Hinan has been referred to as a Muslim. (Note: Given the date of her tomb, this is anachronistic.) In this legend, Tin Hinan had a daughter (or granddaughter), whose name is Kella, while Takamat had two daughters. These children are said to be the ancestors of the Tuareg of the Ahaggar. Another version is that Tin Hinan had three daughters (who had totemic names referring to desert animals) who were the tribal ancestors.

=== Tomb of Tin Hinan ===
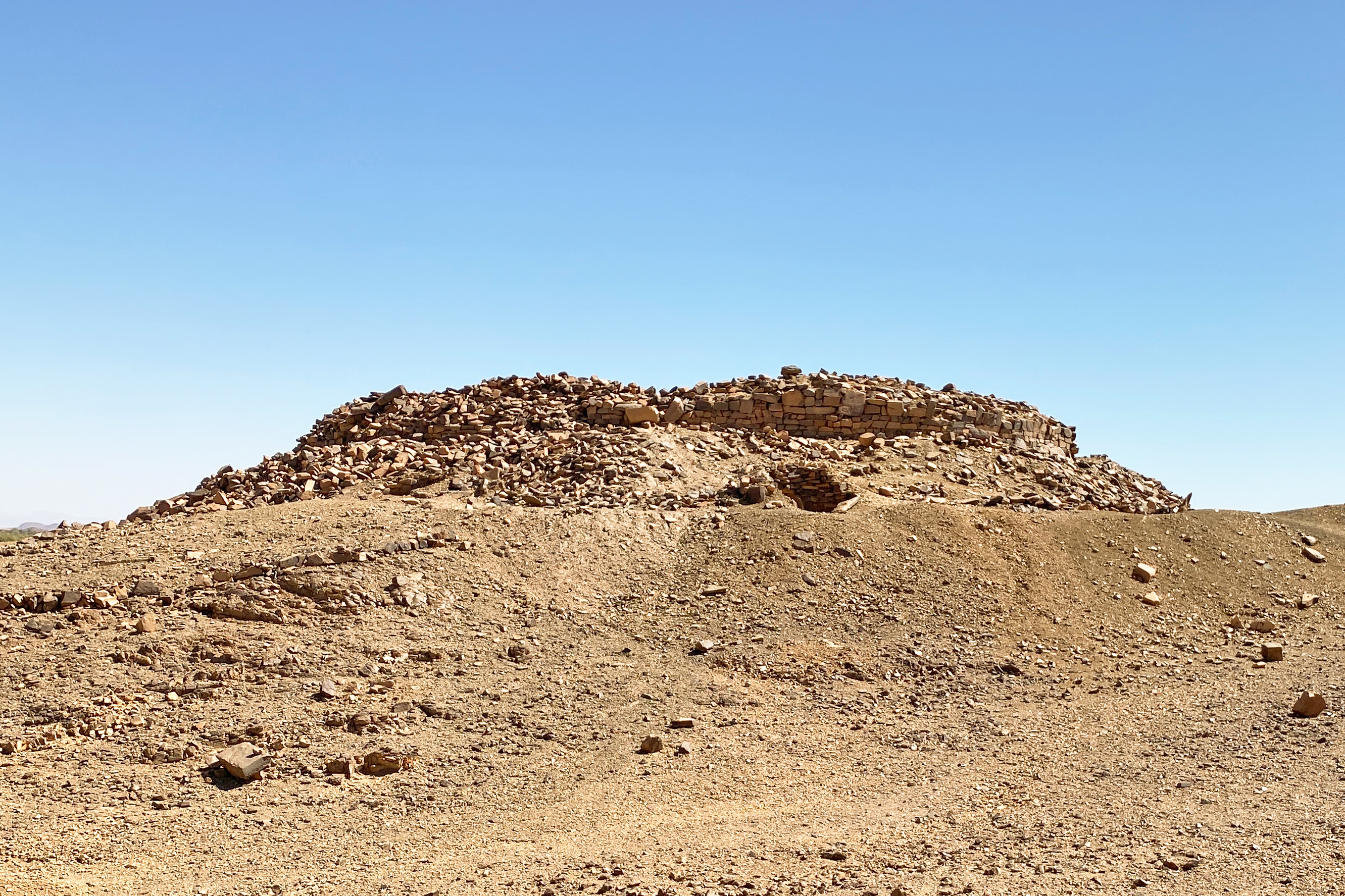
Tumulus where the tomb of Tin Hinan is located.

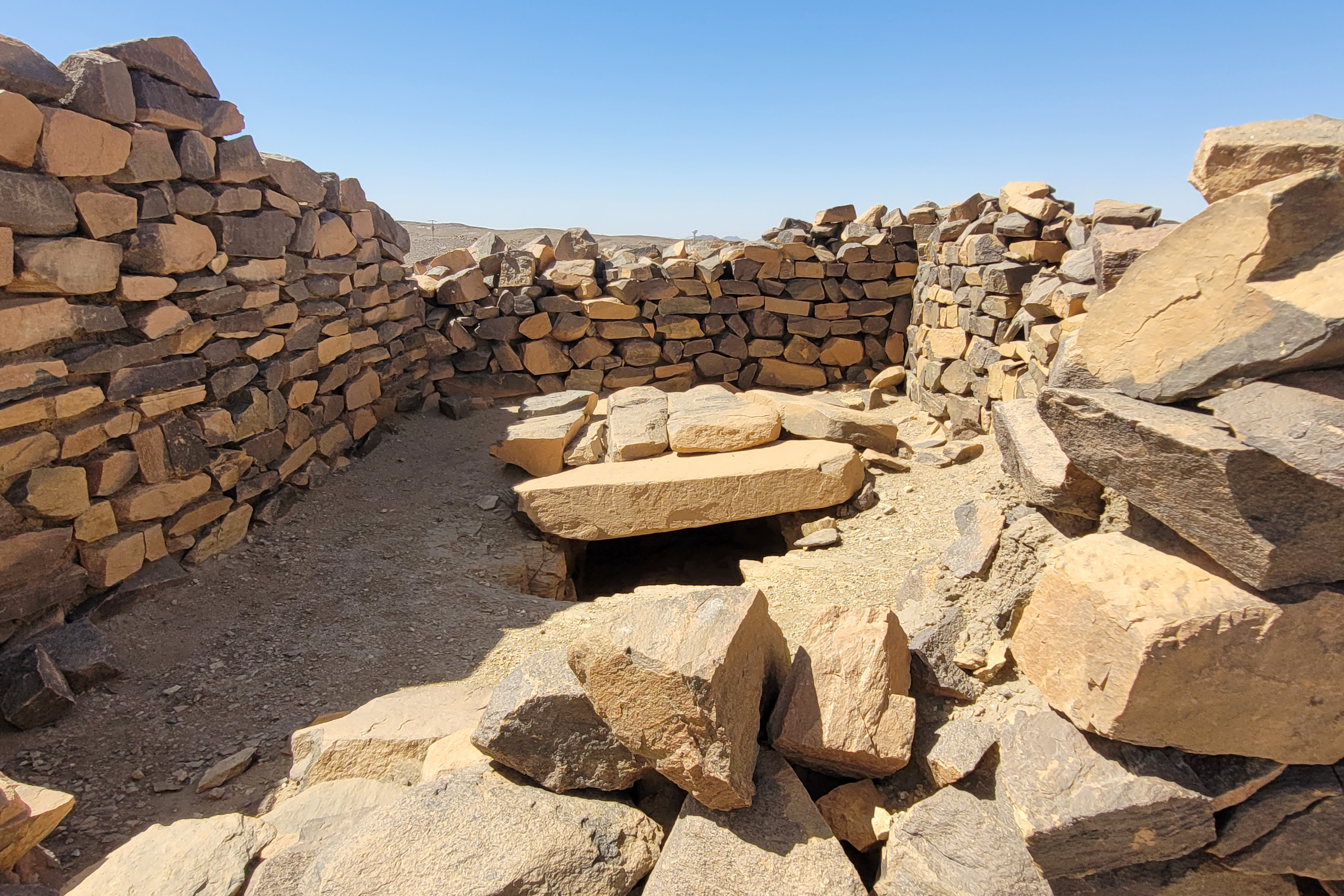
Tomb of Tin Hinan near Abalessa.

By the early twentieth century, the story of Tin Hinan had long been told, and many believed that it was simply a legend or a myth. However, in 1925, explorers discovered her tomb, proving that she was a historical figure. Located not far from the oasis of Abalessa, Algeria, about 1,000 miles (1550 kilometers) south of Algiers, on a rounded hill rising about 125 ft (38 meters) above the junction of two wadis, the tomb is pear-shaped in plan with a major axis of about 88 ft (27 meters). It contains 11 rooms or courts.

The tomb of Tin Hinan was opened by Byron Khun de Prorok with support from the French army in 1925, and archaeologists made a more thorough investigation in 1933. It was found to contain the skeleton of a woman (probably buried in the fourth century AD) on a wooden litter, lying on her back with her head facing east. She was accompanied by heavy gold and silver jewellery, some of it adorned with pearls. On her right forearm she wore seven silver bracelets, and on her left, 7 gold bracelets. Another silver bracelet and a gold ring were placed with the body. Remains of a complex piecework necklace of gold and pearls (real and artificial) were also present.

A number of funerary objects were also found. These included a "Venus" statue, a glass goblet (lost during World War II), barbed arrowheads of iron, an iron knife, and a gold foil which bore the imprint of a Roman coin of Constantine I issued between 308 and 324 CE. A 4th to 5th century date is consistent with carbon dating of the wooden bed and also with the style of pottery, a pottery lamp of third-century Roman type, and other tomb furniture. Tifinagh inscriptions are inscribed on the wall stones. The tomb itself is constructed in a style that is widespread in the Sahara.

An anthropological study of the remains concluded the skeleton was that of a tall middle-aged Berber woman. The body is now in the Bardo National Museum in Algiers.

== Bibliography ==
- Brett, Michael; Elizabeth Fentress (1997). The Berbers. WileyBlackwell. ISBN 978-0-631-20767-2.
- Camps, Gabriel (1974). "L'âge du tombeau de Tin Hinan, ancêtre des Touareg du Hoggar". Zephyrus. 25: 497–516.
