= Louis Conrad Rosenberg =

American artist and architect (1890–1983)

Louis Conrad Rosenberg (1890–1983) was an American artist, architect, author, and educator active between 1914 and 1966 known for his precise staging and rendering of architectural scenes in Europe and the United States during the 1920s and 1930s.

== Early life ==
Louis Conrad Rosenberg was born on May 6, 1890, in Portland, Oregon, to Charles and Hannah Rosenberg, and as a child he demonstrated an early aptitude for sketching and drawing. In 1906, when Rosenberg turned 16, his mother arranged for him to apprentice at the office of T. Chapell Brown, a local Portland architect. Rosenberg began his study of architecture in Brown's office and stayed there for two years as an unpaid intern, after which he was promoted to staff draftsman. Later, he came into contact with another Portland architect, Ellis Fuller Lawrence, who hired Rosenberg to be a draftsman and renderer in his office, and who would later prove instrumental in Rosenberg's future education and career. In 1912, Rosenberg was awarded a college scholarship from The Architectural Club of Oregon, and at the urging of E. F. Lawrence, applied to study architecture at The Massachusetts Institute of Technology.

== Education ==
In 1912, having distinguished himself as an architectural artist and renderer, Rosenberg was awarded a scholarship by the Architectural Club of Portland. His employer and mentor, E. F. Lawrence encouraged the young man to attend The Massachusetts Institute of Technology, from which Rosenberg graduated in 1914. While at M.I.T. Rosenberg's formidable skills as a draftsman and architectural artist set him apart from his classmates, and he was awarded the M.I.T. Traveling Fellowship in Architecture, entitling him to two years' study abroad. Unfortunately, Europe was in turmoil over what were the beginnings of World War I, and Rosenberg put off his planned trip abroad. However, Ellis Lawrence, who was then establishing the school of architecture at The University of Oregon, invited Rosenberg to return home to join the faculty as Assistant to the Dean and teach.

In 1917, upon America's entry into the war, Rosenberg enlisted in the U.S. Army and joined the American Expeditionary Force (AEF) when it sailed for Europe. He served with The Camouflage Corps, 40th Engineers, under the command of Aymar Embury, a noted New York architect, who formed an 8-man team of professional artists to document the activities of the AEF in France. Along with Louis Rosenberg this unit included Jules Andre Smith, another fine artist who would attract critical notice and attention following the cessation of hostilities in 1918. Rosenberg returned to the U.S. in 1919, and following his demobilization from military service, joined the faculty of the University of Oregon, where he continued teaching design and married Marie Louise Allen of Portland.

In June 1920, Rosenberg and his wife embarked for Europe to take advantage of his Traveling Fellowship. The next two years were fruitful, as he toured the Continent and coasted the Mediterranean visiting Southern Europe, North Africa, and The Levant. An inveterate note-taker, he filled dozens of copy books with sketches and studies of monuments, markets, and architectural scenes both great and small. Towards the end of his tour Rosenberg visited The American Academy in Rome, where he met two men whose influence would prove instrumental in the future course of his life: the American Robert Fulton Logan, from whom he took instruction in the craft of etching, and William Walcot, the British architect and illustrator whose fantastical historic recreations were the rage of London. Logan taught him how to etch, and through Walcot Rosenberg met H. C. Dickins, one of England's principal fine art dealers and publishers.

While at The American Academy Rosenberg produced a series of etchings between the Fall of 1921 and the Spring of 1922 - The Rome Series, which began his career as a fine artist. One of these prints, St. Peter's Colonnade, would be awarded a Silver Medal from The California Printmakers Society in 1922. But Rosenberg was not yet ready to chance the uncertain rewards of an artist's life, and returned to the United States where he joined the firm of York and Sawyer in New York. It was at this time that the British artist Muirhead Bone, an acquaintance of Phillip Sawyer, visited New York, and was struck by Rosenberg's technical and artistic work. By Bone's encouragement and influence, Rosenberg was invited to attend The School of Engraving at The Royal College of Art in London, where he studied under the master printmaker Malcolm Osborne, A.R.A. starting in 1924. Over the next year he produced two dozen prints, two of which were awarded the Chicago Society of Etchers Logan Prize, another the Society of Brooklyn Etchers Prize, and seven of which were included in a volume of The American Etcher series (Volume X).

== Career ==
Louis Conrad Rosenberg made his living as an architect, educator, author, and fine artist. He transitioned freely among these different vocations over the course of his life as circumstances dictated, and enjoyed substantial success in all three. Though he began his career as a practicing architect, and returned to the profession several times, it was as a fine artist that he enjoyed his greatest recognition and reward. His 171 etching and drypoint estate prints, as well as scores of architectural illustrations and renderings in pencil, ink, watercolor and photographs have been archived at The University of Oregon in their Special Collections Division. He is considered, along with fellow M.I.T. graduates and World War I veterans John Taylor Arms and Samuel Vance Chamberlain, among America's greatest traditional architectural artists.

Rosenberg was recognized repeatedly with awards, prizes, exhibitions, and publications. His awards and prizes included the Silver Medal, California Printmaker's Society in 1924; The Logan Prize given by The Chicago Society of Etchers in the years 1925, 1927, and 1932; the Brooklyn Society of Etchers Prize in 1926, as well as Mrs. Henry F. Noyes Prize in 1932 and the John Taylor Arms Prize in 1938; and The Fine Arts Medal, The Architectural Institute of America in 1949. His alma mater, The Massachusetts Institute of Technology, established the Louis C. Rosenberg (1913) Traveling Fellowship in his honor, a highly sought-after prize that continues to be awarded today.

His work was exhibited by The American Academy, Rome in 1922; by The Royal Academy in London in 1925, 1926, and 1928; by The Royal Society of Painter-Etchers in 1927, 1928, 1932, and 1954; by The Chicago Society of Etchers in 1926, 1929, 1932, 1935, and 1939; by The Brooklyn Society of Etchers in 1928; by The Society of American Etchers in 1931, 1932, 1934, 1935, 1938, 1939, and 1940; by The National Arts Club in 1929; by The Cleveland Printmakers in 1931; by The Print Club of Philadelphia in 1932 and 1940; by The California Printmakers in 1934; by The Art Institute of Chicago in 1934 and 1938; by The Municipal Art Society, New York in 1934; by The National Academy in 1937; by The World's Fair, New York in 1939; and by The Massachusetts Institute of Technology in 1962.

His work was included in the annual editions of Fine Prints of the Year, published by Halston and Truscott Smith, London, in the years 1924, 1925, 1926, 1927, 1929, 1930, 1931, 1933, 1934, 1935, and 1936. He was the subject of Modern Masters of Etching, Number 22, L. C. Rosenberg, A.R.E. in 1922; of American Etchers, Volume X, Louis C. Rosenberg, The Crafton Collection, New York, 1930; as well as numerous articles and critical reviews in publications such as The Print Collector's Quarterly in 1928, American Artist in 1946, 1947, and 1957; Architecture Magazine in 1935, and various books published by The Architectural Book Publishing Company.

== Life ==
With the start of World War II, Rosenberg enlisted in the U.S. Army and was assigned to a camouflage unit under the command of Aymar Embury, a New York architect. His company was sent to North Africa, where Rosenberg sketched and water-colored. These are included in the book Middle East War Projects of Johnson, Drake, and Piper, Inc., for the Army Corps of Engineers, 1942–43. The unit was broken up after eighteen months at which time Rosenberg returned to Portland, where he worked with local architects Glenn Stanton and Hollis Johnston for three years. He was living in Fairfield, Connecticut in 1946. He died in Oregon City, Oregon in 1983.

== Societies ==
Rosenberg was an active professional citizen, and was admitted as a Senior Fellow of The Royal Society of Painter-Etchers in 1931; a member of The Royal Society for the Encouragement of Arts, Manufacturers and Commerce, London in 1936; an Academician of The National Academy of Design in 1932; and a member of The Architectural Institute of America in 1952; along with memberships in The American Institute of Architects, The Brooklyn Society of Etchers (after 1922 The Society of American Etchers, which then became the Society of American Graphic Artists in 1952), The Chicago Society of Etchers, The Philadelphia Society of Etchers, and The Chelsea Arts Club, London.

== Collections ==
His work is held in the collections of the National Gallery of Art in Washington D.C., the Library of Congress, the Smithsonian American Art Museum, the Royal Academy of Arts in London, the Victoria and Albert Museum, the British Museum, the Brooklyn Museum, the New York Public Library, the Fine Art Museums of San Francisco, the Cleveland Museum of Art, the Museum of Fine Arts, Boston, the Harvard Art Museums, the Birmingham Museum of Art, the Mattatuck Museum, the Allen Memorial Art Museum, the Albright-Knox Art Gallery, the Indianapolis Museum of Art, the Clark Art Institute, the Museum of New Zealand Te Papa Tongarewa, the Hood Museum of Art, the Detroit Institute of Arts, the Modern Art Museum of Fort Worth, the Syracuse University Art Museum, Mount Vernon, the Baltimore Museum of Art, the Aberdeen Archives, Gallery, and Museums, the Crystal Bridges Museum of American Art, the Portland Art Museum, the Nelson-Atkins Museum of Art, the Delaware Art Museum, the University of Michigan Museum of Art, and the Carnegie Museum of Art.

== See also ==
- Logan Medal of the arts
