= Van Hoesen =

Van Hoesen is a surname. Notable people with the surname include:

- Beth Van Hoesen (1926–2010), American artist
- Henry Bartlett van Hoesen, (1885–1965), American librarian at Brown University
- K. David van Hoesen (1926–2016), bassoonist
- Peter Van Hoesen (born 1970), Belgian musician and composer

== See also ==
- Jan Van Hoesen House, a house in Columbia County, New York, United States
