= Society of Western Artists (1939–present) =

The Society of Western Artists began as a San Francisco branch of the Society for Sanity in Art, an American artist's society whose members strongly opposed all forms of modernism. In 1939, it changed its name to the Society of Western Artists, in 2000 it changed its name to the Society of West-Coast Artists, and today is the largest society of representational artists in the western United States.
