= Carl Hallsthammar =

American sculptor (1894–1977)

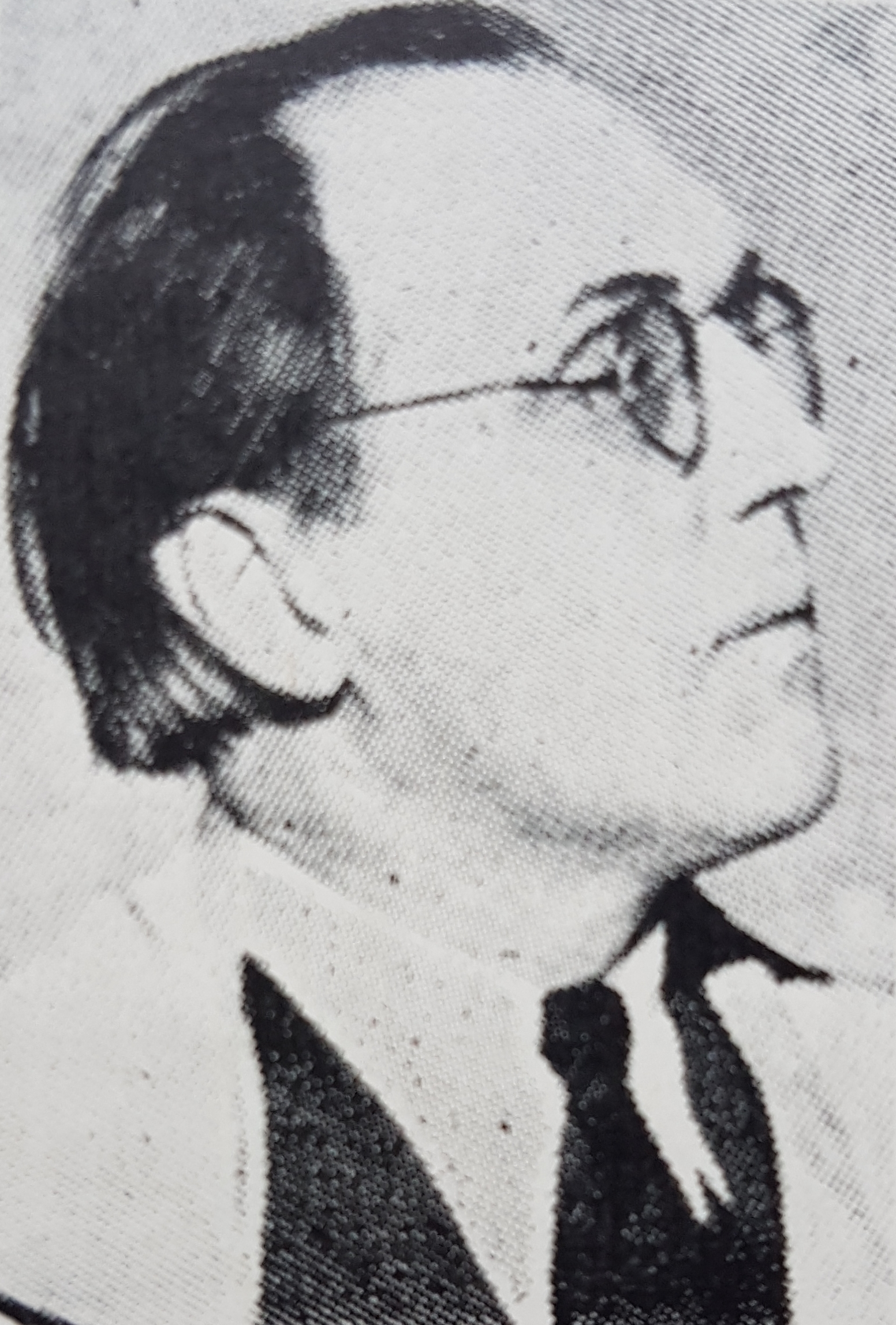
- Born: June 13, 1894; Hallstahammar, Sweden
- Died: February 12, 1977 (aged 82); San Fernando, California, United States
- Occupation: Sculptor

Carl Hallsthammar (June 13, 1894 – February 12, 1977) was an American sculptor. His work was part of the sculpture event in the art competition at the 1932 Summer Olympics.
