= Society for Sanity in Art =

The Society for Sanity in Art was an organization of American artists strongly opposed all forms of modern art, including cubism, surrealism, and abstract expressionism. The group changed its name in January 1947 to the Society of Western Artists.

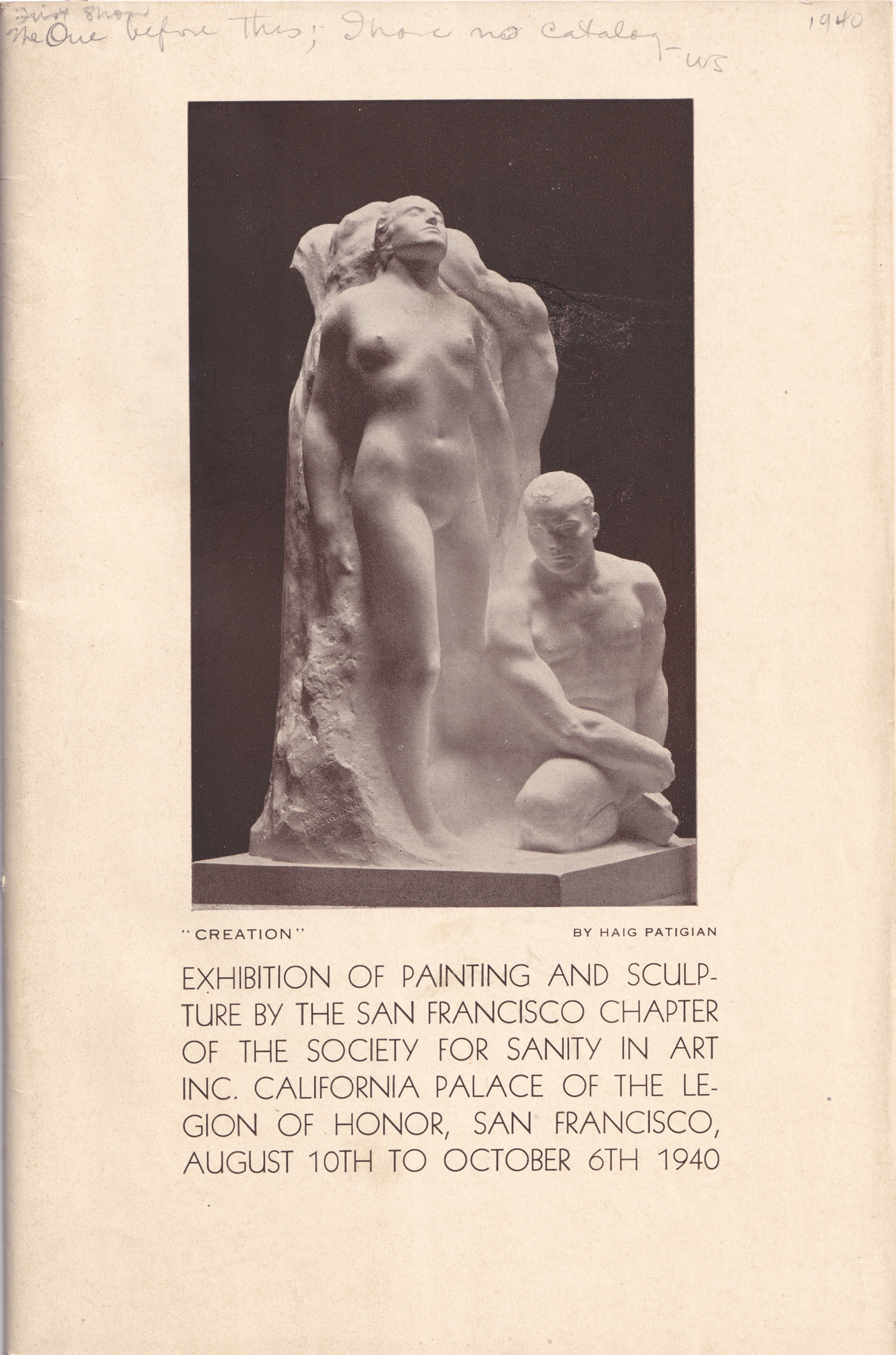
Front cover of catalog for 1940 Society for Sanity in Art exhibition at California Palace of the Legion of Honor, San Francisco. Pencil note at top by William Horace Smith, president of Sanity in Art's successor organization, the Society of Western Artists.

== History ==
The society was founded in Chicago in 1936 by Josephine Hancock Logan (May 1, 1862 – November 1, 1943), and eventually had branches is most US cities, with major branches in Boston and San Francisco. Ms. Logan also published a book entitled Sanity in Art in 1937.

Haig Patigian was the group's president in the 1940s. Margaret Fitzhugh Browne founded the Boston branch, and led it in protesting a 1940 exhibit of paintings by Picasso at the Museum of Fine Arts, Boston. A western branch of the Society changed its name to the Society of Western Artists in 1939; it is currently the largest society of representational artists in the western US. The society's San Francisco branch sponsored an annual art exhibit-for-sale by its members at the California Palace of the Legion of Honor at least as late as 1945.

Artists that supported the group's cause included William Winthrop Ward, Florence Louise Bryant, Percy Gray, Rudolph F. Ingerle, Frank Montague Moore, Thomas Hill, Claude Buck, Frank Charles Peyraud, Theodore Wores and Chauncey Foster Ryder.

The Society gave awards to artists who met its standards of "sanity", including the Logan Medal of the Arts.
