= Abraham Harriton =

Romanian-born American modernist artist (1893–1986)

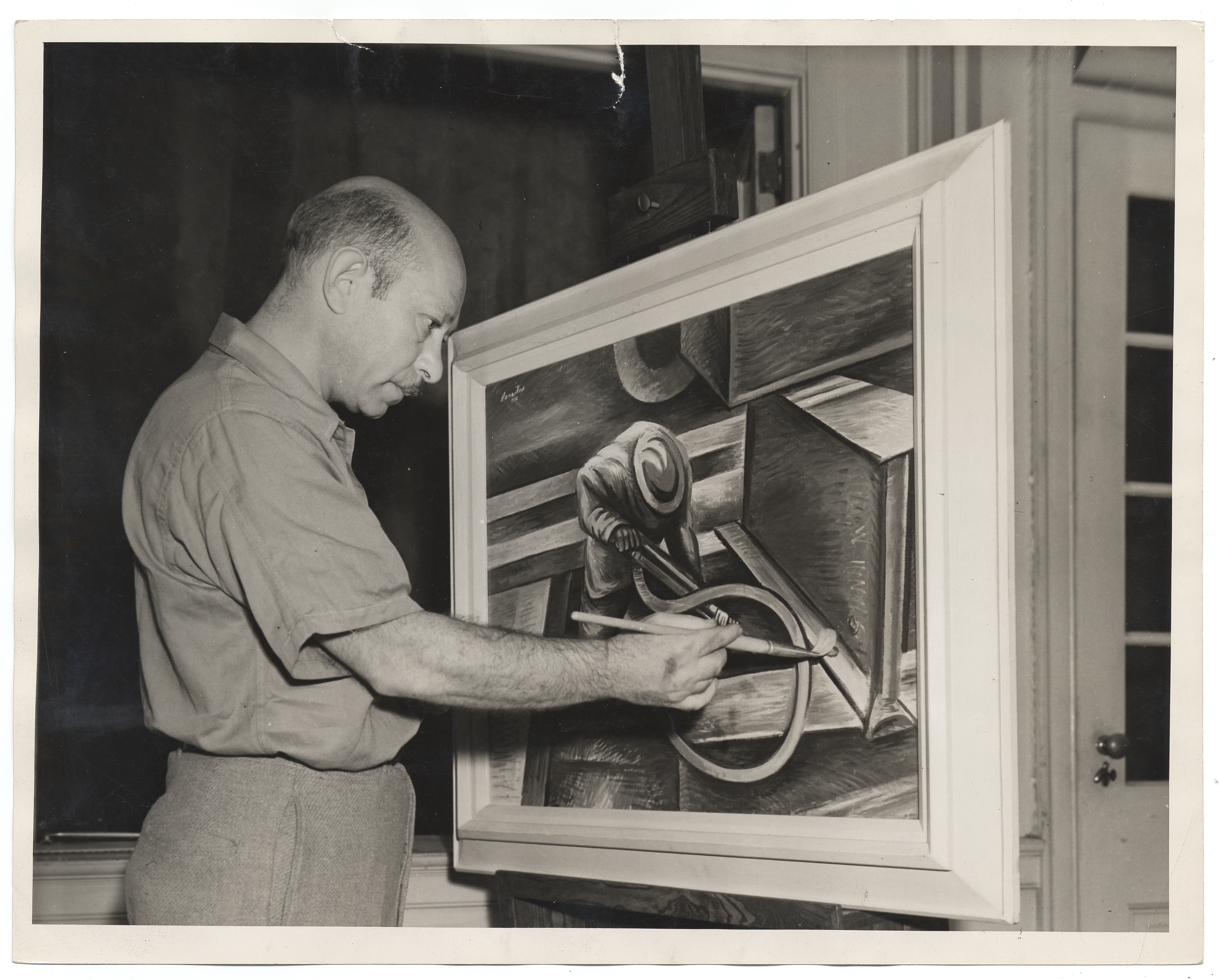
- Harriton working on a painting for the 1939 World's Fair, 1938
- Born: 1893; Bucharest, Kingdom of Romania
- Died: 1986 (aged 92–93); Long Island, New York, U.S.
- Education: National Academy of Design
- Known for: Painting
- Movement: Modernist; Social realism

Abraham Harriton was a Romanian-born American modernist artist and social realism painter in the United States.

== Early life and education ==
Born in 1893 in Bucharest, then the Kingdom of Romania, Harriton studied at the National Academy of Design in New York City from 1908 until 1915. There, he studied under artists such as Kenyon Cox, Emil Carlsen and George DeForest Brush.

== Career ==
Harriton later become a teacher at the National Academy of Design, and, like many other artists during the Great Depression, received commissions from the Works Progress Administration during the 1930s.

His 1939 mural for the Augusta, Georgia post office Plantation, Transportation, Education, commissioned by the Treasury Section of Fine Arts, is on display at the Augusta Convention and Visitor's Bureau.

Harrinton had strong ties with the American Left, displaying his works at exhibits hosted by the John Reed Club.

== Personal life ==
At the time of his death in 1986, Harriton was survived by his wife, Estelle, their son, Charles and their daughter, Maria.
