= Laura van Pappelendam =

American painter

Laura Van Pappelendam
- Born: Laura Peternellie van Pappelendam; February 10, 1883; Donnellson, Iowa, U.S.
- Died: February 10, 1974 (aged 91); Norwalk, California, U.S.
- Other name: Laura Pappelendam
- Education: School of the Art Institute of Chicago
- Known for: Painting

Laura Peternellie Van Pappelendam (1883–1974) was an American painter and teacher. She was Professor Emeritus at the School of the Art Institute of Chicago.

== Biography ==
Laura Peternellie Van Pappelendam was born in Keokuk, Iowa on February 10, 1883. Van Pappelendam was the daughter of Alice (née McCullough) and John Bernard Van Pappelendam. She moved to Chicago to study at the School of the Art Institute of Chicago (formally Art Institute of Chicago), from 1904 to 1911.

During the summers of 1920 to 1927 and 1950 to 1955, she painted in Santa Fe, New Mexico. In the late 1930s she spent summers in Mexico, studying under Diego Rivera.

She taught at the Art Institute of Chicago from 1909 to 1959; and well as the University of Chicago from 1918 to 1948. She exhibited at the Art Institute Annuals, with the Chicago Society of Artists and at the Arts Club and Renaissance Society.

Van Pappelendam died in Norwalk, California on her birthday, February 10, 1974.
