= Logan Museum of Anthropology =

Anthropology museum in Beloit, Wisconsin

Coordinates: 42°30′06.4″N 89°01′49.1″W

- Location: Beloit, Wisconsin, United States
- Type: Anthropology museum
- Accreditation: American Alliance of Museums
- Collections: Albert Green Heath Collection; North African Paleolithic & Saharan Collections; Mimbres, Mandan, and Arikara Archaeology; Horatio Nelson Rust Collection; Bartlett Southeast Asian Collection; Ainu Collection; Clara Frances Bristol Oaxacan Collection; The Clay Bison Cast; John W. Norton Murals; Illinois River Valley Collections
- Collection size: 400,000
- Founder: Frank Granger Logan
- Director: Nicolette Blum Meister
- Website: beloit.edu/logan

Logan Museum of Anthropology is a museum of Beloit College, located in Beloit, Wisconsin, United States. It was founded in 1894 by Beloit trustee and patron of the arts Frank Granger Logan and contains over 400,000 archaeological and ethnological objects from around the world. Its collections and exhibitions relate to indigenous cultures of the Western Hemisphere, Oceania, and other parts of the world, including European and North African Paleolithic cultures. The Logan Museum was accredited by the American Alliance of Museums in 1972 and again in 2007.
