= Carl R. Krafft =

American painter (1884–1938)

Carl Rudolph Krafft (August 23, 1884 – October 18, 1938) was an American painter, printmaker, and commercial artist based in the Chicago area. He worked primarily in landscape painting, particularly scenes of the Ozark Mountains, and also produced etchings, lithographs, and watercolors. Krafft was a member of the Palette and Chisel Academy of Fine Arts and co-founded the Society of Ozark Painters in 1914 alongside Rudolph F. Ingerle, Frank Nuderscher, Oscar E. Berninghaus, and Carl Gustave Waldeck. He was also the founder of the arts organization now known as the Oak Park Art League — established as the Austin, Oak Park, and River Forest Art League and renamed in 1970 — which promotes art exhibitions and education in the western Chicago suburbs.

== Early life and education ==
Krafft was born in Reading, Ohio, on August 23, 1884, into a German-American family. His father, Carl F. L. Krafft, was a Lutheran minister who had emigrated from Bavaria. His family background included a connection to the artistic tradition of the Krafft family of Nuremberg, associated with the sixteenth-century sculptor Adam Kraft.

The family later relocated to Chicago, where Carl grew up on the South Side. As a child, he showed an early interest in drawing and music, but explored careers in business and religious studies, including a period at Elmhurst College, before committing to art.

Krafft began his professional life in commercial art, working as a designer and illustrator. He studied at the School of the Art Institute of Chicago, initially through evening classes and later in day classes, studying under Harry M. Walcott, Edward Vysekal, and Antonin Sterba, then later under Leon Kroll and Eugene E. Savage. During this period, he became associated with fellow Chicago artists, Rudolph F. Ingerle and August Petrtyl.

== Career ==
=== Harvester Building Studio ===
Krafft and Rudolph Ingerle opened their own commercial art studio. Krafft, Ingerle, and August Petrtyl had studios in the Harvester Building at 606 S. Michigan Avenue in Chicago and showed their work there together in December 1914. Petrtyl ran a firm called the Publicity Art Shop at the same address. A letter of February 27, 1915, to Frank Werner of the Chicago Commission for the Encouragement of Local Art carries the signatures of all three. All three men were also members of the Palette and Chisel Academy of Fine Art.

=== The Ozarks and the Society of Ozark Painters ===
After first visiting the Ozark Mountains in Missouri around 1912 or 1913, Krafft returned frequently to paint the region's landscapes. In 1914, he co-founded the Society of Ozark Painters with Rudolph Ingerle and St. Louis-based artists Frank Nuderscher, Oscar E. Berninghaus, and Carl Gustave Waldeck. Krafft maintained studios in both Hollister and Arcadia, Missouri, traveling between them and his Chicago and (later) Oak Park, Illinois base throughout the 1910s and 1920s.

=== Oak Park and the Art League ===
Krafft maintained a studio in the Chicago area and from 1926 on lived and worked in Oak Park, Illinois. He was the founder of the Austin, Oak Park, and River Forest Art League, serving as its president from 1921 to 1922 and on its board of directors for many years. The organization was renamed the Oak Park Art League in 1970 and continues to operate today.

== Exhibitions and awards ==
During the 1910s and 1920s, Krafft exhibited regularly, including at the Art Institute of Chicago, the National Academy of Design, the Pennsylvania Academy of the Fine Arts, and the Corcoran Gallery of Art. He received recognition in juried exhibitions including:

- Englewood Prize, Art Institute of Chicago, 1915, for Ozark Zephyrs
- Municipal Art League Purchase Prize, Art Institute of Chicago, 1916, for Charms of the Ozarks
- Bronze Medal, Peoria Society of Allied Arts, 1920
- Mr. and Mrs. Frank G. Logan Second Medal, Art Institute of Chicago, 1920
- Chicago Society of Artists Silver Medal, Art Institute of Chicago, 1921
- Gold Medal of Honor, Allied Artists of America, 1925
- Mr. and Mrs. Frank G. Logan First Medal, Art Institute of Chicago, 1925

== Teaching ==
Krafft taught through institutional programs, local art leagues, and private classes, including at the Chicago Academy of Fine Arts (1915, 1926–1927), the School of the Art Institute of Chicago (summer outdoor painting, 1923–1924), and the Oak Park Art League (1925–1938). He also operated the Carl R. Krafft Outdoor School of Painting at Wildwood Station, Willow Springs, Illinois from 1921 to 1923. During the Great Depression, as the market for privately purchased art contracted, he supplemented his studio practice through teaching and participation in the Public Works of Art Project, a federal program that supported working artists through commissions.

== Style and subject matter ==
Krafft worked primarily in landscape painting, depicting rural environments, forests, rivers, and mountain landscapes. Art historian William H. Gerdts characterized his work as Post-Impressionist landscape painting. Chicago Daily News critic C. J. Bulliet described Krafft's Ozark landscapes as earning him the title "painter poet of the Ozarks."

In addition to landscape painting, Krafft produced portraits, figure studies, commercial illustrations, and prints, including etchings and lithographs. A memorial exhibition catalogue from the Art Institute of Chicago described his work as "developing independently" rather than belonging to any specific artistic movement.

== Later years ==
Krafft continued to exhibit during the 1930s. In 1933, two paintings — May Day and Businessmen's Avocation — were accepted for exhibition at the Art Institute of Chicago. Krafft died on October 18, 1938, in Oak Park, Illinois, at the age of 54, one year after his studio colleague August Petrtyl.

== Legacy ==
A memorial exhibition of his paintings was held at the Art Institute of Chicago in 1939. His paintings are held in the Union League Club of Chicago and in private collections.

== Selected works ==
- Ozark Zephyrs (1915) — Englewood Prize, Art Institute of Chicago
- Charms of the Ozarks (1916) — Municipal Art League Purchase Prize; Union League Club of Chicago collection
- Banks of the Gasconade (1920) — Logan Second Medal, Art Institute of Chicago
- Mississippi Nocturne (1925) — Logan First Medal, Art Institute of Chicago
- Hickory Creek (1925) — Gold Medal of Honor, Allied Artists of America
