= August Petrtyl =

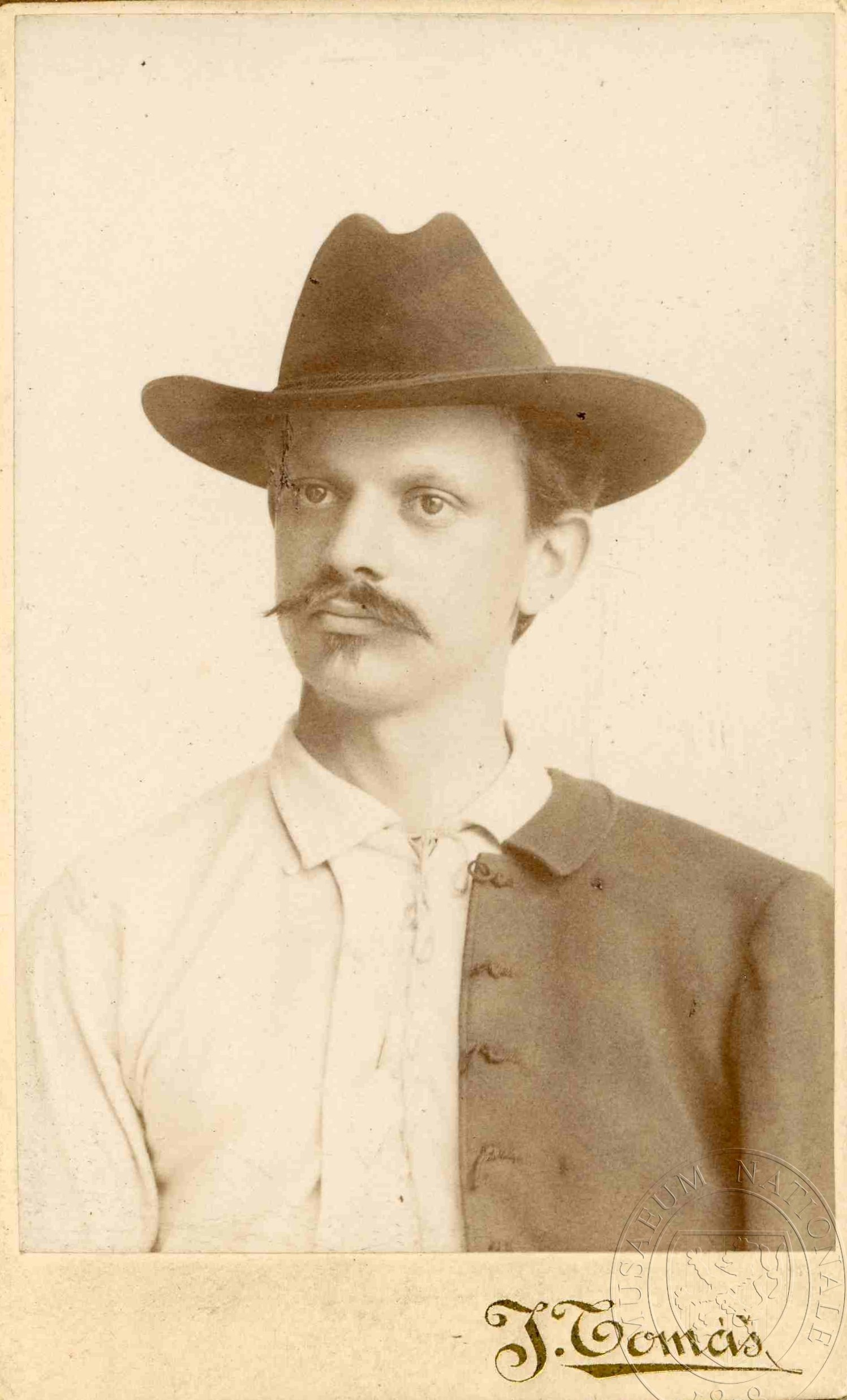
- Portrait of August Petrtyl
- Born: July 8, 1867; Bohemia, Austria-Hungary
- Died: November 8, 1937 (aged 70); Chicago, Illinois, U.S.
- Resting place: Bohemian National Cemetery; Chicago, Illinois, U.S.
- Known for: Painting, illustration, mural painting, commercial art

August Petrtyl (July 8, 1867 – November 8, 1937) was an American painter, muralist, illustrator and commercial artist. Born in Bohemia, he was based in Chicago, Illinois. He is known for his historical illustrations for the Alexandrian Romances series by author Marshall Monroe Kirkman, his mural work for the Lawndale National Bank in Chicago, his landscape design for the Bohemian National Cemetery, and his design of the collectible Green Spade Tarok playing card deck. Petrtyl was a member of the Palette and Chisel Academy of Fine Arts and shared a studio with fellow Chicago painters Carl R. Krafft and Rudolph F. Ingerle.

== Early life and immigration ==
Petrtyl was born on July 8, 1867, in Bohemia in Austria-Hungary, to Anton Petrtyl and Victoria Barta, both Bohemian natives. In July 1868, at approximately nine months of age, he and his family emigrated to the United States, departing from Bremen and arriving in New York City on July 31, 1868, aboard the ship Ariel. The family subsequently settled in Chicago, Illinois, where Petrtyl would spend the remainder of his life and career.

== Career ==
=== Publicity Art Shop and Harvester Building studio ===
Petrtyl operated a commercial venture called the Publicity Art Shop in the Harvester Building at 606 S. Michigan Avenue in Chicago, sharing the studio space with fellow painters Carl R. Krafft and Rudolph F. Ingerle. A letter dated February 27, 1915, addressed to Frank Werner of the Chicago Commission for the Encouragement of Local Art, bears the signatures of all three artists, confirming their professional collaboration. All three were members of the Palette and Chisel Academy of Fine Arts.

Petrtyl joined several fellow Palette and Chisel Club members on painting excursions throughout the region, including a trip to Brown County, Indiana in the summer of 1910 with Victor Higgins, Otto Hake, and Rudolph F. Ingerle, and painting trips to the Ozark Mountains of Missouri with Krafft and Ingerle. Krafft and Ingerle went on to co-found the Society of Ozark Painters in 1914 alongside St. Louis-based artists Frank Nuderscher, Oscar E. Berninghaus, and Carl Gustave Waldeck. In December 1914, Petrtyl and Ingerle participated in a joint exhibition at their shared studio at 606 S. Michigan, coinciding with a concurrent exhibition of Krafft's Ozark Mountain scenes.

=== Book illustration ===
Petrtyl worked as a commercial illustrator throughout his career. He collaborated with writer Marshall Monroe Kirkman on the Alexandrian Romances, a series of historical fiction focused on Alexander the Great. Petrtyl contributed detailed color plates, maps, and frontispieces to the 1909 trilogy. The series included:

- Iskander: A Romance of the Court of Philip of Macedon and Alexander the Great
- The Romance of Alexander the Prince
- The Romance of Alexander the King
- The Romance of Alexander and Roxana

Editions from this series remain in circulation and are held in collections including the Library of Congress and HathiTrust. Newspapers of the period frequently credited Petrtyl by name as the illustrator in advertisements for the books.

=== Commercial and graphic design ===
Petrtyl also worked extensively in commercial design. He created cover art for major trade publications, including the October 1924 issue of The Inland Printer, a leading journal of the American printing industry.

He also designed the Green Spade Tarok deck, an intricate set of Czech-style tarot playing cards documented in period sources and available through auction and collectibles markets.

In 1922, Petrtyl designed a variant of the Central European card game Königrufen with American-themed cards, replacing traditional figures with American characters: Uncle Sam as the Sküs, Papoose as the Pagat, and Chiefs as the Kings. There is no evidence the variant was adopted for play.

=== Murals and public works ===
Petrtyl painted six large murals for the Lawndale National Bank in Chicago.

In 1902, he drafted the landscape expansion designs for the Bohemian National Cemetery in Chicago, contributing graceful curving sections to the cemetery's eastward and southward expansion.

== Death ==
Petrtyl died on November 8, 1937 at the age of 70 in Chicago. He was buried on November 11, 1937, at the Bohemian National Cemetery in Chicago — the same institution whose landscape expansion he had helped design 35 years earlier.
