= Antonin Sterba =

American painter (1875–1963)

- Born: Antonin Sterba; February 11, 1875; Heřmaneč, Moravia, Austria-Hungary
- Died: April 8, 1963 (aged 88)
- Education: J. Francis Smith Academy for Art and School of the Art Institute of Chicago
- Occupations: Portrait artist and educator
- Spouse: Mabel Messenger

Antonin Sterba (February 11, 1875 – April 8, 1963) was a Czech-born American portrait painter, educator, and printmaker based in Chicago, Illinois. He is known for his luminous portrait paintings, his long tenure on the faculty of the School of the Art Institute of Chicago, and his role in a notable episode of Chicago art history involving the J. Francis Smith Academy for Art. Among his students were Walter Ufer, Hovsep Pushman, Chauncey Ryder, and Carl R. Krafft. His work is held in the collections of the National Portrait Gallery at the Smithsonian Institution, the Chicago History Museum, Northwestern University, and DePauw University, among others.

== Early life and education ==
Sterba was born on February 11, 1875, in Heřmaneč, Moravia, then part of Austria-Hungary (now the Czech Republic). His family emigrated to the United States when he was approximately three years old, settling in Chicago, where he would spend most of his life and career. In Chicago, Sterba studied at the J. Francis Smith Academy for Art on Wabash Avenue and at the School of the Art Institute of Chicago, receiving the Gold Medal of Honor at the Smith Academy in 1899. He subsequently traveled to Paris, where he spent two years studying at the Académie Julian under Jean-Paul Laurens and Benjamin-Constant.

== Career ==
=== Smith Academy and the "Jerry" rebellion ===
On returning from Paris, Sterba joined the faculty of the J. Francis Smith Academy for Art as an instructor, teaching there for eight years. The Smith Academy, operated by John Francis Smith on Wabash Avenue, attracted a progressive student body that included Walter Ufer, Hovsep Pushman, Ossip Linde, and Chauncey Ryder. When Smith sold the academy, and the new owners transferred all students and their effects to the School of the Art Institute of Chicago, students led by Ossip Linde staged a protest. Demanding the return of their personal property — including the studio skeleton known as "Jerry," which had been at Smith's "from time immemorial" — the students paraded noisily through Chicago's streets carrying the skeleton at their head. They subsequently organized their own independent school with Sterba as instructor, which operated briefly before financial pressures forced a capitulation. The students re-entered negotiations with the Art Institute, which admitted them as a unit and retained Sterba as their instructor. The Art Institute's director, William M. R. French, accommodated the group by setting aside a dedicated classroom.

=== Art Institute of Chicago ===
Sterba joined the faculty of the School of the Art Institute of Chicago in 1910, teaching evening classes there while also teaching afternoon classes at the American Academy of Art. He remained on the Art Institute faculty for decades, and between 1903 and 1938 his paintings were featured in thirty exhibitions at the museum. Among the students Sterba taught at the Art Institute was Anthony Angarola, for whom he served as primary mentor from 1908 onward, with Angarola remaining in Sterba's atelier through February 1914. Carl R. Krafft, the Chicago landscape painter and co-founder of the Society of Ozark Painters, also studied under Sterba at the Art Institute during this period. Chicago Daily News critic C. J. Bulliet described Sterba as "even better known among artists of Chicago and over America as an instructor — competent, sympathetic, and courageous."

=== Portrait career ===
Sterba worked primarily as a portrait painter throughout his career. Among his documented portrait subjects were Dr. H. A. Govin, a former president of DePauw University, whose portrait hangs in a chapel on the university's campus in Greencastle, Indiana; Professor Albert Wyness Millar of Northwestern University Law School, whose portrait hangs in the faculty room of the McKinlock Campus; Chicago poet Wilbur D. Nesbit; Dr. George Craig Stewart of St. Luke's Church in Evanston, Illinois; novelist Henry Kitchell Webster; composer and pianist Arne Oldberg; and painter Frederick Victor Poole. His painting Chris Marie (Girl with the Golden Shawl) (1928) is held in the permanent collection of the Union League Club of Chicago and is considered among his most accomplished works. He exhibited portraits at the Corcoran Gallery of Art in Washington, D.C., the Pennsylvania Academy of the Fine Arts in Philadelphia, and the Art Institute of Chicago.

=== California and Mexico ===
In 1929, Sterba took a year's leave of absence from the Art Institute, living and working in an adobe house on the outskirts of Los Angeles. During this period he painted the Baroness of Stackelberg, a Russian émigré, against a background of pepper trees and poinsettias. He subsequently traveled to interior Mexico, where he produced his first etchings, depicting peasants carrying home flowers at night.

== Style and teaching philosophy ==
Sterba worked primarily in portraiture, and his portraits were noted for strong characterization, dignity, and harmony. He also produced landscape paintings, still lifes, and prints. In 1999, his self-portrait and the painting The Girl with the Blue Vase (c. 1930) were included in Capturing Sunlight: The Art of Tree Studios, an exhibition at the Chicago Cultural Center. On teaching, Sterba advised students: "Build a foundation to hold a cathedral, not a chicken coop."

== Personal life ==
Sterba lived in Evanston, Illinois, where his home overlooked Lake Michigan. His wife, Mabel Messenger, was a poet and harpist; one of her published poems, "Upon an Inland Sea," described evening twilight over the lake. Despite his Bohemian birth, Sterba identified fully as an American and maintained no sentimental attachment to his birthplace, which he visited only once, briefly, during his Paris student years. He was a member of the All-Illinois Society of Fine Arts and the Bohemian Arts Club of Chicago.

== Death and legacy ==
Sterba died on April 8, 1963, in Chicago, Illinois, at the age of 88. His work is held in the collections of the National Portrait Gallery at the Smithsonian Institution, the Chicago History Museum, Northwestern University, DePauw University, and the Union League Club of Chicago, among other public and private collections.

== Selected works ==
- Chris Marie (Girl with the Golden Shawl) (1928) — Union League Club of Chicago permanent collection
- The Girl with the Blue Vase (c. 1930) — included in Capturing Sunlight: The Art of Tree Studios, Chicago Cultural Center, 1999
- Self-portrait — included in Capturing Sunlight: The Art of Tree Studios, Chicago Cultural Center, 1999; Municipal Art League Prize, 1938
- Portrait of Dr. H. A. Govin — DePauw University, Greencastle, Indiana
- Portrait of Prof. Albert Wyness Millar — Northwestern University Law School, McKinlock Campus
