= J. Francis Smith Academy for Art =

The J. Francis Smith Academy for Art was a private art school operated by John Francis Smith in Chicago, Illinois, during the late 19th and early 20th centuries, located on Wabash Avenue. The school was one of several independent art academies operating alongside the School of the Art Institute of Chicago during this period, and trained a number of artists who later achieved national recognition.

== History ==
John Francis Smith operated the academy, known variously as the Art Academy, the John Francis Smith Academy, and the J. Francis Smith Academy for Art, from at least 1898. Prior to establishing the academy in Chicago, Smith had worked as manager of the Reed and Gross Battle of Gettysburg panorama in San Francisco, documented in the San Francisco Call in June 1890.

Among the students trained at the academy were Walter Ufer, Hovsep Pushman, Chauncey Ryder, and Ossip Linde, as well as landscape painter Carl R. Krafft and portrait painter Antonin Sterba, who later joined the faculty. Frederick F. Fursman attended the academy in 1900–1901 before continuing his studies at the School of the Art Institute of Chicago. Rudolph F. Ingerle, who later co-founded the Society of Ozark Painters, also studied at the academy during the early 1900s.

Following Smith's sale of the academy, its students and faculty were absorbed into the School of the Art Institute of Chicago under an arrangement facilitated by the Art Institute's director, William M. R. French. Sterba joined the Art Institute faculty in 1910 following the transition, and several of the academy's former students went on to prominent careers in American art.
