= Berninghaus =

Berninghaus is a surname. Notable people with the surname include:

- Charles Berninghaus (1905–1988), American painter
- Oscar E. Berninghaus (1874–1952), American painter
