= Society of Ozark Painters =

American artists' organization

The Society of Ozark Painters was an American artists' organization founded in 1914, dedicated to painting the landscapes of the Ozark Mountains. The Society brought together painters from Chicago, Illinois and St. Louis, Missouri who were drawn to the region's distinctive atmospheric features, rolling forested hills, and rural character. It was one of several, regional art colonies established in the United States during the early 20th century, as American painters sought subjects beyond established artist communities such as Brown County, Indiana and the Hudson River Valley.

== Founding ==
The Society was co-founded in 1914 by five painters: Carl R. Krafft and Rudolph F. Ingerle of Chicago, and Frank Nuderscher, Oscar E. Berninghaus, and Carl Gustave Waldeck of St. Louis.

Krafft and Ingerle had first visited the Ozarks in 1913, searching for new subjects after establishing careers in Chicago's commercial and fine arts industries, and painting together in Brown County, Indiana. Nuderscher had discovered the Ozarks sometime after 1910, finding that his tonalistic approach to depicting atmospheric haze translated naturally to the region's misty hills and valleys. Oscar E. Berninghaus, already an established St. Louis painter and later a founding member of the Taos Society of Artists, brought additional prominence to the Society's group of founders.

== Activities and exhibitions ==
Members of the Society used Arcadia, Missouri as their primary painting base, with Krafft maintaining studios in both Hollister and Arcadia, traveling between them and his Chicago home throughout the 1910s and 1920s. Frank Nuderscher also purchased a house in Arcadia, where he and his family spent much of the 1920s, and later founded the Ozark School of Art there. The region around Arcadia and along the Gasconade River was a recurring subject in the Society members' paintings.

Springfield, Missouri served as the Society's primary exhibition city. In 1914, the year of the Society's founding, Krafft exhibited at both the Taneycomo Club and the Springfield Club in Missouri — the latter representing the Society's first documented Missouri exhibition. Krafft also founded the Municipal Art League in Springfield, further cementing the city's role as the Society's civic hub.

A pilot group exhibition titled Ozark Mountain Sketches by Members of the Palette and Chisel Club was held at the Brush and Pencil Club in St. Louis in 1913, predating the Society's formal founding and reflected the existing connections among the painters. Following the Society's founding, Krafft and Ingerle exhibited Ozark work at the Palette and Chisel Academy of Fine Art in Chicago in 1914, with a show of sixty paintings, of which twenty-five were sold. The Society held further exhibitions at the McCaughen-Burr Galleries in St. Louis in 1915.

Krafft served as the Society's first president in 1915. That year, his work was also featured in the Panama-Pacific International Exposition in San Francisco. Krafft also won the Englewood Prize in 1915 at the Art Institute of Chicago for Ozark Zephyrs and the Municipal Art League Purchase Prize in 1916 for Charms of the Ozarks, both Ozark paintings produced during his active association with the Society. His Ozark landscapes were described by the Fine Arts Journal as earning him the title "painter poet of the Ozarks."

== Members and associated artists ==
The Society's core founding membership reflected a cross-city network of painters united by the Palette and Chisel Academy of Fine Art and shared painting excursions.

=== Founding members ===
- Carl R. Krafft (Chicago) — landscape painter; founder of the Oak Park Art League; work held in the Art Institute of Chicago and Union League Club of Chicago
- Rudolph F. Ingerle (Chicago) — landscape painter; later known as the "Painter of the Smokies"; president of the Chicago Society of Artists
- Frank Nuderscher (St. Louis) — described by art historian William H. Gerdts as "the most significant Impressionist painter to spend his whole career in Missouri"; work held in the Saint Louis Art Museum, Missouri History Museum, and Missouri Governor's Mansion
- Oscar E. Berninghaus (St. Louis) — later a founding member of the Taos Society of Artists; work held in major museum collections nationally
- Carl Gustave Waldeck (St. Louis) — portrait painter; subject of Robert Henri's first large-scale portrait (1896); work held in the Saint Louis Art Museum

=== Associated artists ===
- August Petrtyl (Chicago) — participated in Ozark painting excursions with Krafft and Ingerle as a studio colleague at the Harvester Building in Chicago; painter, muralist, and illustrator

== Significance ==
The Society of Ozark Painters was part of a broader movement of American regional art colonies in the early 20th century, including the Taos Society of Artists in New Mexico and the Indiana School of Painting in Brown County, Indiana. Like those organizations, it brought artists together around a specific landscape, fostering a shared visual vocabulary while allowing individual artistic styles to develop independently.

The Ozark work produced by the Society's members entered significant public collections. Nuderscher's Ozark landscapes are held by the Saint Louis Art Museum, the Missouri History Museum, the Missouri Governor's Mansion, the Museum of Art and Archaeology at the University of Missouri, and the Arkansas Arts Center, among others. Krafft's Ozark paintings are represented in the Art Institute of Chicago and the Union League Club of Chicago collections.

Nuderscher later founded the Ozark School of Art in Arcadia, Missouri, extending the Society's educational legacy into a formal institutional setting.
