= Rudolph F. Ingerle =

American painter (1879–1950)

- Born: Rudolph Frank Ingerle; April 14, 1879; Vienna, Austria
- Died: October 20, 1950 (aged 71)
- Education: School of the Art Institute of Chicago
- Occupation: Landscape artist
- Spouse: Marie Vasut (m. 1904)

Rudolph Frank Ingerle (April 14, 1879 – October 20, 1950) was an American landscape artist of European origin, associated with the Chicago, Illinois art community during the early 20th century. He is known for his paintings of the Ozark Mountains and the Great Smoky Mountains, and was a prominent figure in Chicago's regional art world during the 1920s and 1930s. His landscapes of the Great Smoky Mountains earned him the appellation "Painter of the Smokies," and he was instrumental in the campaign that led to the establishment of the Great Smoky Mountains National Park in 1934.

== Early life and education ==
Ingerle was born on April 14, 1879, in Vienna, Austria, the son of Moravian parents. As a child he frequently visited his grandparents in their small mountain village, now part of the Czech Republic. When Ingerle was twelve years old, his family emigrated to the United States, initially settling in Burlington, Wisconsin, before relocating around 1891 to Chicago, where he was naturalized in 1895.

Ingerle initially trained for a career in music before turning to art. In Chicago, he studied at the John Francis Smith Art Academy, took evening classes at the School of the Art Institute of Chicago, and studied privately with painter Walter Dean Goldbeck. Childhood memories of the mountain landscape of his grandparents' home later inspired him to seek similar settings across the American Midwest in his painting career. He also studied and sketched works in the Art Institute's museum collection, later advocating such careful observation as the best approach to becoming a painter.

== Career ==
=== Early career and Chicago studio ===
Early in his career, Ingerle shared a joint commercial art studio in the Harvester Building at 606 S. Michigan Avenue in Chicago with fellow painters Carl R. Krafft and August Petrtyl, who operated a commercial venture called the Publicity Art Shop from the same address. All three were members of the Palette and Chisel Club, a prominent Chicago artists' organization. They also participated in painting excursions that included trips to the Ozark Mountains in Missouri. Ingerle and Krafft, along with St. Louis-based artists Frank Nuderscher, Oscar E. Berninghaus, and Carl Gustave Waldeck, co-founded the Society of Ozark Painters in 1914.

As a member of the Palette and Chisel, Ingerle was among the first Chicago artists to paint in rural Brown County, Indiana, beginning in 1908. That year he made his debut at the Art Institute of Chicago's annual exhibition for Chicago artists, where he would show almost every year until the mid-1940s. He allied himself with Indiana artist T.C. Steele and others in forming the Indiana School of Painting in Brown County, and subsequently left that association to co-found the Society of Ozark Painters.

=== The Ozarks ===
Ingerle first visited the Ozark Mountains in 1913 in search of new subjects and eventually moved to live and work there, co-founding the Society of Ozark Painters the following year. Inspired by the region's distinctive light and topography, Ingerle practiced his individual artistic style in decorative, romantic landscape paintings of the area.

=== The Great Smoky Mountains ===
In 1926, Ingerle made his first visit to the Great Smoky Mountains of western North Carolina and eastern Tennessee, and spend subsequent summers painting there. His landscapes of the area and character studies of mountain life earned him the title of "Painter of the Smokies." He exhibited his Smoky Mountain paintings more than 30 times at the Art Institute of Chicago. He was also given several one-man shows at prominent museums in the region, including the Mint Museum in Charlotte, North Carolina and the Hickory Museum of Art in western North Carolina.

A critic for the Chicago Tribune wrote of his work: "Rudolph F. Ingerle has won an enviable reputation as a landscape painter. In recent years he has done a great deal of painting in North Carolina. His superb mountain landscapes have captured the imagination and heart of an enormous public."

Ingerle witnessed firsthand the logging of virgin forests in the region and became an advocate for their protection. In the 1920s and early 1930s, he campaigned alongside travel writers, nature photographers, and local citizens to establish federal protection for the area. The Great Smoky Mountains National Park was established in 1934, due in part to the efforts of Ingerle and other artists.

=== Chicago art organizations ===
In 1922, Ingerle settled in Highland Park, Illinois, living on Laurel Avenue, where he remained the rest of his life. He was active in the Highland Park community, serving on the Highland Park Public Library Board of Trustees in the late 1930s and early 1940s. In 1931, he was commissioned to paint "Moonlight on Lake Michigan" (oil on canvas, 74" x 102") for the new Highland Park Public Library building, where it remains permanently installed.

Ingerle also maintained a studio in Chicago and served as president of the influential Chicago Society of Artists for two years. In 1924, he was a founding member of the North Shore Art League, serving as its first acting president. He was a member of the Association of Chicago Painters and Sculptors, which awarded him a gold medal in 1928 and another prize in 1938. He was awarded a Logan medal for Sanity in Art in 1938 by the Society for Sanity in Art.

In 1933, the Westinghouse Corporation commissioned Ingerle to create paintings for the Chicago Century of Progress, including "Fountain and Searchlights, a composition depicting the fair's electric fountain displays.

== Death ==
Ingerle died on October 20, 1950, in Highland Park, Illinois, at the age of 71. He had married Marie Vasut in 1904 and had at least one son.

== Recognition and collections ==
Ingerle received numerous awards throughout his career, including:

- Gold medal, Bohemian Art Club of Chicago, 1920
- Gold medal, Chicago Galleries Association, 1928
- Gold medal, Association of Chicago Painters and Sculptors, 1928
- Logan Medal of the Arts, Society for Sanity in Art, 1938

The Art Institute of Chicago patrons' group Friends of American Art purchased his painting "Swappin' Grounds" in 1928 for the museum's permanent collection, and the Art Institute gave him a solo exhibition in 1930.

His work is held in the collections of the Art Institute of Chicago, the Union League Club of Chicago, and the Illinois State Museum, Springfield, among other institutions.

== Selected works ==
- The Passing Show (1925) — McClung Museum of Natural History and Culture, Knoxville, Tennessee
- Swappin' Grounds (1928) — Art Institute of Chicago permanent collection; purchased by Friends of American Art
- Moonlight on Lake Michigan (1931) — Highland Park Public Library, Highland Park, Illinois
- Fountain and Searchlights (1933) — commissioned by Westinghouse Corporation for the Chicago Century of Progress

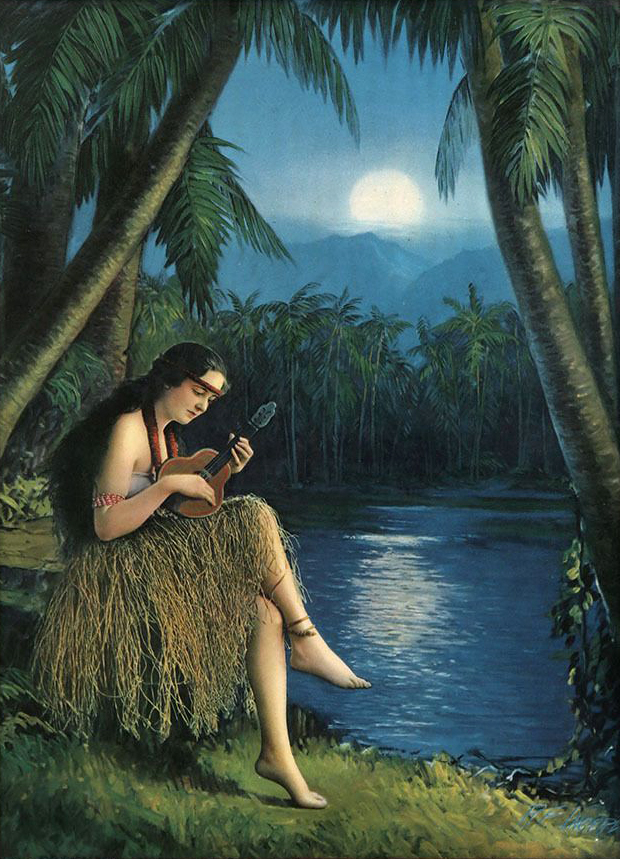
1923, Hawaiian Medolies by Rudolph F. Ingerle
