= Arcadia College =

- Ursuline Academy-Arcadia College Historic District
- U.S. National Register of Historic Places
- U.S. Historic district
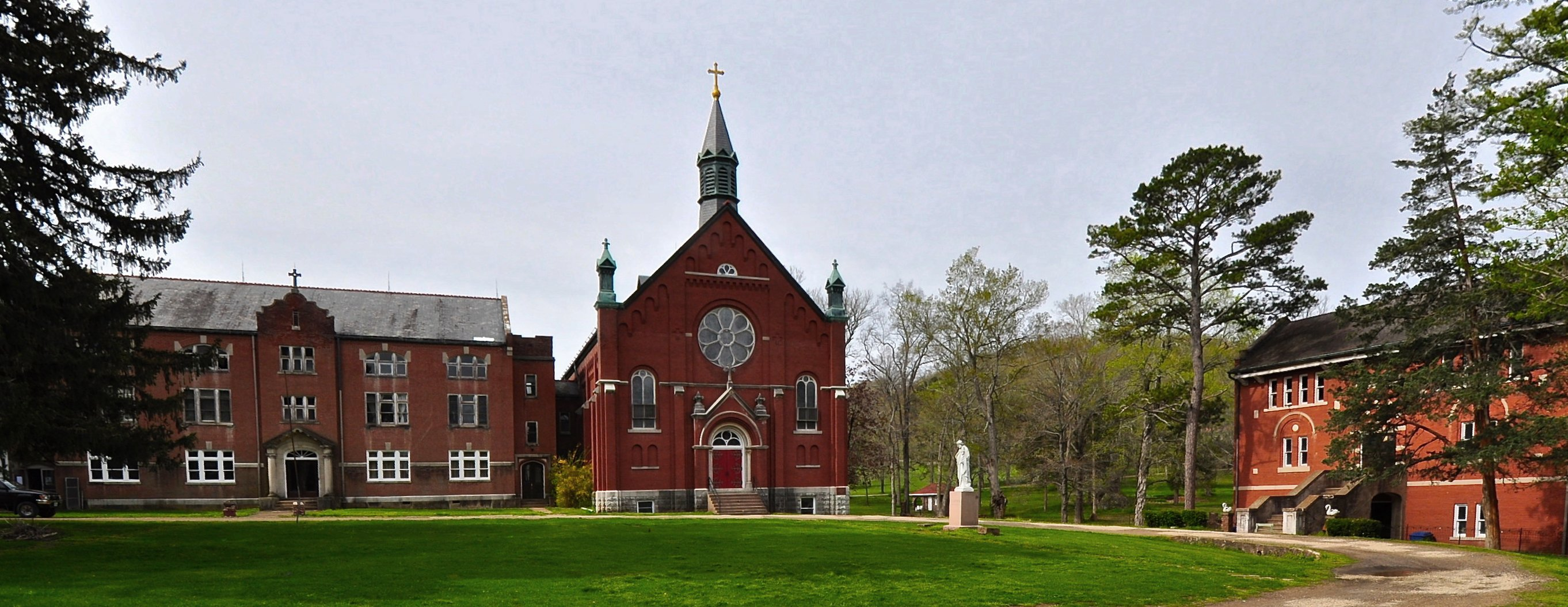
- Ursuline Academy-Arcadia College Historic District, September 2014

- Location within Missouri Location within the United States
- Location: Jct. of Maine and Maple Sts., Arcadia, Missouri
- Coordinates: 37°35′02″N 90°37′45″W
- Area: 25 acres (10 ha)
- Architect: Imbs, Thomas F.; Buckey, George A.
- Architectural style: Romanesque, Tudor Revival
- NRHP reference No.: 98000816
- Added to NRHP: July 1, 1998

Arcadia College, located in Arcadia, Missouri, United States, was founded by Rev. J.C. Berryman in 1843. The institution was associated with the Methodist Episcopal Church. Berryman then sold the institution in 1858 and it closed in 1861. The buildings were used as hospital for Union soldiers before reverting to Berryman in 1863. He returned for a few years and tried to restart the institution. The college then went through several owners and a four-story brick building was erected in 1870. Arcadia College closed in 1877. The building was acquired by Order of the Ursulines for Ursuline Academy/College. The school closed in 1971. The Lewis Lecture Series at Texas A&M is named for a former chair of A&M's English Department who served as president of Arcadia from 1870 to 1873. The Nostalgic Place Bed & Breakfast operates on the former campus

== Historic district ==
Ursuline Academy-Arcadia College Historic District is a national historic district listed on the National Register of Historic Places in 1998. The district encompasses nine contributing buildings, four contributing structures, and one contributing object associated with Arcadia College. It developed between about 1889 and 1948 and includes representative examples of Romanesque Revival and Tudor Revival style architecture. They include a large brick chapel (1909); three-story, T-shaped administration building (1918); four-story classroom and dining hall (1914); three-story nun's house (1922); a large two-story priest residence (c. 1902); three-story brick laundry building (1889); carriage shed (1907); gymnasium (1930); spring house (1910); and stone grotto, stone bridge, and gateposts.
