= John Carl Doemling =

American painter

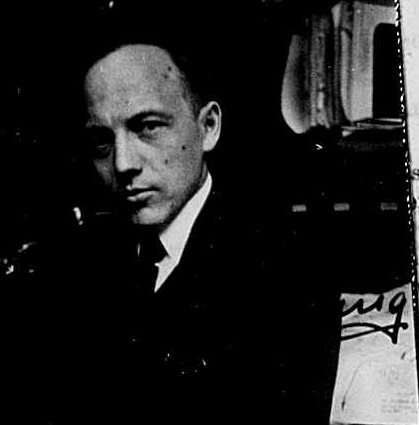
- 1924 Passport Picture of Artist John Carl Doemling
- Born: June 23, 1894; Sulzfeld, Rhön-Grabfeld, Bavaria, Germany
- Died: November 18, 1955 (aged 61); Chicago, Cook County, IL, USA
- Citizenship: Germany, United States
- Occupations: Artist, Designer

John Carl Doemling (1894–1955), artist, the son of Würzburg college professor Leonard Doemling and Johanna Herrmann, was born in Sulzfeld, Rhön-Grabfeld, Bavaria, Germany. Known throughout his life as "Carl", he spent his early years in a seminary preparing to become a priest; however, by age twelve he had opted to pursue an art career instead. He studied art in Würzburg, left home in his teens and supported himself by restoring paintings in churches and monasteries in Italy, Switzerland and France.

In 1911, John Carl immigrated to the U.S. to avoid mandatory military service in Kaiser Wilhelm II's army. He journeyed promptly to Chicago, Illinois to live with his uncle Gustav Doemling and family in the historic Pullman district. His uncle, Gustav, as general foreman in the Cabinet Department for the Pullman Palace Car Company, got Carl a job as a letterer. Carl eventually became a draftsman and designer.

While working, Carl studied at the Art Institute of Chicago along with Walt Disney. He also was a member of the Palette and Chisel Academy of Fine Art. Josephine Herrmann Boigegrain wrote in her biography: "One of his fellow students at the Chicago Art Institute was a young man by the name of Walt Disney. Disney had fantastic, revolutionary ideas about doing animated artwork, pictures that moved and told a story. He proposed to Carl Doemling that they go in together on the idea. Carl thought Disney was crazy. He did not accept. He later learned how wrong he had been."

In 1919, Carl had his first solo exhibit with the Palette and Chisel Club. He displayed thirty five paintings ranging from $15 to $400 in price. During the 1920s he made many trips to art colonies throughout the U.S. including Los Angeles and Laguna Beach. He would have numerous exhibits throughout the U.S. during his career. In 1926, he married a fellow artist, Veorlean Erauw, from California. A year later, they made plans to take up permanent residence in Laguna Beach where they both were active with the local art association, but instead moved back to downtown Chicago where he continued his work. During WWII, Carl worked at the Bendix Corporation - Aviation Dept in South Bend Indiana. Carl was known among artists to have painted in Brown County, Indiana and like many Chicago painters, rented a cabin and spent summers there. His paintings are still sought after today and displayed in numerous galleries.

== External sources ==
- "For The Love Of Family" by Mary Lois Doemling Michielsen (2003)
- "John" Doemling, Death Certificate No. 81824, 18 November 1955, State of Illinois, Dept.of Public Health
- Edan Milton Hughes, Artists in California, 1786–1940
- 2003/2004 Davenport's Art Reference & Price Guide
- Biography of Josephine Herrmann Boigegrain
- 1920, 1930 U.S. Census, Cook County, Chicago, IL.
- www.askart.com/Biography.asp
- www.illinoisart.org/artists_list.html
- www.paletteandchisel.org
