= Benjamin Blessum =

American painter (1877–1954)

Benjamin Blessum (November 4, 1877 – October 4, 1954) was an American painter, graphic artist and illustrator. He was primarily known for his Norwegian landscapes.

Travel poster designed by Ben Blessum, 1930

== Background ==
Ben Blessum was born in Marstein in Romsdalen, Norway. He was the son of shoemaker Johan Blessum and Marit Trøen from Vaage Municipality in Gudbrandsdal. His family emigrated from Trondheim in 1888 to Menominee, Wisconsin when he was 11 years old. He also lived in Eau Claire, Wisconsin, where his father worked in the lumber mills. In 1896, he moved to Chicago, Illinois, where he attended the Art Institute of Chicago, worked as a commercial artist and for the Chicago Tribune as an illustrator, and was involved in the temperance movement.

== Career ==
In 1905, Blessum was selected to design and illustrate a publication marking the coronation of Haakon VII of Norway. In 1913, he was commissioned to design and execute a painting to celebrate the 100th anniversary of the Norwegian Constitution. He painted The Departure of the Restauration now located at the Norwegian Emigrant Museum in Hamar. In 1916, he lived in Santa Fe, New Mexico, painting for the Santa Fe Railroad. During World War I, Blessum served as a representative to the American Committee on Public Information in Norway and acted in the same capacity for the United States War Department.

Blessum was a member of the Chicago Norske Klub and Palette and Chisel Academy of Fine Art both in Chicago. Blessum exhibited at the Art Institute of Chicago. Exhibitions of his works were held at the Chicago Norske Klub Annual Art Exhibit and the Norse-American Centennial Art Exhibition at the Minnesota State Fair.

From 1923 to 1936, he was the representative for the Norwegian State Railways in New York. Blessum received the Royal Norwegian Order of St. Olav, First Class, bestowed by King Haakon VII of Norway in recognition of his many services to the nation. He served as secretary of the Norwegian National League for over 50 years.

== Personal life ==
Blessum settled in Chicago with his wife, Karen Olsen, whom he married in 1900, and their children, Norman and Dagny. He retired in 1936 and built a home outside of Chicago. Blessum died at Lake Villa, Illinois, at the age of 77.

== Selected works ==
- Smaa diamanter: udvalgte fortællinger (1899) (in Norwegian)
- What You Can See from the Train in Norway (1930)
- Vikingland Vacations Norway (1930)

== Other sources ==
- Erickson, Rolf H. (1988) Ben Blessum, Norwegian-American Artist (The Sons of Norway Viking, 85, 10: 408-410)
- Haugan, Reidar Rye (1933) Prominent Artists and Exhibits of Their Work in Chicago (Chicago Norske Klub. Nordmanns-Forbundet, 24: 371—374, Volume 7)
