= Nicola Veronica =

Italian-American portraitist and engraver

Nicola Veronica (August 15, 1905 – September 1979) was an Italian-American portrait artist, photograph engraver for The Chicago Tribune newspaper, and art instructor at Palette and Chisel Academy of Fine Art in Chicago, Illinois. He was born as Nicholas Antonio Veronico, but later Americanized his name when he immigrated from Italy to America, arriving at Ellis Island, New York in about 1920.

== Artistic awards ==
Nicola Veronica won numerous art awards during his lifetime, including:

The Palette and Chisel Academy of Fine Art Gold Medal Award for the years 1943 and 1974:

1943: The watercolor painting of the Goldenrod (showboat).

1974: The watercolor painting of "Mother".

The Palette and Chisel Academy of Fine Art Gold Star Award in 1943 for the watercolor painting of the Goldenrod (showboat). From 1917 to 1969, only ten artists had been awarded that honor.
