= Frank Nuderscher =

American painter

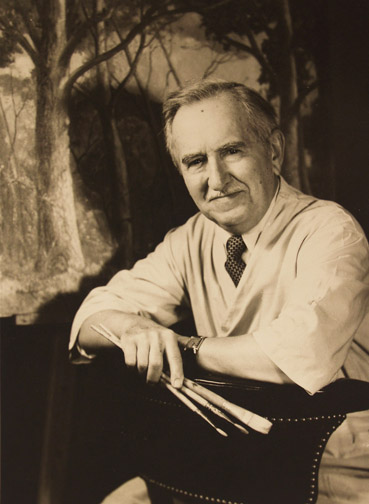
- Nuderscher in his St. Louis studio
- Born: Frank Bernard Nuderscher; 19 July 1880; St. Louis, MO
- Died: 7 October 1959 (aged 79); Clayton, MO
- Known for: Painting
- Movement: Impressionism, Tonalism

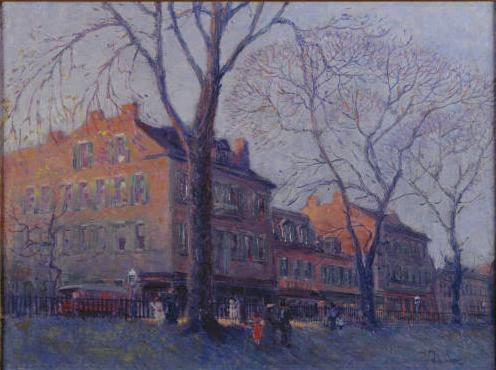
Lafayette Park Scene, 1916, in the Missouri History Museum collection

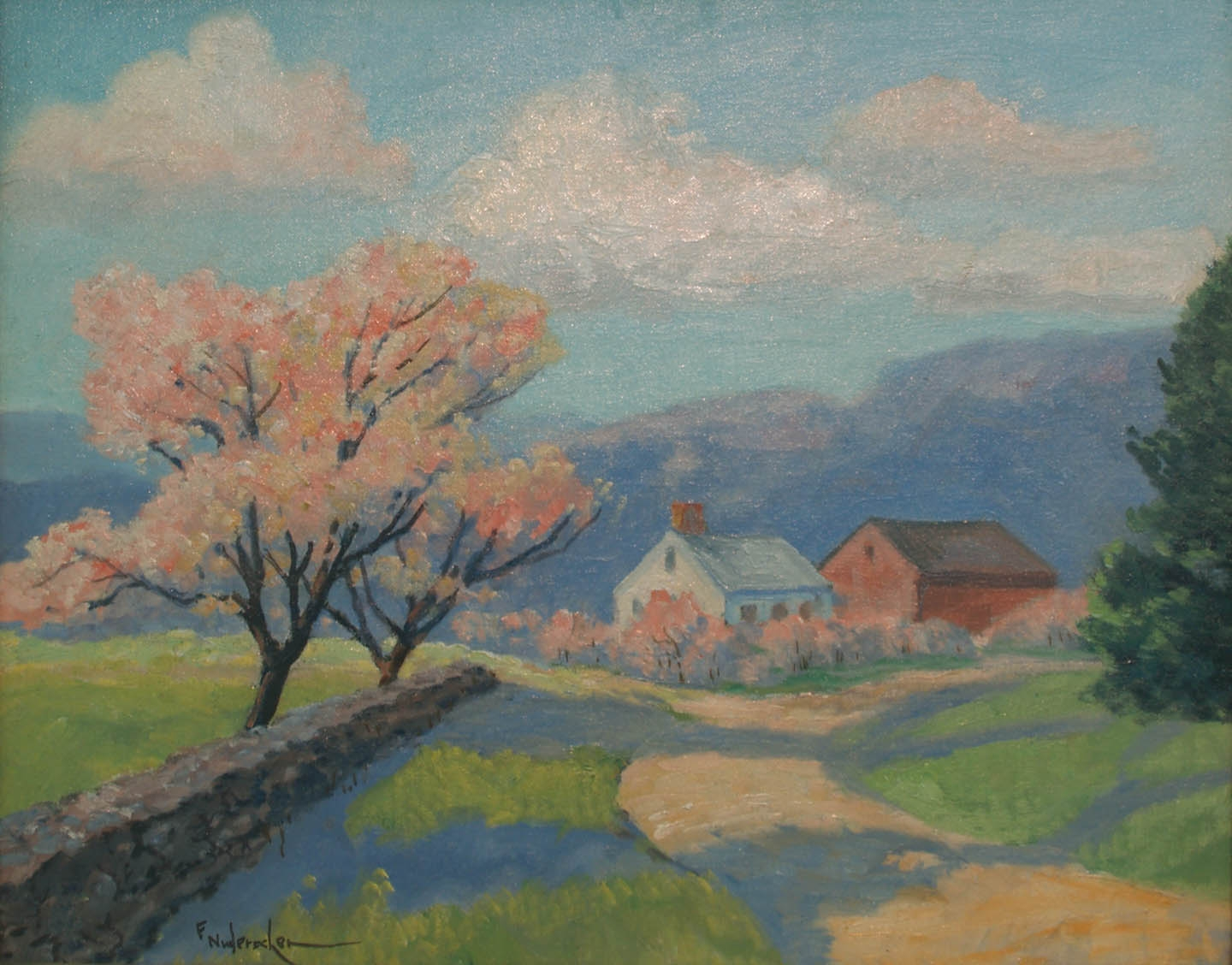
Spring Landscape, 1922, in the St. Louis Mercantile Library collection

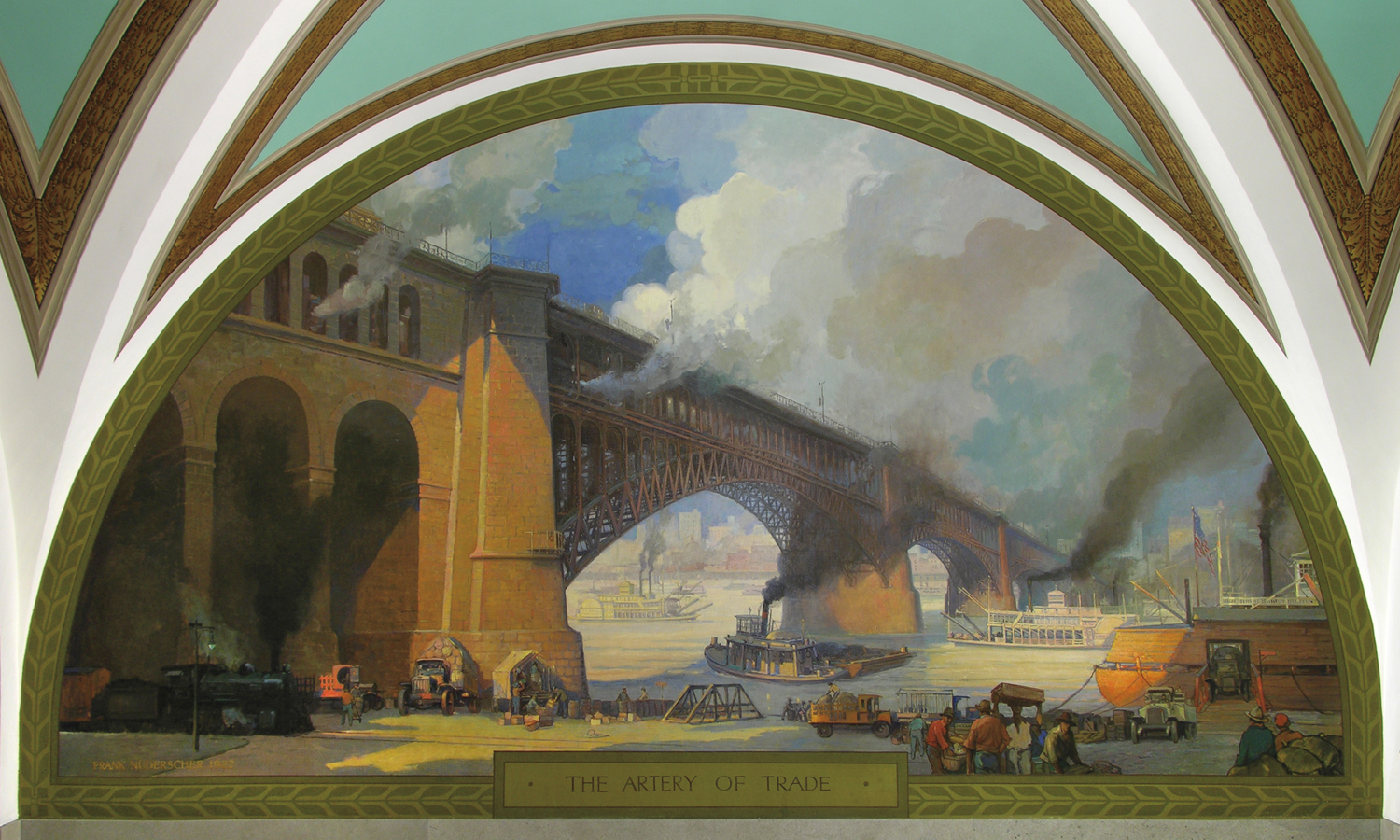
The Artery of Trade, 1922, in the Missouri State Capitol Nocturn, circa 1915-1920, in the St. Louis Mercantile Library collection

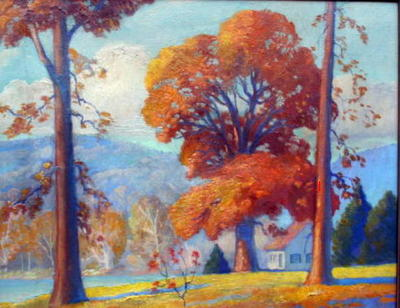
Ozark Landscape, 1920

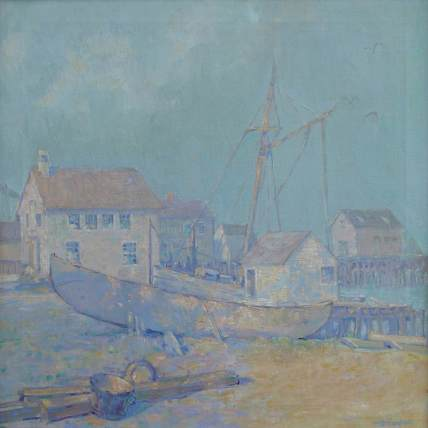
Mist and Sunshine (Provincetown), 1921

Frank Bernard Nuderscher (July 19, 1880 – October 7, 1959) was an American illustrator, muralist, and painter of the American Impressionism style. He was called the "dean of St. Louis artists" for his leadership in the Missouri art community.

== Background and training ==
Nuderscher was born in St. Louis, the son of a successful building contractor. His father wanted him to join the family business, but Nuderscher always had an interest in art. Legend has it that Nuderscher finally convinced his father to support his aspirations when at age 12 he earned two dollars sketching a bas-relief for a stonemason, therefore convincing his father that he could earn a living as an artist.

Nuderscher is frequently credited for being self-taught as an artist. However, it was reported that he took art classes in New York, Philadelphia, and Provincetown, that he studied art while traveling in Europe, and that he was enrolled at the St. Louis School of Fine Arts at Washington University in St. Louis.

In 1904, Nuderscher first attracted the attention of the fine arts community with his painting of the Eads Bridge which won first prize in the Artist's Guild Competition. With artists from all over the world in St. Louis for the 1904 World's Fair, it was a particularly competitive field. W.K. Bixby, a nationally recognized art patron and philanthropist, purchased the work for his own collection and encouraged the young artist. The Eads Bridge would become a repeated theme for Nuderscher and his future Granite Building studio at Fourth and Market Streets in downtown St. Louis would look out over the iconic structure.

== Work ==
=== Illustrations ===
Early is his career, Nuderscher did more illustration work than he did later in his career when his reputation as a painter allowed him to focus primarily in the fine arts. As an illustrator, he created commercial advertisements, architectural drawings, book illustrations, and magazine covers. Succeeding Oscar E. Berninghaus, Nuderscher created the designs and drawings for the floats in the Veiled Prophet Parade between 1945 and 1954.

=== Paintings ===
Nuderscher's early oil paintings reflected the vibrant urban atmosphere of St. Louis in the first half of the 20th century. Nuderscher captured industrial scenes, streetscapes, and monuments of urban progress such as the Eads Bridge. Nuderscher painted structures without sharply defined outlines and his tonalistic style conveyed the smoky air, filtered sun, and misty haze of the industrial city.

Sometime after 1910, Nuderscher discovered that his ability to paint the subtleties of the urban atmosphere lent itself to depicting the hazy air, fog, and light that was characteristic of the hills and valleys of the Ozark Mountains. His Ozark landscapes became his most characteristic work and were easily recognized by their peaceful serenity and by their muted, often pastel, colors. Nuderscher so loved painting in the Ozarks that he purchased a house in Arcadia, Missouri and moved his family there. The Nuderscher family spent most of the 1920s in Arcadia, and Nuderscher even served as the village's mayor.

While Nuderscher may have become better known as a painter of Ozark landscapes, he did not abandon his earlier urban themes. He continued to paint both urban St. Louis and the rural Arcadian Valley and saw no conflict in exhibiting them together.

Nuderscher paintings are in the collections of the Saint Louis Art Museum, Missouri History Museum, the Missouri Governor's Mansion, the National Park Service Museum of Westward Expansion, the Museum of Art and Archaeology at the University of Missouri, the St. Louis Mercantile Library at the University of Missouri - St. Louis, the Arkansas Arts Center, and the Saint Louis University Museum of Art.

=== Murals ===
By the early 1920s, Nuderscher's reputation as a painter earned him high-profile mural projects such as the commission to paint a lunette in the Missouri State Capitol. He sketched a few different designs for the project before deciding on one of his favorite subjects, the Eads Bridge. Completed in 1922, The Artery of Trade (originally titled The Great Crossing) is a favorite of capitol visitors because of the optical illusion of the bridge moving as the viewer walks past.

Nuderscher painted murals all over the United States including in New York City, Atlanta, and San Francisco. He remained in high demand as a muralist, particularly in Missouri, where he created works in banks, schools, museums, and in private place mansions. Notable commissions included murals in the Missouri Building at the 1939 New York World's Fair, the Missouri Pacific Museum, the Saint Louis Zoo, and St. Louis City Hospital.

In 1955, one of Nuderscher's murals made national headlines with regard to the Civil Rights Movement. His mural, The Apotheosis of St. Louis, that adorned the St. Louis Board of Education assembly room had featured only white children. In light of the controversy of racial integration in St. Louis public schools, Nuderscher volunteered to repaint two of the children in the mural to be African-American and thus integrate the mural in a symbolic act.

== Dean of St. Louis artists ==
According to art historian William H. Gerdts, Nuderscher "was the most significant Impressionist painter to spend his whole career in Missouri." In the Midwest, Nuderscher was appreciated as such in his lifetime, and he used his influence to mentor other artists and to promote the arts in the region.

Nuderscher was the last surviving artist of the Riverfront Art Colony in St. Louis. He was a member of the National Society of Mural Painters, the St. Louis Artist Guild (where he won 10 first prizes), was president of the Independent Artists of St. Louis, and was the state chairman of the American Artists Professional League. Nuderscher also co-founded the Society of Ozark Painters with Carl R. Krafft and Rudolph F. Ingerle of Chicago and fellow St. Louis artists Oscar E. Berninghaus and Carl Gustave Waldeck.

Nuderscher was the founder and director of the Nuderscher School of Art in St. Louis, the Ozark School of Art in Arcadia, and ran a summer school in Kimmswick, Missouri. In the 1930s, he was the area supervisor for the WPA Federal Arts Project in the St. Louis region. During his long tenure as a working artist and teacher, Nuderscher trained multiple generations of Missouri painters.

After a career of over 50 years, Nuderscher died of heart disease in his Clayton, Missouri home at age 79.
