= Let's Keep the Glow in Old Glory (And the Free in Freedom Too) =

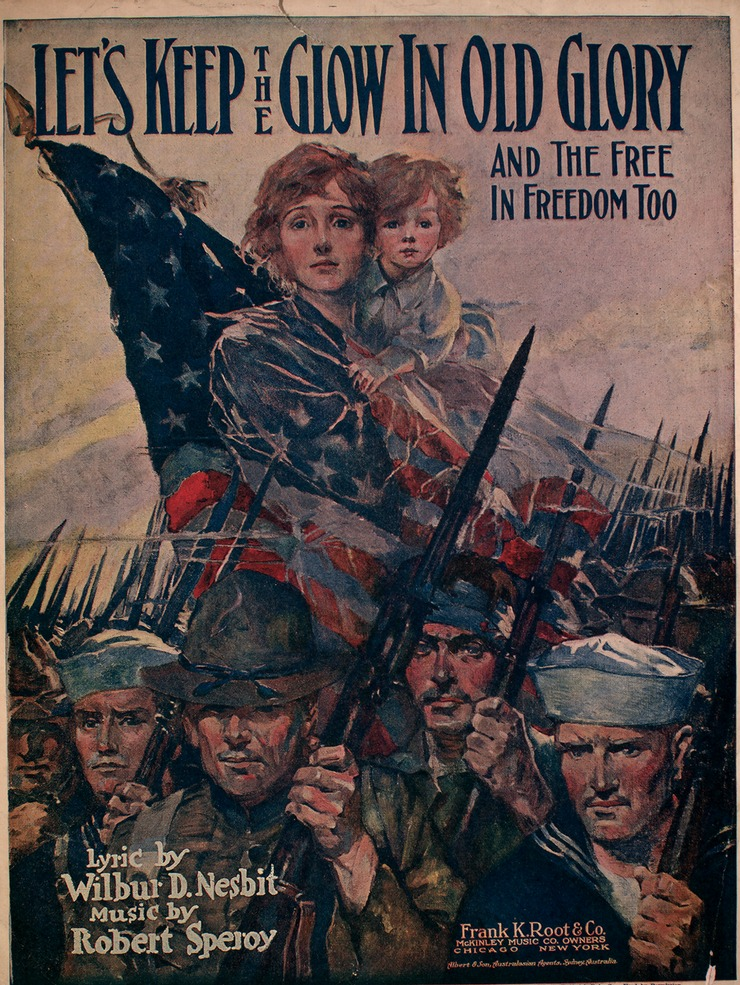
- Sheet music cover of "Let's Keep the Glow in Old Glory"

Song
- Released: 1918
- Songwriter(s): Composer: Robert Speroy; Lyricist: Wilbur D. Nesbit
- Producer(s): Frank K. Root & Co.

Let's Keep the Glow in Old Glory (And the Free in Freedom Too) is a World War I era song released in 1918. Wilbur D. Nesbit wrote the lyrics. Robert Speroy composed the music. The song was published by Frank K. Root & Co. of Chicago, Illinois. On the cover is a woman holding a child. Both are wrapped in the American flag. Below the two are soldiers from different branches of service, holding rifles. The song was written for both voice and piano. The tone of the song is patriotic, as evidenced in the chorus:

Let's keep the glow in Old Glory
Let's keep the flag floating high
Let's keep each star in the field of blue
As clear as the stars in the sky
Let's stand shoulder to shoulder
Let's keep our loyalty true
Let's keep the Glow in Old Glory
And the Free in Freedom too
