= Carl Gustave Waldeck =

American painter (1866–1930)

Carl Gustave Waldeck (March 13, 1866 - February 16, 1930) was an American painter based in St. Louis, Missouri, known primarily as a portrait painter and as a co-founder of the Society of Ozark Painters.

== Early life and training ==
Waldeck was born on March 13, 1966, in St. Charles, Missouri, near St. Louis. Showing early promise as an artist, he traveled to Paris in 1893 and studied at the Académie Julian and the Académie Colarossi, two of the leading private art academies of the period. During his time in Paris he received awards for his work, and in 1896 his paintings were exhibited at the Paris Salon. He was also named an officer of the French Academy, one of the highest honors available to artists of the period.

== Career ==
While in Paris, Waldeck became close friends with American painter Robert Henri, who painted a portrait of Waldeck in 1896, inscribing it à l'ami Waldeck ("to my friend, Waldeck"). The portrait is considered historically significant as Henri's first large-scale portrait work, predating his establishment as one of America's leading portrait painters by approximately five years. It was held in the collection of the St. Louis Art Museum from the 1970s until it was deaccessioned and donated to the Robert Henri Museum in Cozad, Nebraska, in 2021 by members of the Waldeck family.

After traveling through Europe, Waldeck returned to St. Louis, established a studio, and built a career as a portrait painter. He was a co-founder of the Society of Ozark Painters in 1914 alongside Carl R. Krafft and Rudolph F. Ingerle of Chicago and fellow St. Louis artists Frank Nuderscher and Oscar E. Berninghaus.

== Death and legacy ==
Waldeck died on February 16, 1930, in St. Louis, Missouri, at the age of 63. His work is held in the collection of the St. Louis Art Museum.
