= William Waller House =

Historic house in Illinois, United States

- U.S. National Register of Historic Places
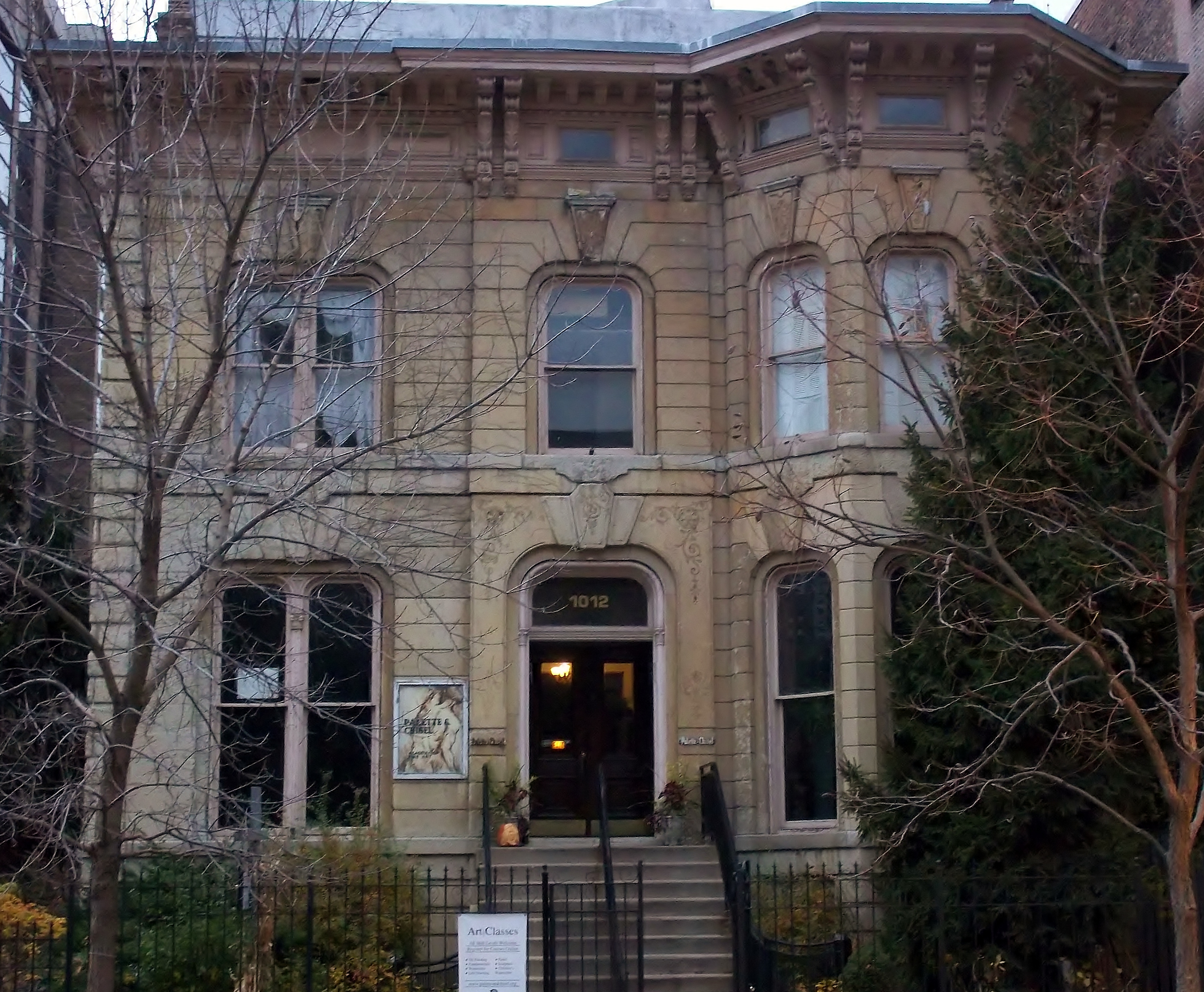

- Location within Chicago metropolitan area Location within Illinois Location within the United States
- Location: 1012 N. Dearborn St., Chicago, Illinois
- Coordinates: 41°54′3″N 87°37′49″W
- Area: less than one acre
- Built: 1875–76
- Architectural style: Italianate, Tuscan Villa
- NRHP reference No.: 80001346
- Added to NRHP: November 21, 1980

The William Waller House is a historic house located at 1012 N. Dearborn St. in the Near North Side neighborhood of Chicago, Illinois. The home was built in 1875–76, shortly after the Great Chicago Fire, during the development of Chicago's prosperous Gold Coast district.

The house's Italianate design features a stone exterior, a double bay front, a bracketed and ornamented cornice, arched windows, and decorative keystones. Though Italianate rowhouses are still common in the Near North Side, freestanding Italianate homes are relatively rare, and the Waller House is one of the best-preserved examples of these homes.

In 1921, the Palette and Chisel Academy of Fine Art purchased the house with the help of founding member, Fred Larson, who mortgaged his own home for this purpose. The house was added to the National Register of Historic Places on November 21, 1980.
