= Heřmaneč =

- Municipality
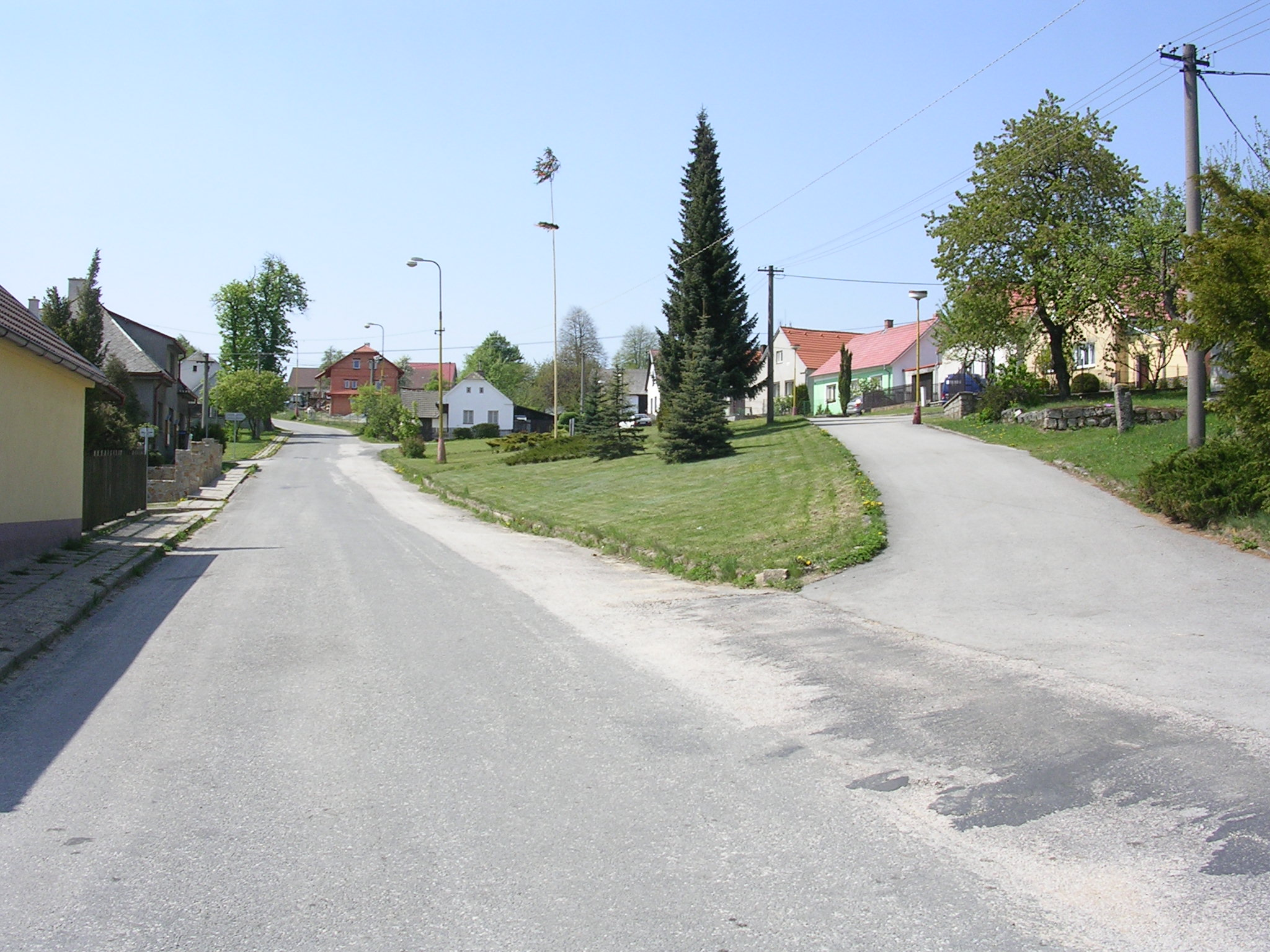
- Centre of Heřmaneč

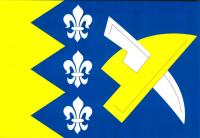
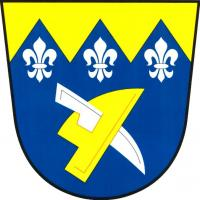
- Flag Coat of arms

- Location in the Czech Republic
- Coordinates: 49°7′46″N 15°17′7″E
- Country: Czech Republic
- Region: South Bohemian
- District: Jindřichův Hradec
- First mentioned: 1350

Area
  - Total: 5.10 km^{2} (1.97 sq mi)
- Elevation: 609 m (1,998 ft)

Population (2026-01-01)
  - Total: 97
  - Density: 19/km^{2} (49/sq mi)
- Time zone: UTC+1 (CET)
  - Summer (DST): UTC+2 (CEST)
- Postal code: 378 53
- Website: hermanec.cz

Heřmaneč is a municipality and village in Jindřichův Hradec District in the South Bohemian Region of the Czech Republic. It has about 100 inhabitants.

Heřmaneč lies approximately 21 kilometres (13 mi) east of Jindřichův Hradec, 62 km (39 mi) east of České Budějovice, and 124 km (77 mi) south-east of Prague.

== Demographics ==
Historical population
Year	Pop.	±%
1869	240	—
1880	237	−1.2%
1890	238	+0.4%
1900	231	−2.9%
1910	224	−3.0%
1921	222	−0.9%
1930	202	−9.0%
1950	154	−23.8%
1961	136	−11.7%
1970	118	−13.2%
1980	93	−21.2%
1991	96	+3.2%
2001	79	−17.7%
2011	94	+19.0%
2021	86	−8.5%
Source: Censuses
