= Marshall Monroe Kirkman =

American historian (1842–1921)

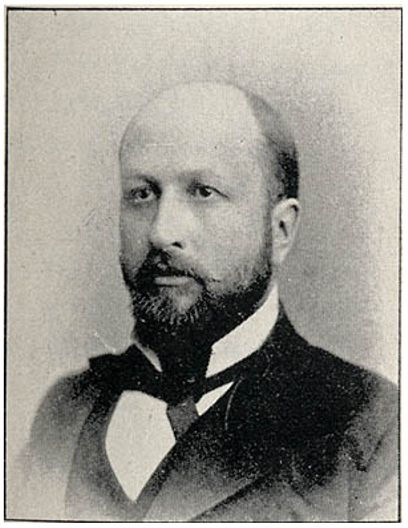
Marshall M. Kirkman

Marshall Monroe Kirkman (July 10, 1842 – April 17, 1921) was an American authority on railways, who wrote extensively on the subject of railways.

== Life and work ==
Born on the prairies in Morgan County, Illinois, Kirkman was raised far from any town or school and received private education and some years of common school. In 1856 at the age of fourteen he left home to seek his fortune. He made his way on foot to Fulton, Illinois, where the Chicago and North Western Railway had just been completed.

Kirkman entered the service of the Chicago and North Western Railway, where he got his first job as telegraph messenger. He soon learned telegraphy and was given charge of the office at DeKalb, Illinois, from which position he was transferred to the Train Dispatcher's office at Chicago, then located in the old Indiana Street Depot.

In 1861 he was appointed Auditor Freight Accounts, and in 1865, Assistant General Accountant. Two years later, he was appointed General Accountant, and in 1870 was also made Local Treasurer. From June 30, 1881, to November 1, 1889, he was Comptroller. As controller he was head of the Auditing Department of the Chicago and North Western Railway, supervising the Auditing departments of the Union Pacific, the Chicago and North Western, the Chicago, St. Paul and Minneapolis, and the Fremont, Elkhorn and Missouri Valley railways. In 1889 Kirkman was elected vice president, which position he filled until 1910, when he retired on a pension after 53 years of service at the Chicago and North Western Railway.

In 1881 he became resident of Evanston, Illinois. Kirkman wrote extensively on the subject of railways. He wrote a twelve volume treatise, The Science of Railways (1894), which was later revised and republished in 17 volumes, and 3 portfolios (1909, et. seq.). Kirman was also founding father of the Accounting Division of the Association of American Railroads.

== Selected publications ==
- The Baggage, Parcel and Mail Traffic of Railroads, 1881.
- The Handling of Railway Supplies: Their Purchase & Disposition, 1887.
- Railway Rates and Government Control: Economic Questions Surrounding These Subjects, 1892.
- Origin and Evolution of Transportation; Or, The Genesis of Railway Carriage, 1898.
- The Science of Railways, Editions 1903–04
  - Vol. 1, Railway equipment, 1903.
  - Vol. 2, Railway Organization, 1904.
  - Vol. 3, Financing, Constructing, & Maintaining, 1904.
  - Vol. 4, Train Service: ... Men & Equipment; Organization, 1904.
  - Vol. 5, Passenger, Baggage, Express & Mail Service, 1904.
  - Vol. 6, Freight Business & Affairs, 1904.
  - Vol. 7, Disturbances of railroads, 1903. (1904)
  - Vol. 8, Economic Theory of Rates, Private versus Government Control of Railroads, 1903. (1904)
  - Vol. 9, Fiscal Affairs - Collection of Revenue, 1904.
  - Vol 10, General Fiscal and Other Affairs, 1903.
  - Vol. 11, Origin and Evolution of Transportation, 1904 (first ed. 1898).
  - Vol. 12, Engineers and Firemen's manual, 1903.
  - Supplements:
    - Building and Repairing Railways, 1901
    - Westinghouse Air Brakes, Vol. 15, 1904.
    - How Oil is Used for Fuel on Locomotives, Vol. 16, 1902.
    - Supervision of cars, Vol. 19, 1904.
    - Telegraph and Telephone, Vol. 20, 1904.

Other works

- The Romance of Gilbert Holmes (1900)
- Iskander (1903)
- The Alexandrian Novels (three volumes, 1909)
- History of Alexander the Great (1913)
- The King: A Romance of the Camp and Court of Alexander the Great : the Story, (1913)
