= Wilbur D. Nesbit =

American poet

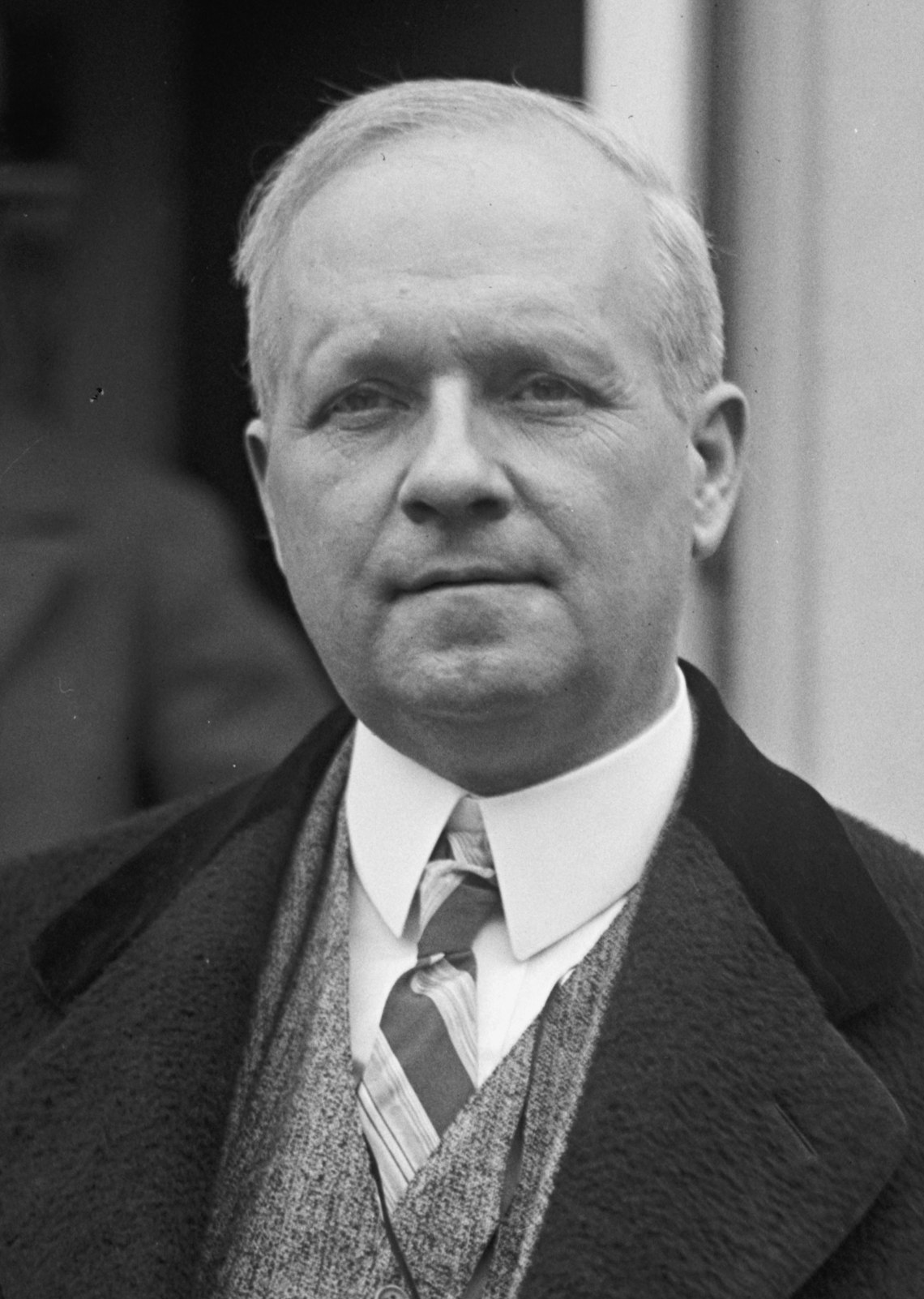
- Nesbit in 1925
- Born: September 16, 1871; Xenia, Ohio
- Died: August 20, 1927 (aged 55); Chicago, Illinois
- Occupations: Poet and humorist
- Writing career
- Pen name: Josh Wink
- Notable works: "Your Flag and My Flag"

Wilbur Dick Nesbit (1871–1927), also known by the pen name Josh Wink, was an American poet and humorist. He is most known for his poem, "Your Flag and My Flag", which was popular during World War I. Throughout his career, he contributed his humor writing to many publications, including the Chicago Inter Ocean, Chicago Evening Post, Chicago Tribune, and Baltimore News-American.

== Personal life ==
Nesbit was born on September 16, 1871 in Xenia, Ohio to John Harvey and Isabel (née Fichthrone) Nesbit. His father was an American Civil War veteran and worked as a court bailiff. Nesbit spent most of his early life in Cedarville, Ohio.

He associated with freemasonry for much of his life.

Nesbit died on August 20, 1927 in Iroquois Hospital after collapsing on Chicago streets.

== Career ==
Nesbit's first writings appeared in the Cedarville Herald. He started out as a printer before becoming a reporter, and moving to Anderson, Indiana in 1889. Here, Nesbit was an editor for the Anderson Times. He continued to move around to various cities, including Muncie, Indianapolis, and Baltimore. In Indianapolis, he worked in store advertising for a clothing merchant, and was on the ad staff for the Indianapolis Journal. During his time in Baltimore, Nesbit was a featured writer for the Baltimore News-American under the pen name, Josh Wink.

In 1902, Nesbit moved to Chicago. He wrote for the Chicago Tribune, where his column was titled, "A Line O' Type or Two." Besides writing for the Tribune, he was also on the staff for the Chicago Evening Post.

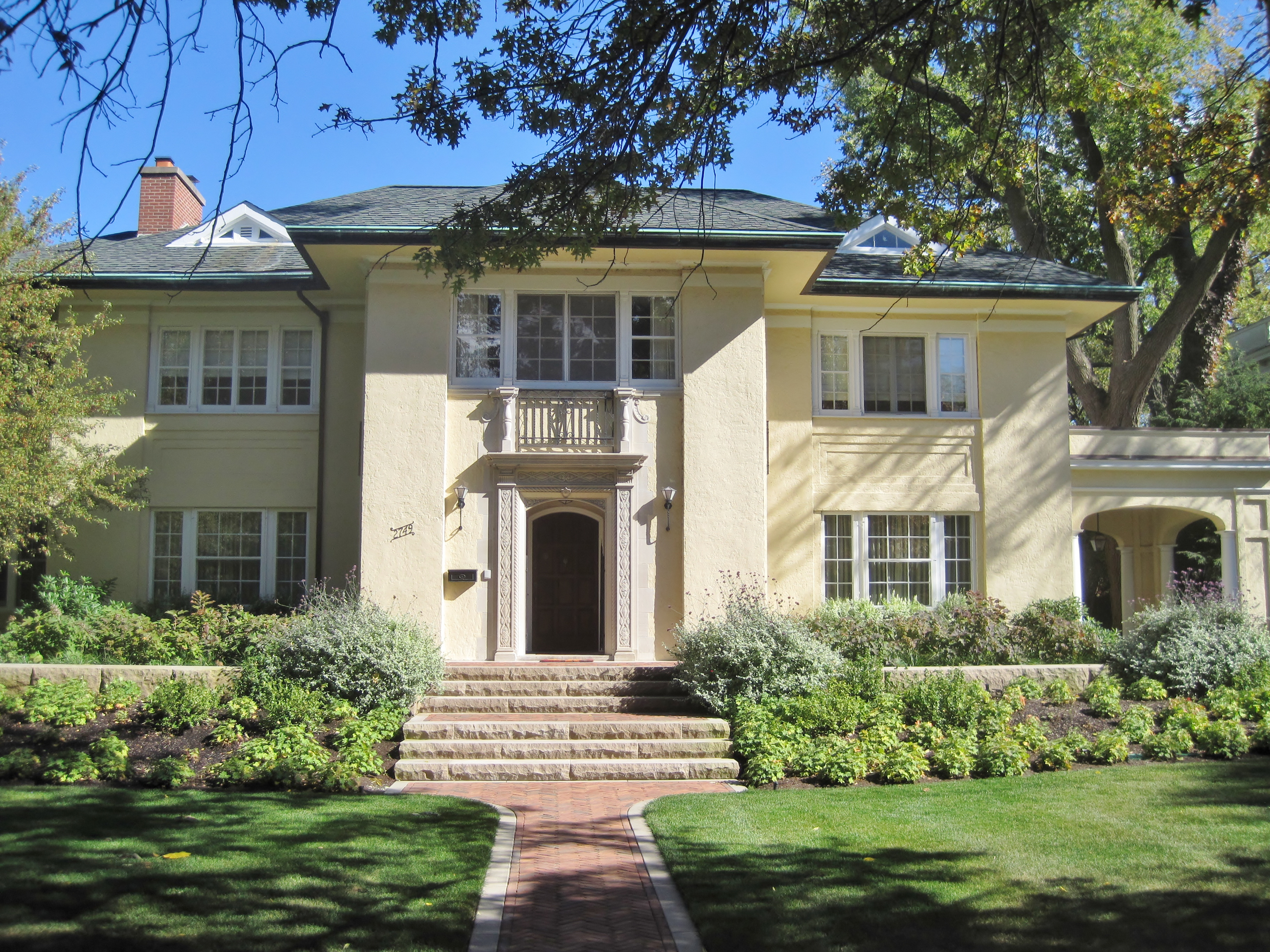
The Wilbur D. Nesbit House in the Evanston Northeast Historic District (1913). It is a local landmark.

In Chicago, Nesbit worked at the Mahin (also spelled Makin) Advertising Company. After some time, Nesbit, along with William H. Rankin and other associates, bought out the company. It was renamed William H. Rankin Company. Nesbit was vice president of the company and the director of the copy staff.

Nesbit collaborated with cartoonist Clare Briggs. With Otto Harbach he co-authored the book to the 1911 Broadway musical The Girl of My Dreams.

His most well-known work is the poem, "Your Flag and My Flag". It appeared in the Baltimore American in 1902, and became popular during World War I. It was often recited in school classrooms.

Much of his work was published by Chicago publishers P. F. Volland Company and Frank K. Root & Co.

He was the commencement speaker at the 1923 commencement ceremony at Cedarville University.

== Selected works ==
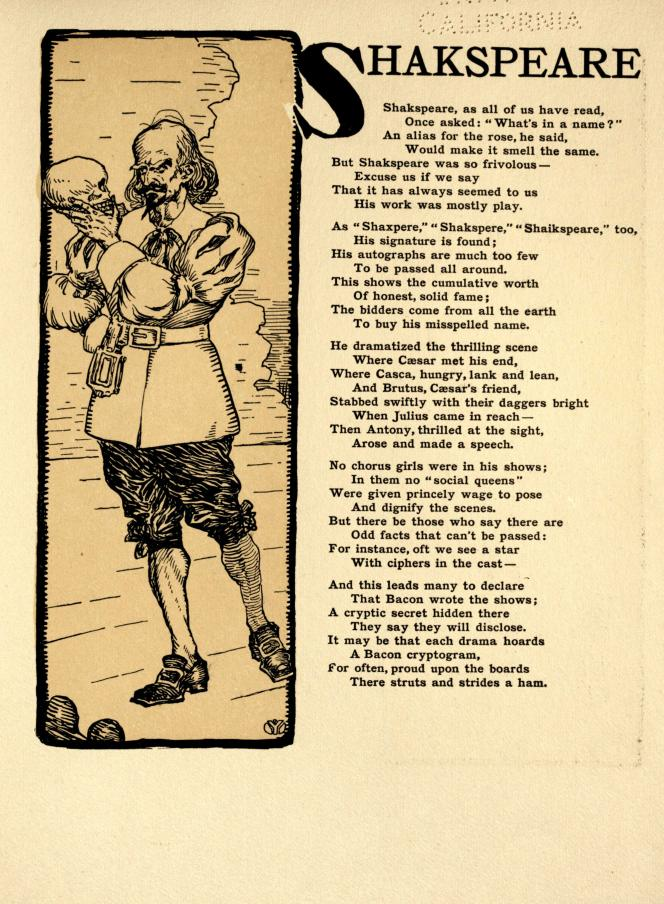
Page from Nesbit's Alphabet of History; Illustrated by Ellsworth Young

Books

- Just Because of You. 1925. P.F. Volland Co. OCLC 17868851, later re-published by Wise-Parslow Co. OCLC 17163027
- Paths Of Long Ago. 1926. Reilly And Lee.
- Sermons in Song. 1929. P.F. Volland Co. OCLC 289980.
- Sermons in Song: Poems of Homely Philosophy. 1929. P.F. Volland Co. OCLC 228693560.
- After Dinner Speeches and How to Make Them. 1927. Reilly & Lee. OCLC 1476993.
- When a Feller Needs a Friend. With Clare Briggs. 1914. P.F. Volland & Co. OCLC 2106009.
- A Friend or Two. 1910. P.F. Volland Co.. OCLC 573879
- An Alphabet of History. 1905. Paul Elder and Co. Publishers. OCLC 612996833.
- The Trail to Boyland and Other Poems. 1904. The Bobbs-Merrill Company Publishers. OCLC 3746568.

Song

- Let's Keep the Glow in Old Glory (And the Free in Freedom Too). 1918. Lyricist. Frank K. Root & Co.. OCLC 17851703.
