= Charles Berninghaus =

American painter

- Born: May 19, 1905
- Died: January 1, 1988 (aged 82); Taos, New Mexico, U.S.
- Resting place: Sierra Vista Cemetery, Taos, New Mexico, U.S.
- Education: Chicago Art Institute; Art Students League of New York
- Occupation: Painter
- Parent: Oscar E. Berninghaus

Julius Charles Berninghaus (May 19, 1905 – January 1, 1988) was an American painter from New Mexico.
