= William M. R. French =

American engineer (1843–1914)

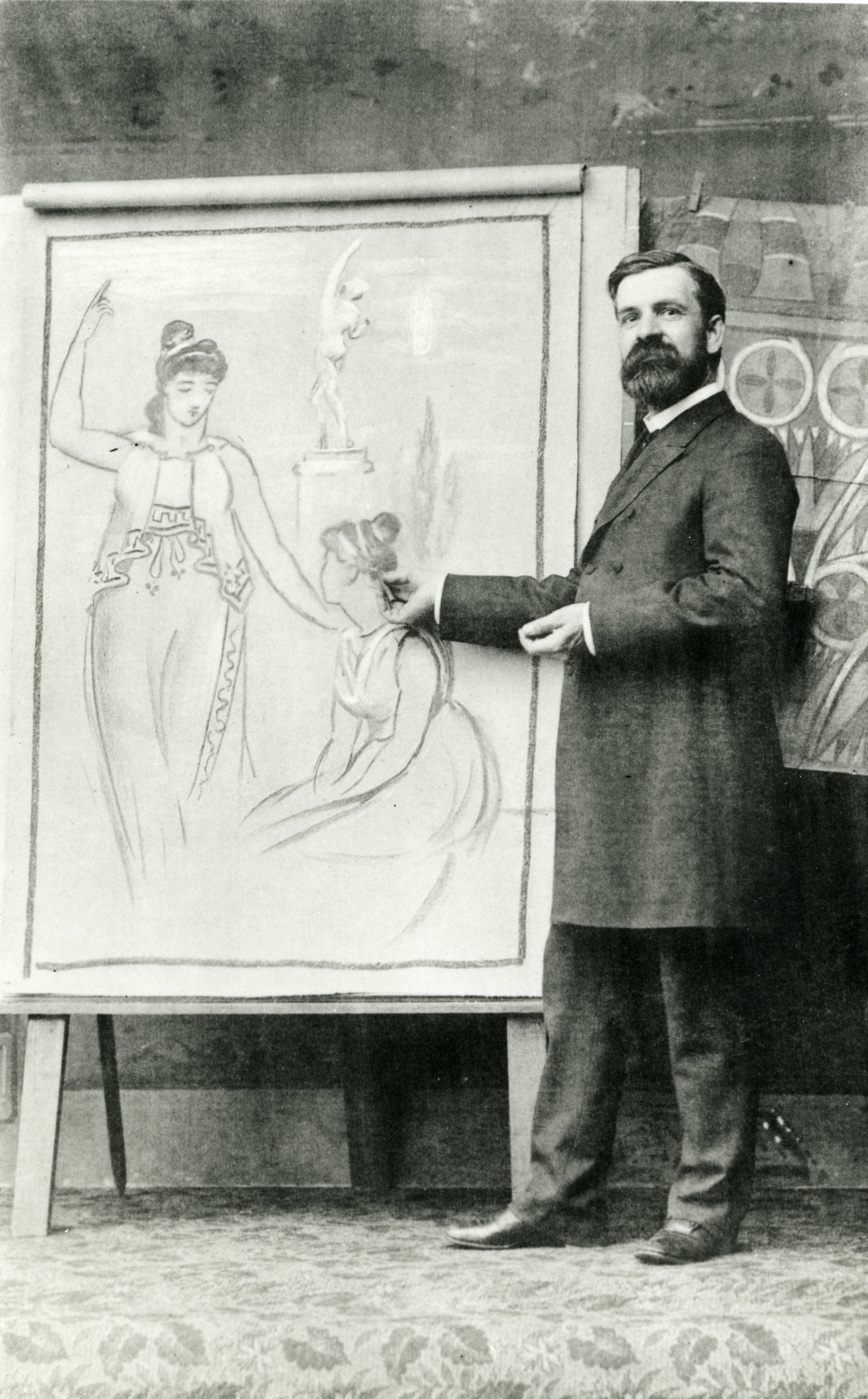
- Born: William Merchant Richardson French; October 1, 1843; Exeter, New Hampshire
- Died: June 3, 1914 (aged 70); Chicago, Illinois
- Education: Harvard & Phillips Exeter Academy

William Merchant Richardson French (1843–1914) was an American engineer. He first came to Chicago in 1867 to pursue a career in civil engineering and landscaping. During his time in Chicago, he gained a national reputation for his lectures and articles on art subjects. In 1878, he became Secretary of the Chicago Academy of Design, which was later reorganized as the Chicago Academy of Fine Arts in 1879. The academy changed its name to the Art Institute of Chicago in 1882. French became the secretary of this new corporation and its first director in 1885, a position he held until his death in 1914.

== Biography ==
=== Family ===
William French was born to Anne Richardson (1811–1856), the daughter of William M. Richardson (1774–1838), Chief Justice of New Hampshire, and Henry F. French (1813–1885). His siblings were Henriette Van Mater French Hollis (1839–1911), Sarah Flagg French Bartlett (1846–1883), and Daniel Chester French (1850–1931).

William French was born into a family of pure New England heritage. His earliest known ancestor in America, Edward French, arrived in New England in 1630, just ten years after the establishment of the Plymouth Colony. Both of his grandfathers fought in the American Revolution. His father, Henry Flagg French, was a lawyer, judge, and agricultural expert who went on to found the Massachusetts Agricultural College. Henry also excelled in farming, contributing to an early understanding of civil engineering practices. William's mother, Anne Richardson, was the daughter of William Merchant Richardson of Chester, New Hampshire, who served as Chief Justice of New Hampshire.

=== Early life and education ===
William, known as "Will" to his family, was described as "a handsome boy, with black hair and brown eyes. Quick-witted and energetic, he was a born student; he was among the first three or four in his class of forty. He was a very imaginative little boy, very resourceful, and had a mind that went like lightning. He was forever urging his little brother on to a new activity." The French family often spent winters in Washington, DC, with relatives and a month each summer at the family farm in Chester.

William was 13 when his mother died in 1853 after several years of illness. Three years later, on September 29, 1859, his father married Pamela Mellen Prentice. In 1860, the family moved to Cambridge, Massachusetts, where they lived next to Henry Wadsworth Longfellow. During a snowstorm in Cambridge, Will and his brother Dan sculpted a "mother lioness and her little cub." Mr. Longfellow, with a large group of observers present, expressed his admiration for the piece.

In 1860, William began his studies at Harvard University and graduated in 1864.

=== Marriages ===
On September 9, 1879, French married Sarah Moody Lovejoy of Princeton, Illinois. She died in 1881, leaving no children. Nine years later, in 1890, he married Alice Helm, the daughter of Henry Thomas Helm and Julia Lathrop Helm of Chicago, Illinois. They had two children: Henry Helm French (1891–1970) and Prentiss French (1894–1989).

=== Career ===
After the Chicago Fire destroyed his landscaping practice with H. W. S. Cleveland, French shifted his focus to the fine arts and began teaching at the Chicago Academy of Fine Arts.

In 1878, he became Secretary of the Chicago Academy of Design, which was reorganized as the Chicago Academy of Fine Arts in 1879 and later renamed the Art Institute of Chicago in 1882. With the name change to the Chicago Academy of Fine Arts, French's title changed from Secretary to Director, making him the first director of the Art Institute. He oversaw the daily operations of both the school and the museum, working closely with Board President Charles L. Hutchinson.

French's dedication to the Art Institute was so profound that, as a friend recalled, "he knew every stone in the structure, every collection in the galleries, and every servant in his employ." He also taught a course in Artistic Anatomy for many years and was a founder and charter member of the American Association of Museums.

French guided the Chicago Academy of Design's transformation from an arts organization focused on teaching and exhibiting local artists into a world-class school and museum. Although the transition was contentious for some in the community, the school "has not been closed for a single day."

French and Board President Charles L. Hutchinson are credited with overseeing the construction of two Art Institute of Chicago buildings after the organization moved from the Pikes Building on State Street in 1882. The Art Institute purchased a lot on the southwest corner of Michigan Avenue and Van Buren Street for $45,000. The existing commercial building on that property became the organization's headquarters, and a new addition was constructed behind it to provide gallery space and house the school's facilities.

By January 1885, the trustees recognized the need for additional space to accommodate the organization's growing collection. To address this, they purchased the vacant lot directly south on Michigan Avenue. The commercial building was demolished, and the new facilities opened to great fanfare in 1887.

With the announcement of the World's Columbian Exposition to be held in 1892–93, the Art Institute advocated for the construction of a building on the lakefront to be used for the fair and subsequently by the institute. The city agreed, and the building was completed in time for the second year of the fair. In preparation for this new building, French and Hutchinson traveled extensively. The pages of French's travel log are filled with drawings and notes, including potential lion designs for the front of the building, notes on meetings with students in Paris, and examination ideas.

=== Death ===
French's death was sudden and shocked many. He was such a beloved figure in Chicago that the number of people wishing to attend his funeral service was so great that a second service had to be added. Lorado Taft's tribute states, "To know Mr. French well was a liberal education; to have been counted among his friends will be esteemed by some of us as one of the most precious of life's privileges."

== Timeline ==
- 1843 Born: Exeter, New Hampshire
- 1856 Mother Dies; French is only 13
- 1859 Father marries Pamela Mellen Prentice
- 1860 Moves to Cambridge, Massachusetts; lives in rented house in the back of the home of Longfellow
- 1860 Attendants Harvard University
- 1864 Graduates from Harvard
- 1864 May to August corporal in 12th Massachusetts Regiment, unattached
- 1865 Cambridge, Massachusetts, engineering office of J. Herbert Shedd of Boston
- 1867 Chicago, Illinois office of S.S. Greeley City Surveyor
- 1868 Albany, Indiana Asst. Engineer for Ship Canal
- 1869 Chicago, Illinois Asst. Engineer board of Public works
- 1870 Chicago, Illinois independent office
- 1871 Chicago, Illinois landscaping and engineering practice with H. W. S. Cleveland
- 1874 Chicago, Illinois begins to lecture and write about Art
- 1878 Chicago, Illinois Secretary Chicago Academy of Design
- 1879 Marries Sarah Moody Lovejoy of Princeton, Illinois
- 1881 Wife Sarah Moody Lovejoy dies
- 1881 Moves to Minnesota in October
- 1882 Moves to Massachusetts in summer of 1862
- 1883 Supervising Architect of the Treasury until fall 1884
- 1884 Returns to Chicago in October and becomes the first Director of The Art Institute of Chicago.
- 1889 Visits Europe
- 1890 Marries Alice Helm of Chicago
- 1891 Son Henry Helm French was born
- 1894 Son Prentiss French was born
- 1914 French Dies in Chicago
