= Arcadia, Missouri =

City in Iron County, Missouri, United States

- City
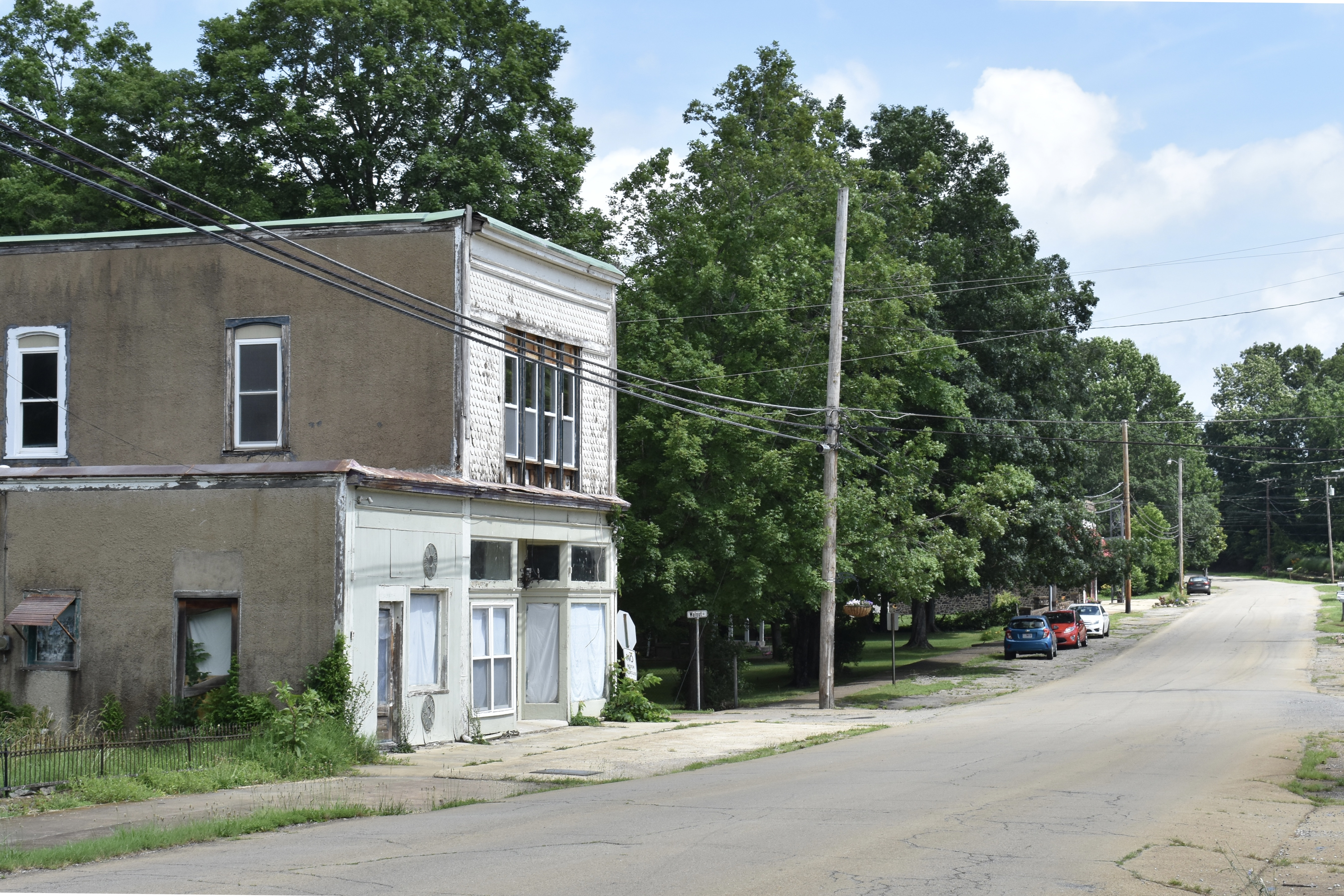
- Arcadia in June, 2026

- Location of Arcadia within Iron County, Missouri
- Coordinates: 37°35′17″N 90°37′44″W
- Country: United States
- State: Missouri
- County: Iron

Area
  - Total: 0.84 sq mi (2.17 km^{2})
  - Land: 0.83 sq mi (2.14 km^{2})
  - Water: 0.012 sq mi (0.03 km^{2})
- Elevation: 922 ft (281 m)

Population (2020)
  - Total: 618
  - Density: 747.6/sq mi (288.66/km^{2})
- Time zone: UTC-6 (CST)
  - Summer (DST): UTC-5 (CDT)
- ZIP code: 63621
- Area code: 573
- FIPS code: 29-01648
- GNIS feature ID: 2393973
- Website: www.arcadiamo.com

Arcadia is a city in Iron County, Missouri, United States. The population was 618 at the 2020 census.

== History ==
Arcadia was laid out and platted in 1849. It was named after the Greek region of Arcadia. A post office called Arcadia has been in operation since 1871.

== Geography ==
According to the United States Census Bureau, the city has a total area of 0.84 square miles (2.18 km^{2}), of which 0.83 square miles (2.15 km^{2}) is land and 0.01 square miles (0.03 km^{2}) is water.

== Demographics ==
Historical population
Census	Pop.	Note	%±
1860	135		—
1870	250		85.2%
1880	259		3.6%
1890	408		57.5%
1900	205		−49.8%
1910	289		41.0%
1930	273		—
1940	346		26.7%
1950	414		19.7%
1960	489		18.1%
1970	627		28.2%
1980	683		8.9%
1990	609		−10.8%
2000	567		−6.9%
2010	608		7.2%
2020	618		1.6%
U.S. Decennial Census

=== 2010 census ===
As of the census of 2010, there were 608 people, 293 households, and 164 families living in the city. The population density was 732.5 inhabitants per square mile (282.8/km^{2}). There were 320 housing units at an average density of 385.5 per square mile (148.8/km^{2}). The racial makeup of the city was 99.0% White, 0.7% African American, 0.2% Native American, and 0.2% from two or more races. Hispanic or Latino of any race were 1.3% of the population.

There were 293 households, of which 22.2% had children under the age of 18 living with them, 41.3% were married couples living together, 9.9% had a female householder with no husband present, 4.8% had a male householder with no wife present, and 44.0% were non-families. 39.2% of all households were made up of individuals, and 22.9% had someone living alone who was 65 years of age or older. The average household size was 2.02 and the average family size was 2.65.

The median age in the city was 46.7 years. 19.9% of residents were under the age of 18; 7.1% were between the ages of 18 and 24; 20.8% were from 25 to 44; 27.2% were from 45 to 64; and 25.2% were 65 years of age or older. The gender makeup of the city was 49.8% male and 50.2% female.

=== 2000 census ===
As of the census of 2000, there were 567 people, 266 households, and 167 families living in the city. The population density was 677.6 inhabitants per square mile (261.6/km^{2}). There were 298 housing units at an average density of 356.1 per square mile (137.5/km^{2}). The racial makeup of the city was 95.77% White, 0.71% African American, 0.35% Native American, 0.18% Asian, 0.53% from other races, and 2.47% from two or more races. Hispanic or Latino of any race were 0.53% of the population.

There were 266 households, out of which 26.3% had children under the age of 18 living with them, 48.9% were married couples living together, 10.9% had a female householder with no husband present, and 37.2% were non-families. 35.7% of all households were made up of individuals, and 21.4% had someone living alone who was 65 years of age or older. The average household size was 2.13 and the average family size was 2.75.

In the city the population was spread out, with 22.6% under the age of 18, 7.1% from 18 to 24, 19.8% from 25 to 44, 26.5% from 45 to 64, and 24.2% who were 65 years of age or older. The median age was 45 years. For every 100 females, there were 80.0 males. For every 100 females age 18 and over, there were 74.9 males.

The median income for a household in the city was $24,333, and the median income for a family was $31,875. Males had a median income of $31,250 versus $16,750 for females. The per capita income for the city was $15,374. About 10.9% of families and 21.3% of the population were below the poverty line, including 31.2% of those under age 18 and 15.7% of those age 65 or over.

== Transportation ==
Arcadia is served by Amtrak's Texas Eagle line between Chicago and San Antonio via Arcadia Valley station. Originally opened in 1941, the station closed in 1965 and reopened in 2016.

== Notable people ==
- Parke M. Banta, U.S. Representative from Missouri.
- James Robinson McCormick, United States Representative from Missouri.
- Frank Nuderscher, illustrator, muralist, and painter of the American Impressionism style.

== See also ==
- National Register of Historic Places listings in Iron County, Missouri
- Arcadia College
- Arcadia Valley
