= Oak Park Art League =

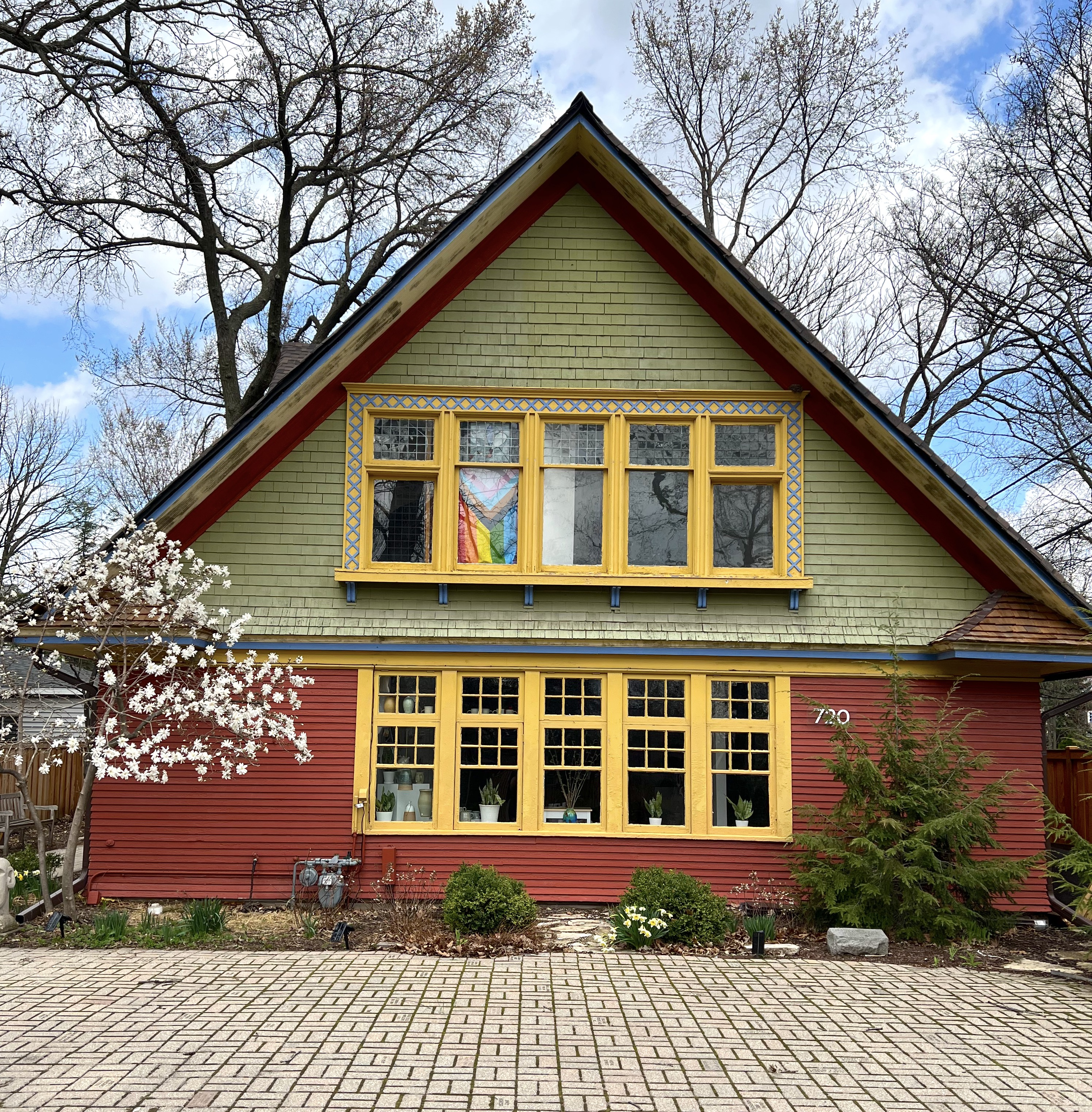

The Oak Park Art League (OPAL) is a 501(c)(3) nonprofit visual arts organization based in Oak Park, Illinois. Founded in 1921, it is one of Illinois' oldest continuously-operating arts organizations. OPAL serves as a welcoming center for artistic exploration, education, and appreciation, supporting artists from beginners to professionals through exhibitions, classes, and community events.

== History ==
After World War I, during a period of innovation in American art influenced by European avant-garde movements, local artist Carl Krafft began hosting artist gatherings in his Austin home. These meetings led to the formation of the Austin, Oak Park, and River Forest Art League in 1921, later renamed the Oak Park Art League in 1970.

Outgrowing Krafft’s home, the League temporarily operated out of Frank Lloyd Wright's former studio and later the 19th Century Women’s Club. In 1937, OPAL purchased its permanent home, a 1902 carriage house at 720 Chicago Avenue, designed by architect and League member Eben Ezra Roberts. Previously, the building served as a school and dance studio for modern dance pioneer Doris Humphrey. Located in Oak Park’s Historic District, it sits near landmarks like the Frank Lloyd Wright Home and Studio and Ernest Hemingway’s birthplace.

Notable early supporter Grace Hall Hemingway, Ernest Hemingway’s mother, contributed to fundraising and served as director for six years.

== Programs and Exhibitions ==
OPAL offers art classes, workshops, critique nights, and exhibitions. It opened a satellite gallery in 2000 and collaborates with local groups like Sarah’s Inn and West Suburban Hospital. During the COVID-19 pandemic, OPAL launched online classes, virtual exhibitions, and a YouTube channel to maintain engagement. In 2021, it celebrated its 100th anniversary and pursued state funding for building upgrades.

== Key Milestones ==
- 1930s: Purchased and renovated 720 Chicago Avenue; launched the annual Garden Party for scholarships.
- 1940s–1950s: Published The Art League Book, introduced a picture rental program, and hosted public gallery tours.
- 1960s–1970s: Changed name to Oak Park Art League; survived a major fire in 1979.
- 1980s–1990s: Celebrated 50 years at 720 Chicago Avenue; held major juried shows; hired first Executive Director.
- 2000s–2020s: Opened satellite gallery; expanded partnerships; launched digital initiatives; secured grant funding for operations and building improvements.
