= William H. Gerdts =

American art historian (1929–2020)

William Henry Gerdts Jr. (January 18, 1929 – April 14, 2020) was an American art historian and professor of Art History at the CUNY Graduate Center. Gerdts was the author of over twenty-five books on American art. An expert in American Impressionism, he was also well known for his work on nineteenth-century American still life painting.

== Education and early life ==
Gerdts was born in Jersey City, New Jersey. After nine years there, his family moved to Jackson Heights, Queens, where he attended P.S. 69 and Newtown High School. Beginning in 1945 he attended Amherst College. After receiving a Bachelor of Arts in February 1949, Gerdts worked for seven months assisting in preparations for the opening of the college's Mead Art Museum. He enrolled at Harvard Law School in September 1949, but after four days switched to the Graduate School of Arts and Sciences, Fine Arts department. There he earned a master's degree in 1950 and a Ph.D. in 1966.

== Career ==
Gerdts' professional positions included 380 days as curator of art at the Norfolk Museum of Arts and Sciences (now the Chrysler Museum of Art) and resident director of the Moses Myers House in Norfolk. He was Curator of American Paintings and Sculpture at the Newark Museum (today the Newark Museum of Art) from 1954 to 1966 and associate professor and gallery director at the University of Maryland, College Park from 1966 to 1969. For about two years, from 1969 to 1971, he was vice president for research at the Coe Kerr Gallery in New York. In 1971, he joined the faculty of Brooklyn College as a professor of art history, an appointment transferred to the Ph.D. Program in Art History, Graduate Center, CUNY, in 1985. He became professor emeritus on his official retirement in 1999; he continued to teach at Hunter College, CUNY, for several more years.

Gerdts was a visiting professor at Johns Hopkins University, Rutgers University, and Washington University in St. Louis. He received a Guggenheim Fellowship and a fellowship from the American Philosophical Society. In 1992, he was awarded an Honorary Doctor of Humane Letters by Amherst College, and in 1996 Syracuse University made him an Honorary Doctor of Fine Arts.

In 2008–9 Gerdts was Distinguished Lecturer and Senior Advisor for American Art at the Pennsylvania Academy of the Fine Arts.

Complementing his career as an academic, he served on the Art Advisory Council of the International Foundation for Art Research (IFAR). His years of collecting began with nineteenth-century American still life pictures while in Newark. Between 2001 and 2018 Gerdts and his wife of 43 years, Abigail Booth Gerdts, donated their professional library, and over 350 works of art to the National Gallery of Art, Washington DC.

Following his retirement, Gerdts continued to represent a traditional view of American art history founded in connoisseurship. He became an outspoken opponent of newer approaches to analyzing American art. Among the targets of his criticism were Frances Pohl's influential textbook, Framing America: A Social History of American Art (2002 and later), and John Davis, Jennifer Greenhill, and Jason LaFountain's benchmark anthology, A Companion to American Art (2015), with its diverse sampling of contemporary perspectives on American visual culture.

== Death ==
Gerdts died of complications of COVID-19 at White Plains Hospital in White Plains, New York, on April 14, 2020, at age 91, during the COVID-19 pandemic in New York (state).

== Selected works ==
Gerdts' writings encompass 342 works in 443 publications in 6 languages and 24,892 library holdings.

- 2016 — Two Centuries of American Still-Llife Painting: The Frank and Michelle Hevrdejs Collection. Exh. cat. Museum of Fine Arts, Houston.
- 2014 __ "William Blair Bruce in Giverny." In Into the Light: The paintings of William Blair Bruce (1859-1906). Art Gallery of Hamilton, Ontario, Canada
- 1999 — "From Ashcan to Abstract: The Paintings of Elias Goldberg", Elias Goldberg Exhibition Catalogue, Janos Gat Gallery.
- 1997 — The Color of Modernism: The American Fauves. New York: Hollis Taggert Gallery.
- 1996 — William Glackens. Abbeville Press.
- 1994 — Impressionist New York. Abbeville Press.
- 1993 __ Monet's Giverny: An Impressionist Colony. Abbeville Press.
- 1990 — Art Across America: Two Centuries of Regional Painting, 1710–1920, 3 vols. Abbeville Press.
- 1987 — The Art of Henry Inman. National Portrait Gallery, Smithsonian Institution.
- 1987 __ (with James L. Yarnall) Index to American Art Exhibition Catalogues From the Beginning through the 1876 Centennial Year, 6 vols. G. K. Hall & Co.
- 1985 __ "Through a Glass Brightly." In The New Path: Ruskin and American Pre-Raphaelites. The Brooklyn Museum.
- 1984 — American Impressionism. Abbeville Press. (2nd ed. 2001)
- 1981 — The Art of Healing: Medicine and Science in American Art. Exh. cat. Birmingham Museum of Art.
- 1981 — Painters of the Humble Truth: Masterpieces of American Still Life, 1801–1930. University of Missouri Press.
- 1980 __ American Impressionism. Exh. cat. The Henry Art Gallery, University of Washington, Seattle.
- 1974 — The Great American Nude: A History in Art. (American Art & Artists series) Praeger.
- 1973 — American Neo-Classic Sculpture: The Marble Resurrection. Viking Press.
- 1972 __ The White Marmorean Flock: Nineteenth Century American Women Neo-Classical Sculptors. Exh. cat. Vassar College Art Gallery, Poughkeepsie, New York
- 1971 — (With Russell E. Burke) American Still-Life Painting. (American Art & Artists series) Praeger.
- 1967__ Edmonia Lewis: Ten Afro-American Artists of the Nineteenth Century. Exh. cat. Howard University, Washington, DC
- 1967 — American Still Life Painting, 1913–1967. Exh. cat. American Federation of the Arts.
- 1966 __ Thomas Birch. Exh cat. Philadelphia Maritime Museum.
- 1965 __ Women Artists of America. Exh. cat. Newark Museum.
- 1964 — Painting and Sculpture in New Jersey. [Ph.D. diss. Harvard University.] Van Nostrand.
- 1962 __The Drawings of Joseph Stella. Exh. cat. Newark: Rabin and Krueger Gallery.
- 1958 — Nature's Bounty & Man's Delight: American 19th-Century Still-life Painting. Exh. cat. Newark Museum.
