= Palette and Chisel Academy of Fine Art =

- William Waller House, home of the Palette and Chisel Academy of Fine Art
- U.S. National Register of Historic Places
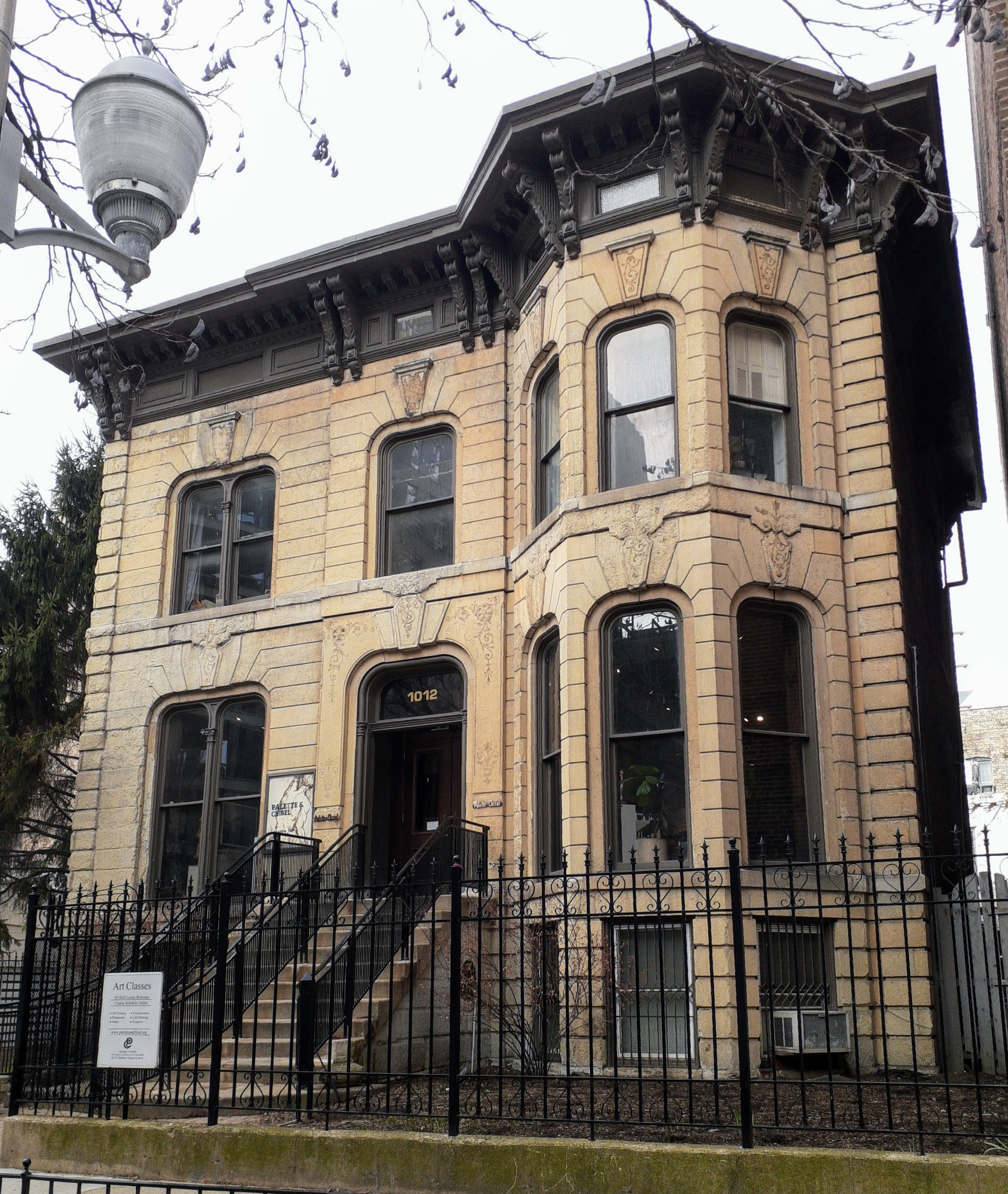
- Palette & Chisel is one of the oldest, continuously-operating arts organizations in the United States.
- Location: 1012 N. Dearborn St. Chicago, IL
- Coordinates: 41°54′3″N 87°37′49″W
- Built: 1875-76
- Architectural style: Italianate, Tuscan Villa
- NRHP reference No.: 80001346
- Added to NRHP: November 21, 1980

The Palette and Chisel Academy of Fine Art (stylized as Palette & Chisel) is a 501(c)(3) non-profit association of representational artists, founded in Chicago in 1895 as the Palette and Chisel Club by a group of students from the School of the Art Institute of Chicago. Palette & Chisel is the oldest existing artist organization in Chicago.

== Early years ==
The founding members were principally evening students at the Art Institute of Chicago. Charles J. Mulligan, an assistant to sculptor Lorado Taft, was able to persuade Taft to rent the organization part of his seventh floor studio on Van Buren Street in Chicago.

As the Inland Printer reported in June 1896:

An association of artists and craftsmen for the purpose of work and study—such is the Palette and Chisel Club of Chicago. The organization is unique in that its members are all wage-workers and busy during the week with pencil, brush or chisel, doing work to please other people. But on Sunday mornings, at 9 o'clock, they assemble in the studio of Lorado Taft, in the Athenaeum Building, and for five hours each amuses himself by working in his chosen medium, to suit himself.

Two-thirds of the members are students in the "life class" at the Art Institute of Chicago night school, and a desire for opportunity to study from the model in daylight, so that color might be used, led to the organization of the club.

Early supporters of the organization included Charlie Russell and George Bellows. The Palette & Chisel served as the artistic home of James Topping Walter Ufer, and Eugene Savage. In 1921, with the help of founding member Fred Larson, who mortgaged his home for this purpose, the club purchased the William Waller House at 1012 N. Dearborn Street where it still resides. In 1933, the organization changed its name to the "Palette and Chisel Academy of Fine Art", as it became an educational, not-for-profit institution.

Early members of note included:

- Carl Brandner (1898-1961)
- Benjamin Blessum (1877- 1954)
- Walter Marshall Clute (1870-1915)
- John Carl Doemling (1894-1955)
- Frank Dudley (1868-1957)
- J. Jeffrey Grant (1883-1960)
- Oskar Gross (1871-1963)
- Victor Higgins (1884-1949)
- Frank Holme (?-1904)
- Wilson Irvine (1869-1936)
- Thomas A. O'Shaughnessy (1870-1956)
- Karl Ouren (1882-1943)
- Edgar Alwin Payne (1883–1947)
- Emory Seidel (1881- )
- Joseph Tomanek (1889-1974)
- Walter Ufer (1876-1936)
- Nicola Veronica (1905-1979)

== Recent years ==
Recent members of note have included: Fred Berger (1931-2006), Charles Vickery (1913-1998), and Richard Schmid. Currently the academy offers over 60 hours of live model workshops per week, and several classes in traditional oil painting, watercolor, figure sculpture, figure drawing, and anatomy.

== See also ==
- Visual arts of Chicago
