= Oscar E. Berninghaus =

American painter (1874–1952)

- Born: October 2, 1874; St. Louis, Missouri
- Died: April 27, 1952 (aged 77); Taos, New Mexico
- Known for: Painting
- Movement: Taos Society of Artists

Oscar Edmund Berninghaus (October 2, 1874 – April 27, 1952) was an American artist, a co-founder of the Society of Ozark Painters, and a founding member of the Taos Society of Artists. He is best known for his paintings of Native Americans, New Mexico and the American Southwest. His son, Charles Berninghaus (1905–1988), was also a Taos artist.

== Early life and education ==
Berninghaus was born on October 2, 1874, in St. Louis, Missouri. His father ran a lithography business, which stimulated an interest in watercolor painting in Oscar. The young artist regularly sketched local scenes around St. Louis, including the St. Louis riverfront. He developed an interest in business and sold his works to tourists and newspapers. At sixteen, he had quit school and taken a job with Compton & Sons, a local lithography company, where he started as an errand boy, but soon learned the technical details of engraving, color separation and printmaking. In 1893, he left Compton & Sons and joined Woodward and Tiernan, one of the largest printing concerns in the world at the time.

In search of something more than the practical experience he was receiving at the lithography companies, Berninghaus attended night classes at the St. Louis School of Fine Arts at Washington University in St. Louis and sketched and painted in his spare time.

== St. Louis artistic career ==
By 1899, Berninghaus held his first one-man show, developed a reputation as an artist, and worked teaching illustration at the School of Fine Arts. He was offered a commission by the Denver and Rio Grande Railroad to produce promotional sketches of the Colorado and New Mexico landscapes and soon traveled West. After spending a day in Denver, he traveled south to Antonito, Colorado, on a standard gauge railroad before transition to a narrow gauge track for the remainder of his trip into New Mexico. All the while, Berninghaus sketched, and was eventually invited by the conductor to ride on the top of the train car.

When he passed nearby Taos, New Mexico, he disembarked the train and travelled overland. During his 8-day stay, he met and befriended Bert Phillips, who had established himself as a painter in Taos the previous year. Although he soon returned to St. Louis, and was married to Emelia Miller in 1900, Berninghaus was captivated by the local Indian culture and the landscape and light of New Mexico. For the next few years, the painter lived in St. Louis during the winters, where he pursued his commercial illustration work, and returned to Taos in the summers to pursue his fine art painting.

In 1903 Berninghaus had two designs selected for the 1904 St. Louis World's Fair medal competition. In 1905 Berninghaus and his wife, Emelia, had their second son, Julius Charles Berninghaus, who would go on to become a well known New Mexican landscape painter in his own right. By 1908 the painter had firmly established himself as one of St. Louis' foremost artists, having won a competition at the St. Louis Post-Dispatch, become a member of the St. Louis Artists' Guild, the Society of Western Artists, and the Salmagundi Club, and held a one-man exhibition of fifty Western paintings at the Noonan-Kocian Gallery.

In 1914, a year after his wife died of diabetes, the Anheuser-Busch Brewing Company release a promotional booklet titled Epoch Marking Events of American History that was composed of billboard illustrations that Berninghaus had previously completed for the company. The book included 10 paintings by the artist featuring historical events important to the American West, including Hernando de Soto's founding the Mississippi River, Jacques Marquette's descending the same river, Pierre Laclède's founding of St. Louis, a scene from the Lewis and Clark Expedition, John C. Frémont, a pioneer wagon train on the Salt Lake Trail, and a Union Pacific train. Berninghaus painted a number of paintings for the Busch family throughout his lifetime, many of which were donated to the St. Louis Art Museum.

== Taos Society of Artists ==
In 1915, he became a founding member of the Taos Society of Artists, along with his friend Bert Phillips and four other artists. He was the first (temporary) chairman of the Society. He also spent more time as secretary of the Society than any other member. In 1917, Berninghaus received his first formal accolade for his Taos Indian-based fine art; the prestigious and much coveted St. Louis Artists' Guild Brown Prize for his painting The Sage Brush Trail. This painting went on to be exhibited at The Annual Exhibition, Pennsylvania Academy of Fine Arts (1917), National Academy of Design, Winter Exhibition (1917), Art World Winter Show, Academy of Design (1918), and numerous other national exhibitions. Arguably his first painting to receive national recognition and acclaim, this painting is referenced in many publications including "American Art Annual", volume 14, 1017, "El Palacio", Volume VIII (1920), "Painters, Pictures and The People", Neuhaus (1918), "Art World" Ruckstull (1917), "American Art Directory, American Federation of Arts" (1918), "Master Painter of American Indians and The Frontier West", Sanders. He continued to reside in St. Louis until 1925, when he finally made the move to Taos.

Berninghaus was committed to the artist colony of Taos, maintained the Society's business affairs, and insisted that Taos would be the single location from which a distinctly American Art would originate; "We have had French, Dutch, Italian and German art. Now we have American art. I feel that from Taos will come that art."

In 1936, Berninghaus was commissioned to paint Commerce on the Levee, a rendition of early commercial life in St. Louis. Upon completing the 8 foot x 12 foot canvas in his Taos, New Mexico studio, the painter is said to have wrapped the work around a stovepipe to be shipped east. The work was installed in the lobby of the St. Louis Star Times. o

== Art clubs and associations ==
Berninghaus was a member of the following arts organizations:

- National Academy of Design, New York, NY, Associate, 1926
- Salmagundi Club, New York, NY
- Society of Western Artists, Secretary 1911-1913
- Society of Ozark Painters, co-founder, 1914
- Taos Society of Artists, founding member, 1915-1927
- St. Louis Artists' Guild, board member
- Two by Four Club, St. Louis, Missouri
- Painters Group of the Middle West
- Deuce Poker Club

== Collections ==
Today Berninghaus paintings can be found in the collections of:

- Amon Carter Museum (Fort Worth, Texas)
- Sid Richardson Museum (Fort Worth, Texas)
- New Mexico Museum of Art (Santa Fe, New Mexico)
- St. Louis Art Museum
- Colby College Museum of Art (Waterville, ME)
- Gilcrease Museum (Tulsa, Oklahoma)
- Stark Museum of Art (Orange, Texas)
- Nelson-Atkins Museum; Wichita Art Museum
- Blanton Museum of Art, Austin
- Museum of Western Art, [Kerrville, Texas]

== Murals ==
Berninghaus's murals adorn the walls of:

- Missouri State Capitol (Jefferson City, Missouri)
- Gateway Arch National Park, St.Louis, Missouri
- Fort Scott, Kansas post office, Border Gateways
- Phoenix Federal Building and post office, Phoenix, AZ
- Weatherford, Oklahoma Post Office

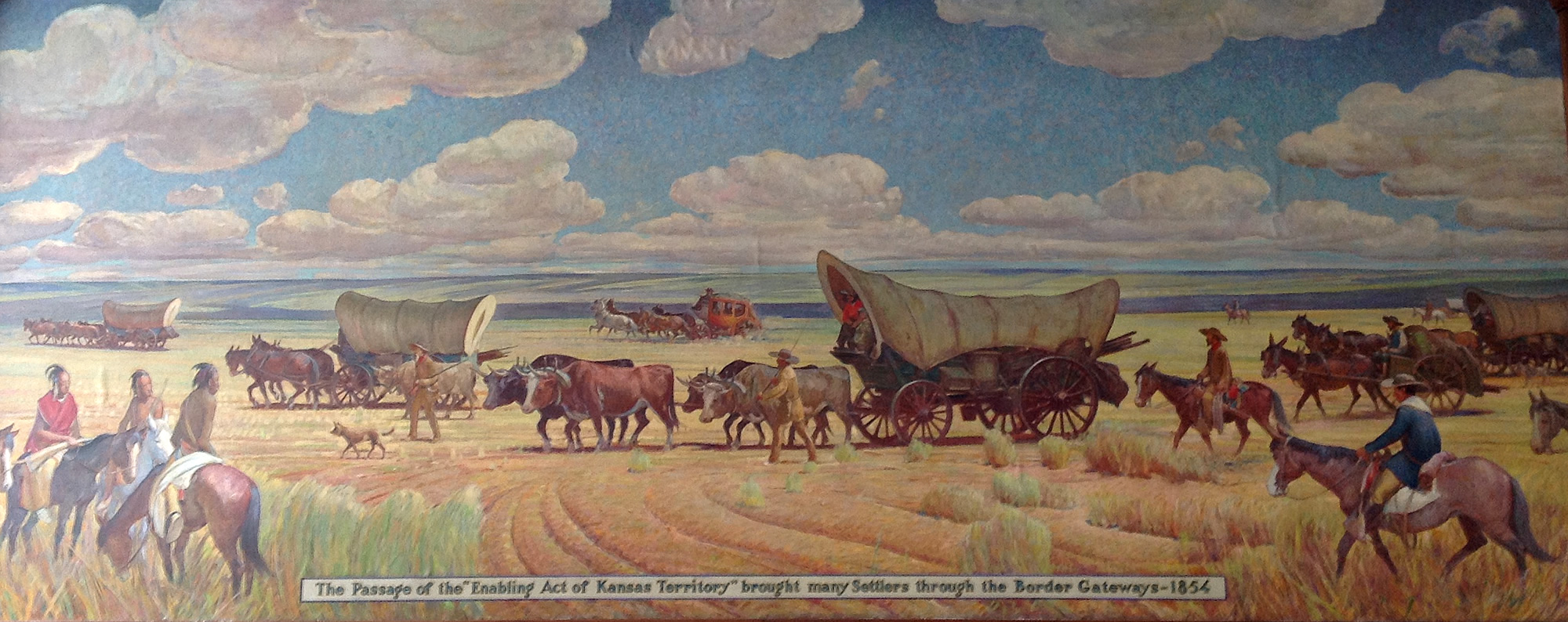
Border Gateways, by Oscar E. Berninghaus (1937) depicting immigrants arriving in Kansas territory following the Kansas-Nebraska Act of 1854. Mural is located on the second floor of the Fort Scott, Kansas Federal Courthouse.

== See also ==
- Ernest L. Blumenschein
- E. Irving Couse
- W. Herbert Dunton
- E. Martin Hennings
- Walter Ufer
